= ReTrans Midt =

Norwegian waste collection company

ReTrans Midt AS
- Type: Joint venture
- Industry: Waste collection
- Founded: 10 January 2018; 8 years ago
- Headquarters: Levanger, Norway
- Area served: Trøndelag, Nordmøre
- Revenue: 124 million kr (2023)
- Number of employees: 75 (2026)
- Parent: Innherred Renovasjon; Midtre Namdal Avfallsselskap; ReMidt
- Website: retrans.no

ReTrans Midt AS, trading as ReTrans, is a waste collection company operating in Trøndelag and Nordmøre in Norway. It is owned by the inter-municipal waste management agencies Innherred Renovasjon (IR), Midtre Namdal Avfallsselskap (MNA) and ReMidt. ReTrans was established in 2018 and is based in Levanger Municipality.

== Operations ==
ReTrans operates the waste collection trucks for three inter-municipal waste management agencies: Innherred Renovasjon, Midtre Namdal Avfallsselskap and ReMidt. Between them, these cover the entirety of Trøndelag (except Trondheim, Steinkjer and Fosen) and Nordmøre. ReTrans operates about 50 waste collection trucks, has about 75 employees and had a revenue of 124 million Norwegian kroner in 2023. The company is owned a third each by the three partners. ReTrans has its head office in Levanger.

== History ==
ReTrans Midt was established in January 2018 as a joint venture between three inter-municipal waste management companies in Trøndelag: Innherred Renovasjon, Midtre Namdal Avfallsselskap and HAMOS Forvaltning, with equal parts each. The three companies merged their existing waste collection operations into ReTrans, as well as expanding its operations to cover gaps caused by terminated contracts. By merging their operations into a single company, the agencies aimed at achieving economies of scale. An example of this was a common workshop in Levanger.

Areas served by the waste collection company ReTrans Midt Midtre Namdal Avfallsselskap Innherred Renovasjon ReMidt—former Envina ReMidt—former HAMOS Forvaltning ReMidt—former Nordmøre Interkommunale Renovasjonsselskap (NIR) ReMidt—former NIR not served by ReTrans

IR had subcontracted about a third of its waste collection, for 12,000 households in Inderøy, Leksvik, Malvik, Meråker, Selbu and parts of Stjørdal, to Retur from 1 October 2016. IR was not satisfied with the service quality, and after negotiations on 10 January 2018, Retur terminated the contract with IR. From before, IR operated their own waste collection in Levanger, Verdal, Frosta and parts of Stjørdal. Retur stated that the diverting opinions was mostly related to health, environment and safety. Retur filed for bankruptcy on 1 March 2019. IR stated that a contributing cause of the low service quality was a very high turnover amongst staff, often hiring people without suitable local knowledge and who neither spoke Norwegian nor English. IR chose to not take over staff and vehicles from Retur, stating that they wanted to provide long-term employment to locals, with better wage and pension rights. They stated that Retur's vehicles were not suitable. ReTrans became operative on 5 February, with the former Retur routes with IR. IR subsequently merged its own collection operations, accounting for about two thirds of its operations, into ReTrans.

MNA had traditionally operated all the waste collection through tenders. For the municipalities of Leka, Vikna , Nærøy and Bindal, these had been contracted to Miljøservice Ottersøy. For the rest of municipalities, it had been contracted to Retur. Miljøservice Ottersøy filed for bankruptcy in mid-2017, and was taken over by MNA itself on 1 August 2017. Also MNA terminated its contract with Retur in January 2018. ReTrans took over all operations for MNA from 1 May 2018.

The third founder was HAMOS Forvaltning, which operated the waste management in eleven municipalities in Uttrøndelag. HAMOS had tendered off its collections to its own subsidiary, Retura Sør-Trøndelag. The contract ended on 1 May, and HAMOS decided to also join ReTrans as an owner and let them be the collecting company.

HAMOS merged with Envina and Nordmøre Interkommunale Renovasjonsselskap on 1 January 2020 to create ReMidt. Within ReMidt's area (Nordmøre and Uttrøndelag), ReTrans does ReMidt's self-operated waste collection in all municipalities except Smøla and Oppdal, where it is done by private companies on a tender.
