= ReMidt =

Norwegian waste collection agency

ReMidt IKS
- Type: Inter-municipal company
- Industry: Waste management
- Predecessors: Envina; HAMOS Forvaltning; Nordmøre Interkommunale Renovasjonsselskap
- Founded: 1 January 2020; 6 years ago
- Headquarters: Orkanger, Norway
- Area served: Nordmøre, Uttrøndelag
- Subsidiaries: ReTrans Midt (33%)
- Website: http://www.remidt.no

ReMidt is an inter-municipal waste management agency for parts of Uttrøndelag and Nordmøre, Norway. The company is headquartered in Orkanger, with additional offices in Melhus and Kristiansund. The company covers 130.000 residents and had a revenue of 250 million kroner in 2020.

It was created on 1 January 2020 as a merger of Envina, HAMOS Forvaltning and Nordmøre Interkommunale Renovasjonsselskap. It is the inter-municipal waste management agency in Norway with the most owners. An intention agreement was made in September 2018 amongst the owner municipalities of the three agencies. It took one year for all the 21 municipalities to made the necessary decisions, as a merger required unanimity.

On the same day as ReMidt was created, a municipal merger reform took place, reducing the number of owner municipalities to 17. The owners are:

- Møre og Romsdal: Aure, Averøy, Kristiansund, Smøla, Sunndal, Surnadal, Tingvoll
- Trøndelag: Frøya, Heim, Hitra, Melhus, Midtre Gauldal, Oppdal, Orkland, Rennebu, Rindal, Skaun

ReMidt consists of two sister companies. ReMidt IKS is an interkommunalt selskap with the municipalities as participating owners. It is responsible for household waste, including collection and recycling centers, as well as sludge. ReMidt Næring AS is responsible for commercial waste collection from the business sector. It is owned 20 percent by ReMidt IKS and the rest by the various municipalities. It is part of the Retura franchise.

The operation of waste collection in all but two municipalities is carried out by ReTrans Midt, a joint venture owned along with two other inter-municipal waste management companies in Trøndelag—Innherred Renovasjon and Midtre Namdal Avfallsselskap. In Smøla and Oppdal, waste collection is done by private companies on a tender. Wet organic waste is driven to Ecopro in Skjørdalen in Verdal, where it is converted to biofuel. ReMidt owns 10 percent of the facility.
