= Innherred Renovasjon =

Norwegian waste collection agency

Innherred Renovasjon IKS
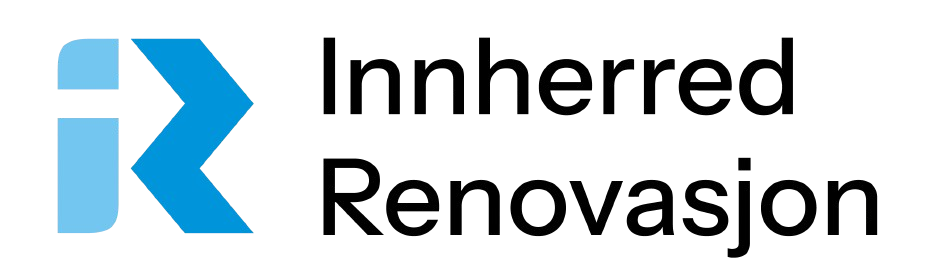
- Type: Inter-municipal company
- Industry: Waste management
- Founded: 14 January 1985; 41 years ago
- Headquarters: Verdalsøra, Norway
- Area served: Inntrøndelag
- Number of employees: 118 (2026)
- Subsidiaries: ReTrans Midt (33%); Ecopro (28%)
- Website: innherredrenovasjon.no

Innherred Renovasjon IKS (IR) is an intermunicipal waste management agency for the southern parts southern portion of Innherred as well as Stjørdalen in Trøndelag, Norway.

IR was founded in 1985 as a cooperation between the municipalities of Frosta, Inderøy, Levanger and Verdal. It has since been joined by Leksvik and Meråker in 1997, Stjørdal in 1998, Malvik and Selbu in 2000 and Tydal in 2015.

Headquartered at Verdalsøra, the main recycling center is located at Mule in Levanger. Skjørdalen in Verdal is the site of Ecopro, a biofuel facility which accepts IRs wet organic waste and sludge. Waste collection is carried out by the joint venture ReTrans Midt. IR has a commercial subsidiary, part of the Retura chain.

== History ==
=== Establishment ===
The four municipalities of Frosta, Inderøy, Levanger and Verdal started cooperating around waste management in 1974, when they established a common waste committee, and inaugurated a common landfill at Ekle near Stiklestad in Verdal. The Pollution Act of 1983 introduced a general ban on littering, required municipalities to collect all household waste, finance this through self-cost fees placed on the public, and placed landfills under the supervision of the Pollution Control Authority.

The amount of waste increased dramatically in the early 1980s, and became clear that the landfill at Ekle would be filled up by 1985. Ideally the municipalities wanted to build an incinerator, but realized that that would not be possible to do before the landfill filled up. Several locations were considered: Flaget and Rostad in Inderøy; Bjørndalen and Jøssåsdalen in Verdal; Munkeby and the quarry pit at Mule in Levanger. It ended with Mule being selected as the site for the landfill, while Ørin in Verdal was selected for the site for sludge treatment. The landfill at Mule was 3.8 hectares (9.4 acres) and had a permit to accept up to 9,600 tonnes of waste per year, which would mean it would take thirteen years to fill it up. There were local protests, in particularly due to it being only 200 meters (660 ft) from the closest housing.

Innherred Renovasjons' corporate logo for the first thirty years

To finance and operate the landfill, an intermunicipal legal body was needed. Innherred Renovasjon ANS was formally incorporated on 14 January 1985. A loan of 4.2 million was taken out to finance the investments. To begin with, IR had no employees, but instead paid Levanger Municipality for their employees to operate the company. The company became operational on 1 June 1985, when waste could be accepted at Mule. Mosvik joined IR in 1988.

IR was one of two inter-municipal waste management agencies in Nord-Trøndelag, the other being Midtre Namdal Avfallsselskap (MNA). Other municipalities, including the major Innherred municipality of Steinkjer, chose to operate by themselves, at least for the time being.

=== Early operations ===
The Pollution Act required the municipalities to gather sludge from everyone with such a facility. Many people were opposed to this, as they had previously just let the sludge run into nature, and were opposed to the costs associated with pickup and proper treatment. As late as 1990, some people denied IR to gather their sludge. A sludge treatment plant was built at Ørin in Verdal, co-located with Verdal Municipality's waste water treatment plant. The facility cost 3.9 million kroner. From 1987 there was a major debate about if the operations of the sludge trucks should be done by IR or by private operators on tender. It ended with IR doing half the trucks themselves, and the other half on tender.

Farmer Audun Ekren in Verdal started a service in 1985, where he would pick up wet organic waste from commercial kitchens and use it to feed his pigs. In 1987 he convinced IR that this should be mandated in their catchment area. They introduced a fee to cover the transport costs. IR was also glad to not have to accept the 250 tonnes per year to the landfill.

From 1989, IR introduced the first steps of waste sorting. Six containers were placed out, allowing people to deliver glas and metal. Dead animals were delivered to companies who extracted the proteins and fat. Freon was extracted from fridges, which then had their metal recycled. There were also experiments with composting household wet organic waste.

New laws required municipalities to have systems to collect hazardous waste. Households were issued a cardboard box which they could fill. A hazardous waste station was established at Mule, where both households and companies could deliver such waste. Along with MNA, IR launched two campaigns, Svett'n for hazardous waste and Batte for batteries. The campaigns were later exported to other parts of the country, and a number of small stations were built around the area. Systems were also established to handle medical waste.

In 1990 the County Governor took up the need for either a regional landfill, or that the entire county truck its waste to Heimdal Incinerator in Trondheim. At the time there was still 4,600 households in Verdal, Levanger and Inderøy would did not have mandated waste collection. This meant that these households were either burning their own waste, or simply throwing it into nature at unofficial landfills.

Inderøy took upon itself to be the trial municipality for waste sorting. After some experiments in 1993, it introduced as the first municipality in Norway a three-container system for all residents: a green container for general waste, a blue container for paper and cardboard, and a brown container for wet organic waste. After a year, nearly 70 percent of waste was sorted. Frosta and Mosik joined later that year.

The main issue was space for the composting. A small area at Mule was initially chosen for this, but had insufficient capacity to also compost for Verdal and Levanger. A facility for composting was completed in 1995 at Skjørdalen in Verdal, just off National Road 72. Initially the facility had a composting field measuring 90 by 45 meters (295 by 148 ft). The turn-around time at Skjørdalen was about six months, and it could then be sold as compost or soil. By 2000 the facility was also accepting wet organic waste from Steinkjer and MNA.

IR decided that they would build a recycling center in each municipality, allowing residents to deliver sorted waste. These opened at Røra in Inderøy in 1993; Tinden in Verdal and Haugagruva in Mosvik in 1995; Mule, the village of Leksvik and Skaret in Frosta in 1996; Midtbygda in Meråker in 1997; Sutterø in Stjørdal in 1998; Skjenstad in Malvik and Kvallomyra in Selbu in 2001.

Mule Landfill closed in 1996, at which time 130 thousand tonnes of waste had been deposited there. After being sealed off, a flaring unit was installed to burn off the methane that built up. From 2002 this was turned into a biogas burner, which provided heating for IRs buildings at the recycling center at Mule. A new landfill opened as Skjørdalen to replace Mule in 1996.

Recycled paper and cardboard was from 1991 gathered and stored at at Nossum in Levanger. In October 1996 this was moved to Mule. Drinking cartons were sold to Norsk Returkartong, while the rest was sold to Sweden via Norsk Gjenvinning.

A trial system with including plastic in the paper bin was carried out in Mosvik in 1998, and gradually introduced in all municipalities. From 2004 the system changed to plastic was instead placed in a plastic bag and left next the bin on pick-up day. IR started accepting electronic waste as a separate category in 1999. This was originally sorted at Mule, then later moved to Weee Recycling at Øysand, where IR was a partial owner.

=== Expansion south ===
Leksvik and Meråker joined IR in 1997, followed by Stjørdal the following year. Malvik and Selbu followed suit in 2000. IR changed its organizational form to an interkommunalt selskap in 1999.

From 2004, the part of waste management aimed at the business and institutional sector became subject ot market forces. IR and other municipal agencies retained their monopoly on household waste. To operate in both the regulated and commercial market, IR spun off 40 of 50 people into Retura IR AS, a franchise of the national Retura chain of waste collectors.

The next step was to establish a biofuel facility at Skjørdalen. Cooperation agreements were made with 41 municipalities in Trøndelag and Helgeland, leading to the establishment of Ecopro. The manufacturing plant opened in 2008, and was expanded again in 2017 and 2022.

Innherred Renovasjon adopted a new logo and visual profiling in 2014

Innherred Renovasjon adopted a new visual profile and logo in 2014, after they had used their original logo since the onset. IR took over waste management in Tydal Municipality in June 2015, and Tydal joined IR as an owner from 2017. Residents in Tydal had not had waste sorting at home before, so this saw the introduction of three containers for them. Following the municipal mergers of Inderøy and Mosvik in 2012, a new recycling station was opened at Utøy in Inderøy in 2018.

From 1 October 2016, IR had subcontracted about a third of its waste collection, for 12,000 households in Inderøy, Leksvik, Malvik, Meråker, Selbu and parts of Stjørdal, to Retur. It rained operations operations itself in Levanger, Verdal, Frosta and the remainder of Stjørdal. IR was not satisfied with the service quality, and after negotiations on 10 January 2018, Retur terminated the contract with IR. Retur stated that the diverting opinions was mostly related to health, environment and safety. Retur filed for bankruptcy on 1 March 2019.

IR stated that a contributing cause of the low service quality was a very high turnover amongst staff, often hiring people without suitable local knowledge and who neither spoke Norwegian nor English. IR chose to not take over staff and vehicles from Retur, stating that they wanted to provide long-term employment to locals, with better wage and pension rights. They stated that Retur's vehicles were not suitable. As two other Trøndelag waste managers were in the same predicament, IR teamed up with MNA and HAMOS Forvaltning to establish ReTrans Midt to operate the waste trucks. ReTrans became operative on 5 February, with the former Retur routes with IR. IR subsequently merged its own collection operations, accounting for about two thirds of its operations, into ReTrans.

A fourth container was introduced for all households from 2019, for glass and metal packaging. This removed the need for a network of stations for the public to dispose of these materials. Leksvik merged with Rissa Municipality to form Indre Fosen on 1 January 2018. Fosen Renovasjon took over the responsibility for waste management for all of Indre Fosen on 1 January 2020. Meråker also got a new recycling station, in 2021.

== Bibliography ==
- Stavrum, Pål (2005). 20 års renovasjonsrevolusjon (PDF) (in Norwegian). Verdal: Innherred Renovasjon. Archived from the original (PDF) on 25 May 2015.
