= Trondheim Airport, Øysand =

- IATA: none; ICAO: none

Summary
- Airport type: Military
- Operator: Luftwaffe
- Serves: Trondheim, Norway
- Location: Øysand, Melhus Municipality
- Coordinates: 63.3323°N 010.2274°E

Map
- Location in Norway

Runways
Direction	Length		Surface
Direction	m	ft	Surface
	~~1,800~~	~~5,910~~	~~Wood~~

Trondheim Airport, Øysand (Norwegian: Trondheim flyplass, Øysand) was a military air base situated at Øysand in Melhus Municipality, Norway. Established by Luftwaffe in 1940, remained in use throughout the Second World War, until 1945. The airfield consisted of a runway made of wooden frames filled with sand 1,800 by 60 meters (5,910 by 200 ft). The airport was little used and only a squadron of meteorological observation aircraft where stationed there. Its main role thus remained as a backup of the larger air stations of Ørland and Værnes. Øysand was proposed as the site to build the German exclave Nordstern, but the plans never materialized.

== History ==
Planning of Øysand commenced on 6 May 1940, just a month after the German invasion of Norway. Surveying was carried out by geologist K. Richter on behalf of Luftwaffe. He considered both Øysand and Høstad in Byneset Municipality and found the former to be most suitable. Richter proposed three different runway configurations, varying between 1,800 and 1,200 meters (5,900 and 3,900 ft) in length. There was no German contractors available in Trøndelag at the time and therefore Luftwaffe organized construction with Norwegian workers, bused from Trondheim every day. The local school, chapel and youth center were requisitioned for storage space.

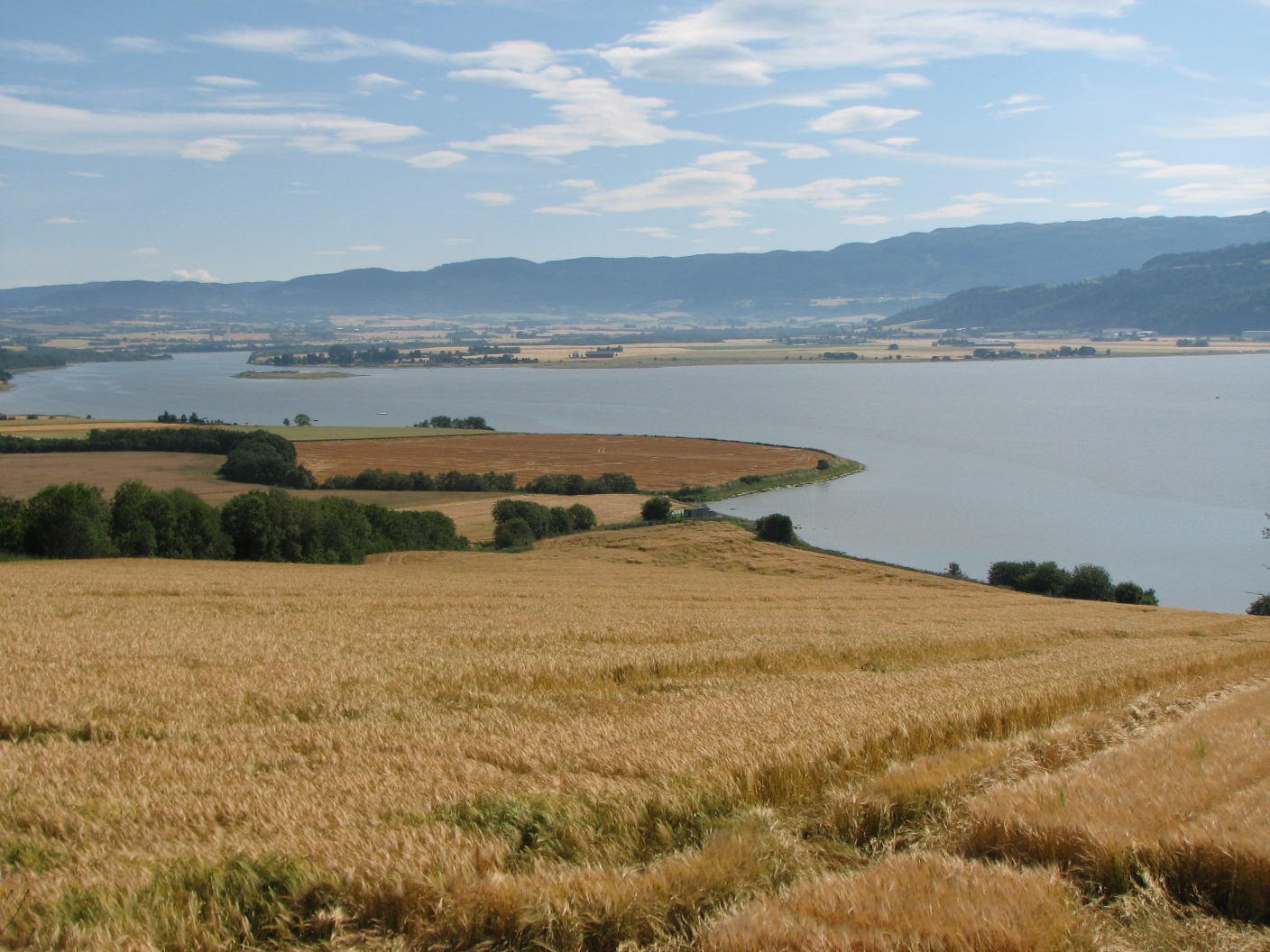
The Gaulosen delta with Øysand in the background, looking from Byneset Municipality

The work was sufficient by August 1940 that the airport could be used. It was a "field airport", so that it was not intended to have a garrison, receiving a 1,800-by-60-meter (5,910 by 200 ft) runway. German soldiers initially stayed at surrounding farms, until the 1941 opening of the barracks. A radio station was first established at Øyås, later moved to Finnset. Only in the summer of 1944 was the airfield upgraded to a firm, wooden structure, This was because of difficulties in procuring sufficient wood for the runway.

Øysand's role was mostly to act as a reserve airport for Ørland and Værnes. It had a major ammunition storage and was commonly used to restock Junkers Ju 88s. Ju 52 transporters were another common sight. Ten dummy aircraft of Messerschmitt Bf 109 fighters were placed to fool intelligence. The German Army used the airfield on occasion for training. This included a 1942 training with flame fougasses.

The airport was selected as the ground aerodrome to serve any German aircraft carriers when these were in the Trondheimsfjord. However, the termination of the carrier program caused these plans to be shelved. A fixed wooden surface was installed on the runway in mid-1944, allowing Øysand to play a role in the North Atlantic weather war. From November 1944, Wetterstaffel 3 was stationed at Øysand, using Ju 88 and Ju 188 aircraft for meteorological observations in the North Atlantic.

The Kriegsmarine established a major presence in Norway, but was cut off without a major naval port and dry dock. Øysand was proposed as a suitable site for such naval base, which would have been built up as a major air force and naval site. Estimates for the plans, which were named Nordstern, were for a population of 250,000 of exclusively Germans. However, all that was ever realized at Øysand was the airfield and a small army base, as well as a series of prison camps.

== Facilities ==
The airport was situated at Øysand in Melhus, a flat agricultural peninsula in Gaulosen, the delta of the river Gaula. The airport originally featured a wooden runway measuring 1,800-by-60-meter (5,910 by 200 ft). This was later upgraded and given wooden surface measuring 1,175 by 100 meters (3,855 by 328 ft). Taxiways were built in a fan-shape out from the runway, leading to aircraft shelters. These received earthwork walls to protect them for enemy fire. A radio station at Finnset received two antennas and was staffed with between two and five people at any time.

The air defense consisted of a 20 mm gun situated just south of Reitbakken, as well as machine gun positions in Øyberget. The airfield was also covered by the artillery position between Nypan and Kvammen, which had an 88 mm gun, a 10.5 cm gun and a 12.8 cm gun. However, these were not primarily aimed at air defense but rather as part of the coastal artillery. However, they had excellent coverage of the air space of Øysand.

== Accidents and incidents ==
- On 12 December 1944 a Heinkel bomber crashed after attempting to land at Øysand. Damaged, it attempted the landing at too low an altitude. It pulled up, but after a left banking the pilots lost control and the aircraft crashed in Leinstrand Municipality, killing one on board.
- On 8 May 1945, the day the war ended, two intoxicated airmen took off with a Ju 52 aircraft. It crashed shortly after take-off into a residence in Buvika. Both airmen survived.

== Bibliography ==
- Brovold, Gabriel (1996). Neu-Drontheim i Hitlers regi – og Øysand under krigen. Melhus: Snøfugl Forlag. ISBN 8270832030.
- Hafsten, Bjørn; Larsstuvold, Ulf; Olsen, Bjørn; Stenersen, Sten (1991). Flyalarm: Luftkrigen over Norge 1939–1945 (in Norwegian). Oslo: Sem & Stenersen. ISBN 82-7046-058-3.
- Spotts, Frederic (2002). Hitler and the Power of Aesthetics. Hutchinson. ISBN 1-58567-345-5.
