= Ecopro =

Norwegian biogas factory

Ecopro AS
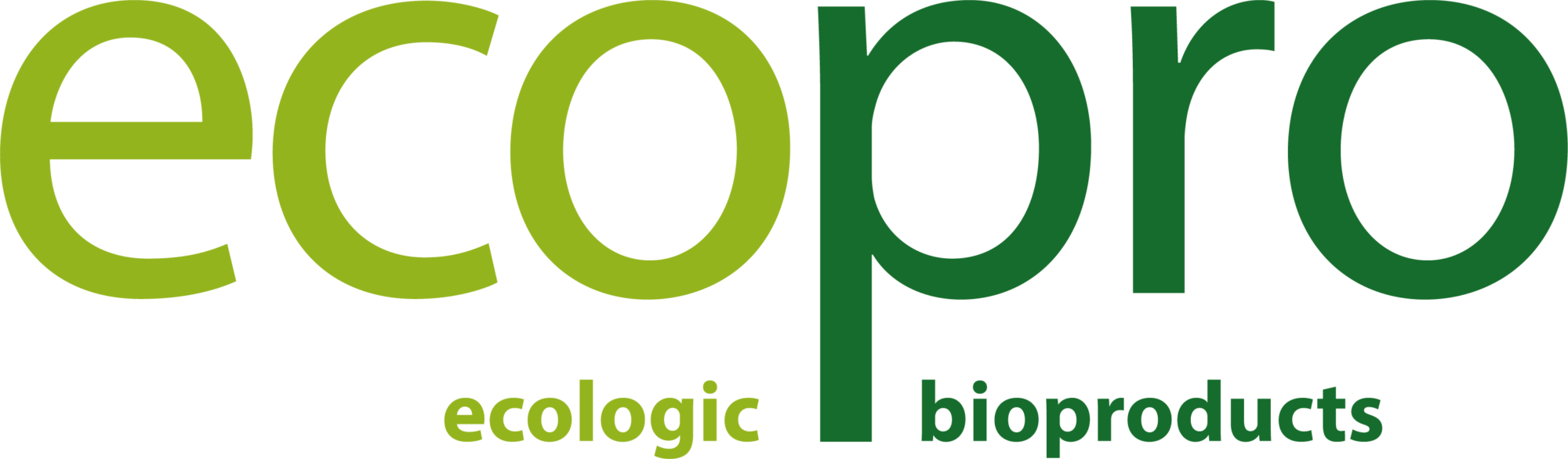
- Type: Joint venture
- Industry: Waste management
- Founded: 14 August 2002; 24 years ago
- Headquarters: Verdal, Norway
- Area served: Central Norway
- Number of employees: 10
- Subsidiaries: Ecogas
- Website: ecopro.no

Ecopro AS, originally known as Midt-Norsk Kompost AS, is an industrial company which owns and operates a biogas manucaturing plant at Skjørdalen in Verdal, Norway, with sludge and wet organic waste as input factors. The refined biogas powers the fleet of 100 biogas buses in Trondheim, and the resulting compost fertilizer is sold to local farmers. The facility was the first biogas manufacturing plant in Norway when it opened in 2008. It has received major expansions in 2017 and 2022.

The facility receives and processes all wet organic waste and sludge from household and commercial facilities in Trøndelag, Nordmøre, northern Østerdalen and southern Helgeland. It is owned by seven municipalities and intermunicipal waste management agencies: Fjellregionen Interkommunale Avfallsselskap (FIAS), Fosen Renovasjon, Innherred Renovasjon (IR), Midtre Namdal Avfallsselskap (MNA), ReMidt, Steinkjer Municipality, Søndre Helgeland Miljøverk and Trondheim Renholdsverk (TRV).

== Operations ==
The facility is located at Skjørdalen in Verdal. The facility receives 45 tonnes annually of wet organic waste and sludge from seven municipal and intermunicipal waste management agencies, who also own the company. These cover a population of 343,000 in 57 municipalities. The waste management agencies deliver the waste to transit stations, and they are then hauled in bulk to Verdal. The cite produced biogas with an energy of 37 GWh, replacing 600,000 liters of diesel per year. The refinement is carried out by the subsidiary Gaspro. Distribution of the gas is done by Gasnor. Ecopro has ten employees.

== History ==
Ecopro has its background in the wet organic waste and sludge operations of Innherred Renovasjon. They had started with waste sorting with separate consumer containers for wet organic waste in 1994, and built a composting facility at Skjørdalen in 1995 to handle the waste. At the time, they had built a separate facility for sludge at Ørin, also in Verdal. By 2000 the facility was also accepting wet organic waste from Steinkjer and MNA.

The next step was to establish a biofuel facility at Skjørdalen. Cooperation agreements were made with 41 municipalities in Trøndelag and Helgeland. The company was incporated on 14 August 2002, and was originally named Midt-Norsk Kompost. The manucaturing plant opened in 2008.

From 2016 the facility started receiving sludge from fish farming. According to Ecopro, they were the first facility in the world to make biogas out of fish sludge. A second factory opened at Skjørdalen in December 2017. It produced biofuel which was sold to operate buses in Trondheim.

In 2020, the owner companies all granted Ecopro a twenty-year monopoly on accepting their wet organic waste and sludge. This allowed for a 43 million kroner expansion to be completed in 2002. This increased annual intake from 7 thousand to 45 thousand tonnes per year.

== Bibliography ==
- Stavrum, Pål (2005). 20 års renovasjonsrevolusjon (PDF) (in Norwegian). Verdal: Innherred Renovasjon. Archived from the original (PDF) on 25 May 2015.
