= Romsdalshalvøya Interkommunale Renovasjonsselskap =

Norwegian waste collection agency

Romsdalshalvøya Interkommunale Renovasjonsselskap IKS
- Type: Inter-municipal company
- Industry: Waste management
- Founded: 28 February 1983; 43 years ago
- Headquarters: Molde, Norway
- Area served: Romsdal
- Website: rir.no

Romsdalshalvøya Interkommunale Renovasjonsselskap IKS (RIR) is an inter-municipal waste management agency serving Romsdal in Norway. Headquartered in Molde, it is owned by and serves the municipalities of Aukra, Hustadvika, Gjemnes, Molde and Rauma, serving 60 thousand people. RIR was established on 28 February 1983. It has since 2004 been organized as an interkommunalt selskap. The main waste management facility is situated at Årødalen in Årø, Molde.

RIR had traditionally tendered out waste collection to private companies. On 1 October 2016, a new contract period started, with RenoNorden. It soon turned out that RenoNorden had bid too low to cover their operational costs, and that they were losing about 3.5 million kroner per year on the contract with RIR. RenoNorden had delivered loss bids with a large number of municipalities, and was at the brink of bankruptcy. RIR therefore in 2017 accepted that RenoNorden terminate its contract, in exchange for compensation. All of RenoNordens employees and vehicles used for the RIR contract were therefor transferred to RIR on 1 September 2017 and the new subsidiary RIR Transport AS.

Despite being located in Romsdal, Rauma chose in 1999 to join Nordmøre Interkommunale Renovasjonsselskap (NIR) instead of RIR. The one main reason was that NIR had an incinerator and was able to accept wet organic waste along with the general garbage, instead of it being sent to a dedicated composting site, as RIR did. Rauma also regarded NIR as more accommodating to local needs, while RIR had a one-size-fits-all approach. An example of this was that in Rauma, NIR continued to subcontract waste collection and operation of the recycling center to J.O. Moen Miljø, while RIR operated a single tender for the whole region. Rauma was also allowed to continue using waste bags for collection, instead of waste containers. This was somewhat more efficient to collect, and thus cut costs. Rauma left NIR for RIR during 2019.
