= Fosen Renovasjon =

Norwegian waste collection agency

Fosen Renovasjon IKS
- Type: Inter-municipal company
- Industry: Waste management
- Founded: 1997; 29 years ago
- Headquarters: Årnset, Indre Fosen, Norway
- Area served: Fosen
- Revenue: 90 million kroner (2023)
- Number of employees: 30 (2023)
- Website: fosenrenovasjon.no

Fosen Renovasjon IKS is an intermunicipal waste management agency covering most of Fosen, Norway. It is owned by and serves the municipalities of Indre Fosen, Ørland and Åfjord. The company is based in Årnset. As of 2023 it had 30 employees, had an annual revenue of 90 million kroner, and handled 14,000 tonnes of waste.

The agency was established in 1997 and became operational the following year. At the time it covered the municipalities of Rissa, Ørland, Bjugn and Åfjord. The two northern-most Fosen municipalities, Roan and Osen, had joined Midtre Namdal Avfallsselskap in 1995. Leksvik chose to join Innherred Renovasjon in 1997.

Fosen Renovasjon had subcontracted its waste collection on a public tender, which was won by RenoNorden. The company filed for bankruptcy in September 2017, leaving Fosen without an operator. Fosen Renovasjon chose to not place the operations on a new tender, but instead to operate the waste collection itself. It subsequently hired the staff and bought vehicles.

Leksvik merged with Rissa to form Indre Fosen Municipality on 1 January 2018. Fosen Renovasjon took over the responsibility for waste management for all of Indre Fosen on 1 January 2020.
