= HAMOS Forvaltning =

Norwegian waste collection agency

- Type: Inter-municipal company
- Industry: Waste management
- Founded: 6 November 1995; 30 years ago
- Defunct: 1 January 2020; 6 years ago
- Fate: Merger
- Successor: ReMidt
- Headquarters: Orkanger, Norway
- Area served: Nordmøre, Uttrøndelag
- Subsidiaries: ReTrans Midt (33%)
- Website: hamos.no at the Wayback Machine

HAMOS Forvaltning was an inter-municipal waste management agency for parts of Uttrøndelag and Nordmøre, Norway. HAMOS was headquartered in Orkanger. It was founded as Renovasjonsselskapet HAMOS in 1995, and merged to create ReMidt in 2020.

== History ==
The agency was established on 6 November 1995 and originally had five owner municipalities: Hemne, Agdenes, Meldal, Orkdal and Snillfjord, hence the abbreviation HAMOS. The agency was originally named Renovasjonsselskapet HAMOS. Skaun joined on 1 January 1997, followed by Rindal on 1 January 1999. The agency changed its name to HAMOS Forvaltning in 2004, and was at the same time reorganized as an interkommunalt selskap. Hitra and Frøya joined on 1 January 2006, followed by Rennebu on 1 January 2008. The final participant was Surnadal, who joined on 1 January 2011.

From 1 May 2018, HAMOS Forvaltning joined the joint venture ReTrans Midt, which took over the operations of the waste collection. This had previously been done by HAMOS' subsidiary Retura ST. ReTrans was jointly owned by Midtre Namdal Avfallsselskap and Innherred Renovasjon. By merging their operations into a single company, the agencies aimed at achieving economies of scale. An example of this was a common workshop in Levanger. HAMOS owned the commercial subsidiary Retura Sør-Trøndelag, part of the Retura franchise.

HAMOS merged with Envina and Nordmøre Interkommunale Renovasjonsselskap on 1 January 2020 to create ReMidt, a process that had started two years in advance.
