= Midtbygda =

Midtbygda may refer to the following places in Norway:

- Midtbygda, Røyken, Buskerud county
- Midtbygda, Trøndelag
