= Feren =

Lake in Trøndelag, Norway

- Interactive map of the lake
- Location: Trøndelag
- Coordinates: 63.5689°N 11.8322°E
- Primary outflows: Fora river
- Catchment area: Stjørdalselva
- Basin countries: Norway
- Max. length: 11 kilometres (6.8 mi)
- Max. width: 4 kilometres (2.5 mi)
- Surface area: 25.88 km^{2} (9.99 sq mi)
- Shore length^{1}: 33 kilometres (21 mi)
- Surface elevation: 401 metres (1,316 ft)
- References: NVE
- ^{1} Shore length is not a well-defined measure.

Feren is a lake in Meråker Municipality in Trøndelag county, Norway. A small part in the northwestern corner of the lake extends into the municipalities of Stjørdal, Levanger, and Verdal at the outlet into the river Forra. The 26-square-kilometre (10 sq mi) lake lies about 14 kilometres (8.7 mi) north of the municipal center of Midtbygda, about 2.5 kilometres (1.6 mi) north of the lake Funnsjøen, and about 8 kilometres (5.0 mi) north of the lake Fjergen.

== See also ==
- List of lakes in Norway
