= Dag Lyseid =

Norwegian footballer and politician (1954-2013)

Dag Lyseid (12 February 1954 – 2 January 2013) was a Norwegian footballer and politician for the Labour Party.

He played as a defender for SFK Lyn between 1973 and 1982, the first and sixth season in the First Division (highest tier). He made his debut against Frigg in May 1973, and played 117 league games and 15 cup games for Lyn, never scoring a goal. He grew up at Ullevål, and studied in Oslo and Trondheim.

He settled in Meråker Municipality, where he was a sheep farmer at Stordalen and eventually entered the civil service. From 1992 to 1994 he served as director of health and social services in Meråker Municipality. He was later personnel director and faculty director at the University of Trondheim and NTNU, later in the Norwegian Labour and Welfare Administration in Stjørdal Municipality.

As a politician he was elected to the municipal council for Meråker Municipality in 1995, serving as deputy mayor from 1999 to 2008. He then went on a hiatus to concentrate on his Labour and Welfare Administration job. In the 2011 Norwegian local elections he made a comeback and was elected to Nord-Trøndelag county council. He died in January 2013.
