= Fjergen =

Lake in Trøndelag, Norway

- Interactive map of the lake
- Location: Meråker Municipality, Trøndelag
- Coordinates: 63.4525°N 11.9547°E
- Primary outflows: Kåpperåa
- Catchment area: Stjørdalselva
- Basin countries: Norway
- Max. length: 9 kilometres (5.6 mi)
- Max. width: 3.5 kilometres (2.2 mi)
- Surface area: 14.41 km^{2} (5.56 sq mi)
- Water volume: 204,000,000 m^{3} (267,000,000 yd^{3})
- Shore length^{1}: 35 kilometres (22 mi)
- Surface elevation: 507 metres (1,663 ft)
- References: NVE
- ^{1} Shore length is not a well-defined measure.

Fjergen is a lake in Meråker Municipality in Trøndelag county, Norway. The 14.41-square-kilometre (5.56 sq mi) lake has a hydropower dam on the southern end which flows out into the Kåpperåa river which is part of the Stjørdalselva river system. There is about 204,000,000 cubic metres (7.2×10^{9} cu ft) of water stored in the lake.

The lake is located about 5 kilometres (3.1 mi) north of the village of Kopperå and about 7 kilometres (4.3 mi) northeast of the municipal center of Midtbygda. The lakes Feren and Funnsjøen lie several kilometers to the northwest, and the border with Sweden lies a few kilometers to the east.

== See also ==
- List of lakes in Norway
