= Funnsjøen =

Lake in Trøndelag, Norway

- Interactive map of the lake
- Location: Meråker Municipality, Trøndelag
- Coordinates: 63.5253°N 11.7118°E
- Primary outflows: Funna
- Catchment area: Stjørdalselva
- Basin countries: Norway
- Max. length: 8 kilometres (5.0 mi)
- Max. width: 3 kilometres (1.9 mi)
- Surface area: 7.99 km^{2} (3.08 sq mi)
- Water volume: 64,000,000 m^{3} (84,000,000 yd^{3})
- Shore length^{1}: 25 kilometres (16 mi)
- Surface elevation: 442 metres (1,450 ft)
- References: NVE
- ^{1} Shore length is not a well-defined measure.

Funnsjøen is a lake in Meråker Municipality in Trøndelag county, Norway. The 8-square-kilometre (3.1 sq mi) lake flows into the Funna river, a part of the Stjørdalselva river system. The lake has a hydropower dam at the southern end of the lake. There is about 64,000,000 cubic metres (84,000,000 yd^{3}) of water stored behind the dame in the lake.

The lake is located about 6.5 kilometres (4.0 mi) north of the municipal center of Midtbygda. The lake Feren lies north of the lake and the lake Fjergen lies southeast of the lake.

== See also ==
- List of lakes in Norway
