= Gaulosen =

Fjord in Trøndelag, Norway

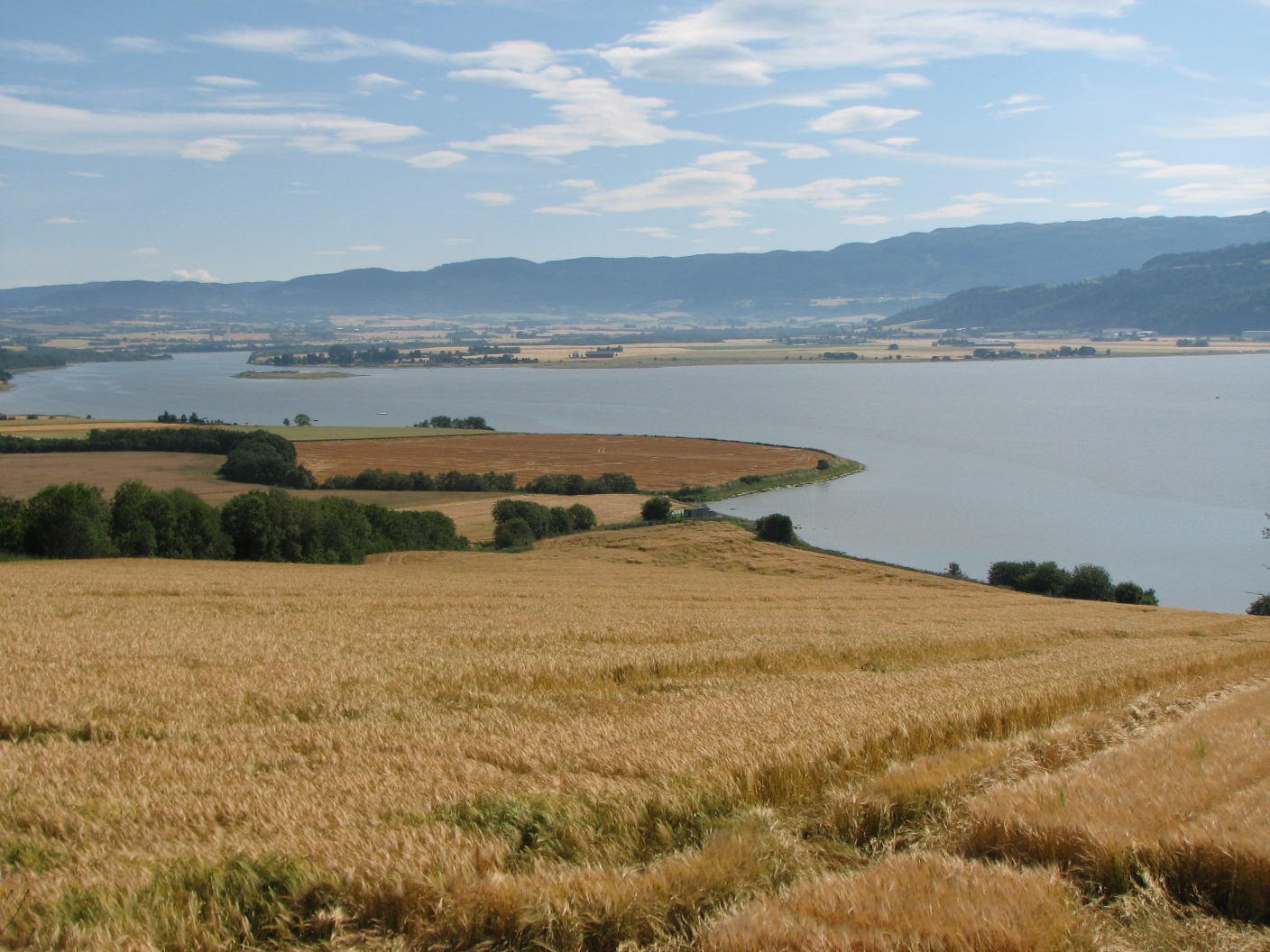
- View of the fjord and Øysand
- Interactive map of the fjord
- Location: Trøndelag county, Norway
- Coordinates: 63.33258°N 10.18799°E
- Type: Fjord
- Basin countries: Norway
- Max. length: 11 kilometres (6.8 mi)

Gaulosen is a fjord in Trøndelag county, Norway. The 11-kilometre (6.8 mi) long fjord is an arm off the large Trondheimsfjorden. The fjord forms the border between Trondheim Municipality, Skaun Municipality, and Melhus Municipality. The river Gaula flows into the fjord at Øysand.

This is the only major river delta in southern Norway that has not been affected by land reclamation, and has been used as an industrial area and airport. However, there has been no shortage of plans throughout history to exploit the area. During World War II, the Germans planned to build a large city, Neu-Drontheim at Øysand and in Leinstrand. You can still see the remains of a submarine harbor in Buvikberga between Øysand and Buvika. There are now four nature reserves and a landscape conservation area here.

== See also ==
- List of Norwegian fjords
