= Inntrøndelag =

District in Trøndelag, Norway

Coordinates: 63.7464°N 11.2996°E

Inntrøndelag (sometimes spelled Inn-Trøndelag) is a sub-region consisting of the central part of the county of Trøndelag, Norway. It consists of the two traditional districts of Innherred and Stjørdalen.'

Administratively, the term was often used to describe the parts of the former county of Nord-Trøndelag excluding Namdalen. In this definition it gave name to for instance Inntrøndelag District Court (2011–21) and Inntrøndelag Police District (1910–2001).

== Definition ==
When used in the context of government bodies, Inntrøndelag has been used as a common term for Innherred and Stjørdalen. Using contemporary boundaries, it consists of the municipalities of Steinkjer, Inderøy, Verdal, Levanger, Frosta, Stjørdal, and Meråker.

Colloquially, Inntrøndelag is sometimes used more narrowly, for instance as a synonym to Innherred.

Historically, the ancient Frostating area was subdivided into two sub-areas: Inntrøndelag, with its seat at Mære, and Uttrøndelag, with its head seat at Øra (today Trondheim). Inntrøndelag therefore consisted of four sub-counties: Skøynafylke, Øynafylke, Verdølafylke and Sparbyggjafylke. The border between Inntrøndelag and Uttrøndelag therefor went through Frosta and Åsen, with those areas as well as the contemporary Stjørdalen belonging to Uttrøndelag.

== Linguistics ==
The Trøndersk dialect of the Norwegian language is classified with two major grousp: Inntrøndersk and Uttrøndersk. Inntrøndersk follows the interior from Oppdal Municipality to Røyrvik Municipality, while Uttrøndersk is spoken along the coast. The linguistic categorization gives a different geographic area than most geographic definitions.
