= Bård Langsåvold =

Norwegian politician (born 1952)

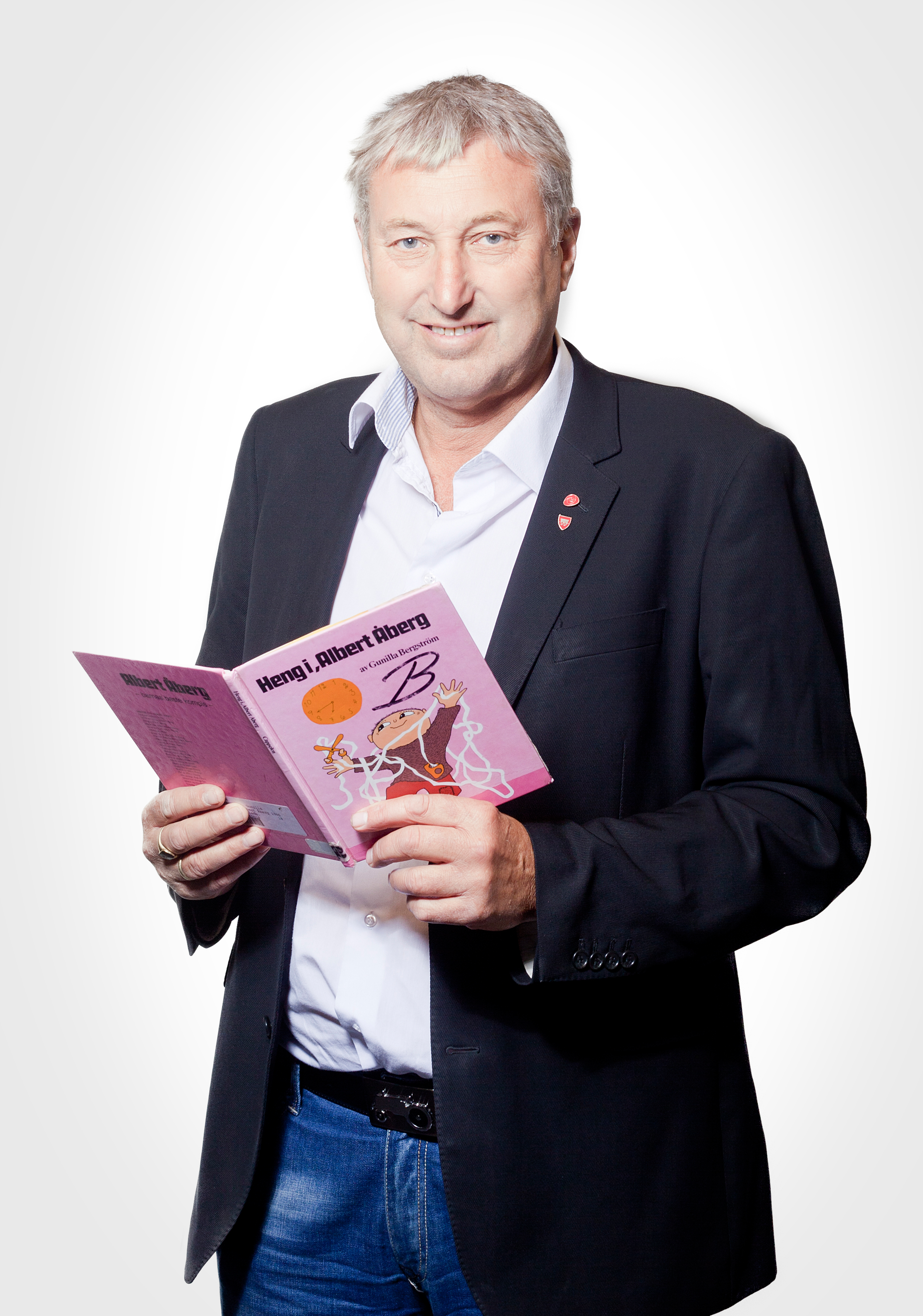
Bård Langsåvold

Bård Langsåvold (born 31 January 1952) is a Norwegian politician for the Labour Party.

He served as a deputy representative to the Parliament of Norway from Nord-Trøndelag during the terms 2005–2009 and 2009–2013. He is also mayor of Meråker Municipality since 1995.
