= Nordmøre Interkommunale Renovasjonsselskap =

Norwegian waste collection agency

Nordmøre Interkommunale Renovasjonsselskap IKS
- Type: Inter-municipal company
- Industry: Waste management
- Predecessors: Indre Nordmøre Renovasjon
- Founded: 1989; 37 years ago
- Defunct: 1 January 2020; 6 years ago
- Fate: Merger
- Successor: ReMidt
- Headquarters: Kristiansund, Norway
- Area served: Central Norway
- Website: nir.mr.no

Nordmøre Interkommunale Renovasjonsselskap IKS (NIR) was an inter-municipal waste management agency for nine municipalities predominantly in Nordmøre in Norway: Aure, Averøy, Halsa, Kristiansund, Oppdal, Rauma, Smøla, Sunndal and Tingvoll. NIR was incorporated as an interkommunalt selskap, and covered a population of 62.000.

NIR was founded in 1989 as Indre Nordmøre Renovasjon. From 1994 to 1999 it had seven municipalities as owners. NIR merged with Envina and HAMOS Forvaltning to create ReMidt from 1 January 2020.

Rauma was the only owner municipality in Romsdal to belong to NIR. The remaining municipalities in Romsdal belong to their own inter-municipal agency, Romsdalshalvøya Interkommunale Renovasjonsselskap (RIR). Rauma chose to join NIR in 1999 for two reasons. NIR operated a incinerator which could accept wet organic waste, and therefore municipalities tied to NIR did not have to sort their organic waste. Rauma also regarded NIR as more accommodating to local needs, while RIR had a one-size-fits-all approach. An example of this was that in Rauma, NIR continued to subcontract waste collection and operation of the recycling center to J.O. Moen Miljø, while RIR operated a single tender for the whole region. Rauma was also allowed to continue using waste bags for collection, instead of waste containers. This was somewhat more efficient to collect, and thus cut costs. Rauma left NIR for RIR during 2019.
