= Stordalsvollen =

Village in Meråker Municipality, Norway

Stordalsvollen Stordalen / Stordal
- Village
- Interactive map of Stordalsvollen
- Location within Trøndelag Location within Norway
- Coordinates: 63.31428°N 11.84468°E
- Country: Norway
- Region: Central Norway
- County: Trøndelag
- District: Stjordalen
- Municipality: Meråker Municipality
- Elevation: 658 m (2,159 ft)
- Time zone: UTC+01:00 (CET)
  - Summer (DST): UTC+02:00 (CEST)
- Post Code: 7530 Meråker

Stordalsvollen (also: Stordalen or Stordal) is a small village area in Meråker Municipality in Trøndelag county, Norway. It is located in the Dalådalen valley about 14 kilometres (8.7 mi) southeast of the municipal center of Midtbygda. It is the location of Stordalen Chapel.
