= Anton Fridrichsen =

Norwegian-born Swedish theologian (1888–1953)

Anton Johnson Fridrichsen (4 January 1888 – 16 November 1953) was a Norwegian-born Swedish theologian.

== Biography ==
He was born at Meråker Municipality in Nord-Trøndelag county, Norway. He received his cand. theol. degree in 1911 and then studied ancient Christian theology and classical philology at the University of Breslau and the University of Göttingen. In 1925 he received his theological doctorate from the University of Strasbourg. He was appointed professor of exegesis at the Uppsala University from 1928. Among his works are Hagios-Qadoš from 1916, and his thesis from 1925 Le Problème du miracle dans le christianisme primitif .
