= Meråker Church =

Church in Trøndelag, Norway

- Meråker kirke
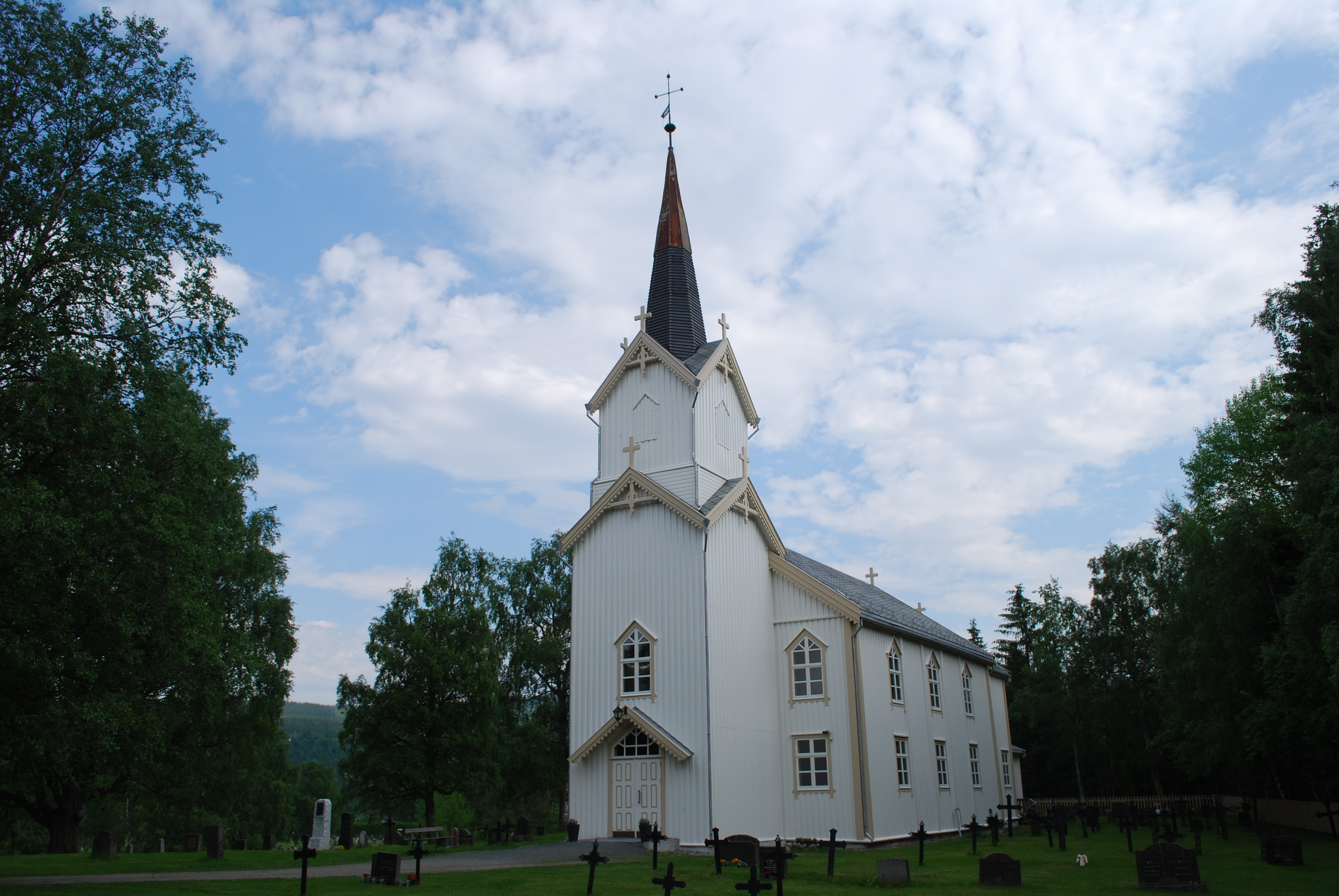
- View of the church
- Meråker Church
- 63.429890845°N 11.716487109°E
- Location: Meråker Municipality, Trøndelag
- Country: Norway
- Denomination: Church of Norway
- Churchmanship: Evangelical Lutheran

History
- Status: Parish church
- Founded: 1619
- Consecrated: 16 Dec 1874

Architecture
- Functional status: Active
- Architect: Peder Olsen
- Architectural type: Long church
- Completed: 1874 (152 years ago)

Specifications
- Capacity: 320
- Materials: Wood

Administration
- Diocese: Nidaros bispedømme
- Deanery: Stjørdal prosti
- Parish: Meråker
- Norwegian Cultural Heritage Site
- Type: Church
- Status: Automatically protected
- ID: 84940

Meråker Church (Norwegian: Meråker kirke) is a parish church of the Church of Norway in Meråker Municipality in Trøndelag county, Norway. It is located just northwest of the village of Midtbygda. It is one of the three churches in the Meråker parish which is part of the Stjørdal prosti (deanery) in the Diocese of Nidaros. The white, wooden church was built in a long church style in 1874 by the architect Peder Olsen and the lead builder Erik Nanstad. The church seats about 320 people.

== History ==
There was very likely a church in Meråker during the Middle Ages, but the dates are not known. The first churches in Meråker where located at Kjørkbyen (Kirkeby), about 3.6 kilometres (2.2 mi) northwest of the present site of the church. After the Black Death in Norway many people perished and the whole Meråker area was depopulated and no Norwegians lived there from around 1350 until the late-1500s and early-1600s. The earliest existing historical records of the church in Meråker date back to around the year 1619, when a new church was built at Kjørkbyen, the historic site of the church in Meråker. The new church was built and supported by the local residents and the Bishop in Trondheim was said to be less than enthusiastic about the new church.

In 1691, the small church from 1619 was torn down and replaced with a new, larger church on the same site. During the construction of the new church, many bones and coffins were found beneath the church, leading people to understand that a medieval church must have stood on this site prior to the Black Death. In 1793, another new church was built at Kjørkbyen to replace the previous one. The new timber-framed church was rectangular, almost square in shape. It had a tower on the roof and its main entrance was in the middle of the south wall of the nave.

In 1874, the old church was disassembled and moved closer to the main village, Midtbygda, where most of the municipal residents lived. The last church service at the old site was on 25 May 1874. The new church site was about 3.6 kilometres (2.2 mi) southeast of the historic site of the church. The new church was built using some of the reclaimed wood from the old church. The new church was designed by Peder Olsen and built by builder Erik Nonstad, both were from Åsen. The new church was consecrated on 16 December 1874. In the summer of 1937, the church was restored according to plans by Roar Tønseth.

== Media gallery ==
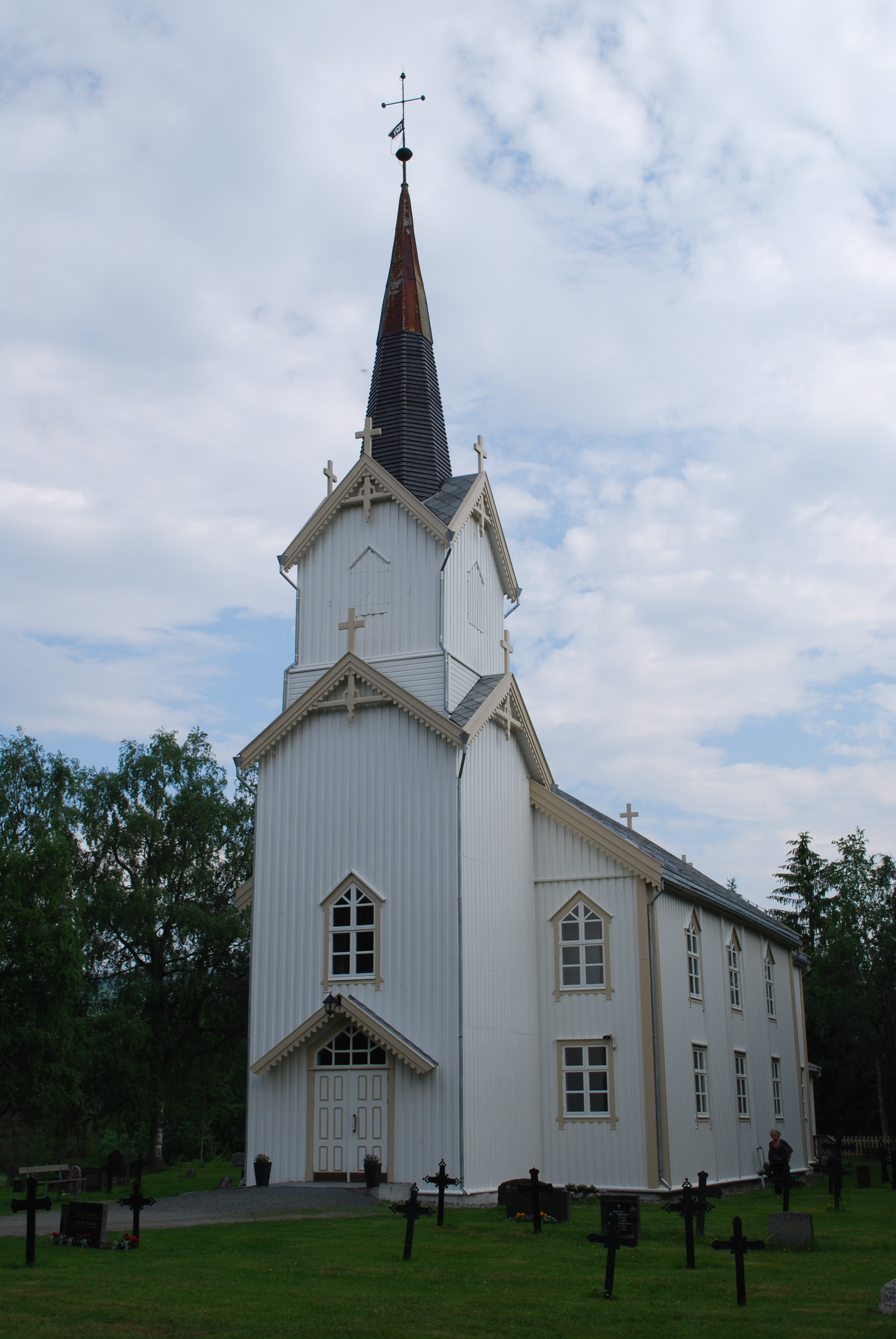

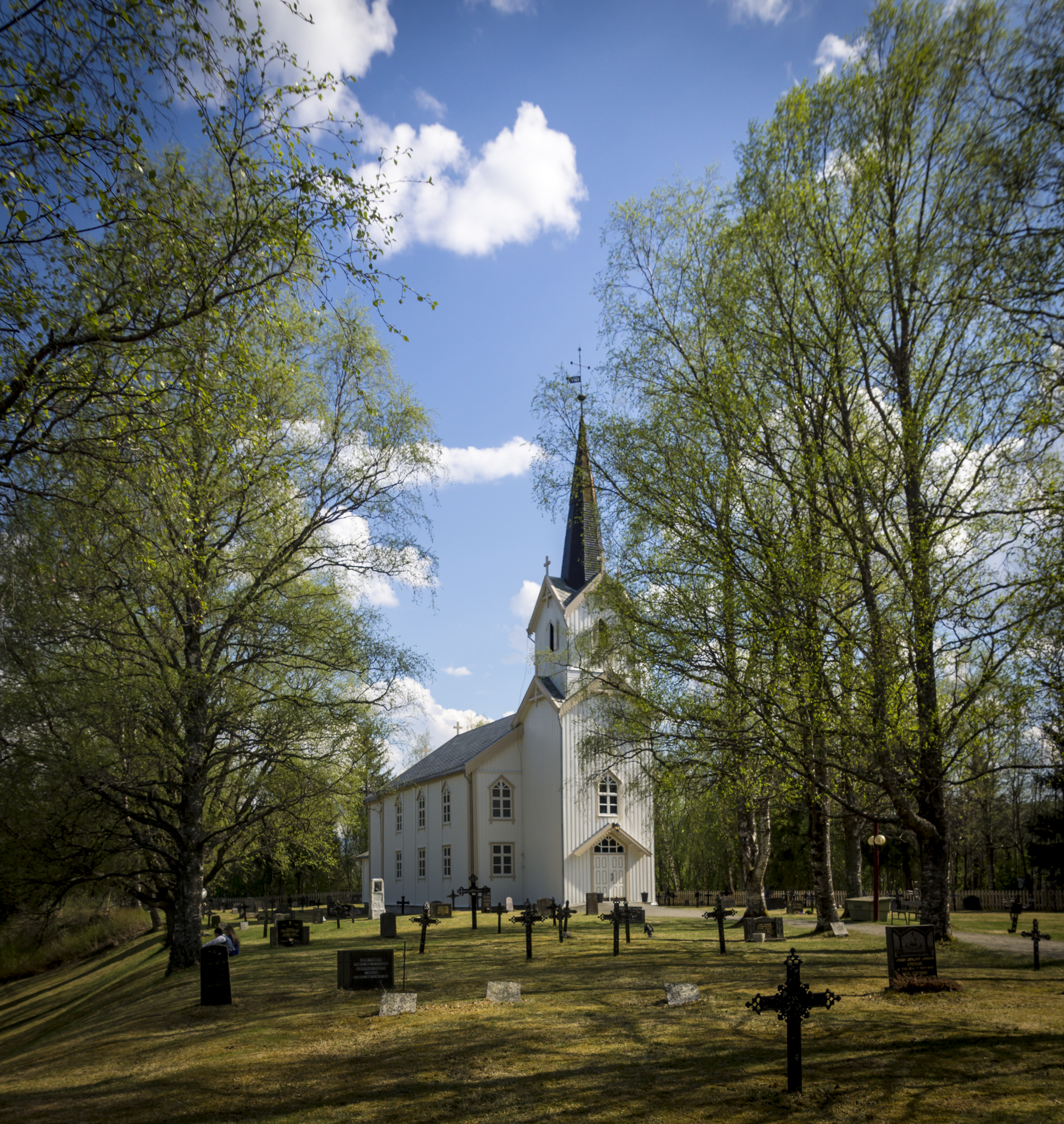

== See also ==
- List of churches in Nidaros
