= Envina =

Norwegian waste collection agency

Envina IKS
- Type: Inter-municipal company
- Industry: Waste management
- Founded: 2003; 23 years ago
- Defunct: 1 January 2020; 6 years ago
- Fate: Merger
- Successor: ReMidt
- Headquarters: Melhus, Norway
- Area served: Melhus, Midtre Gauldal and Klæbu
- Number of employees: 23 (2012)
- Website: envina.no

Envina IKS was an intermunicipal waste management agency covering Melhus, Midtre Gauldal and Klæbu in Trøndelag, Norway.

The entity was organized as an interkommunalt selskap. As of 2012 it had 23 employees, and 9.961 subscribers. The agency was established in 2003 and became operational in 2004. It has its head office in Melhus. Klæbu left the company on 1 January 2018, when it became part of Trondheim Municipality, and operations were taken over by Trondheim Renholdsverk. Envina merged with HAMOS Forvaltning and Nordmøre Interkommunale Renovasjonsselskap on 1 January 2020 to form ReMidt.
