= Stordalen Chapel =

Church in Trøndelag, Norway

- Stordalen kapell
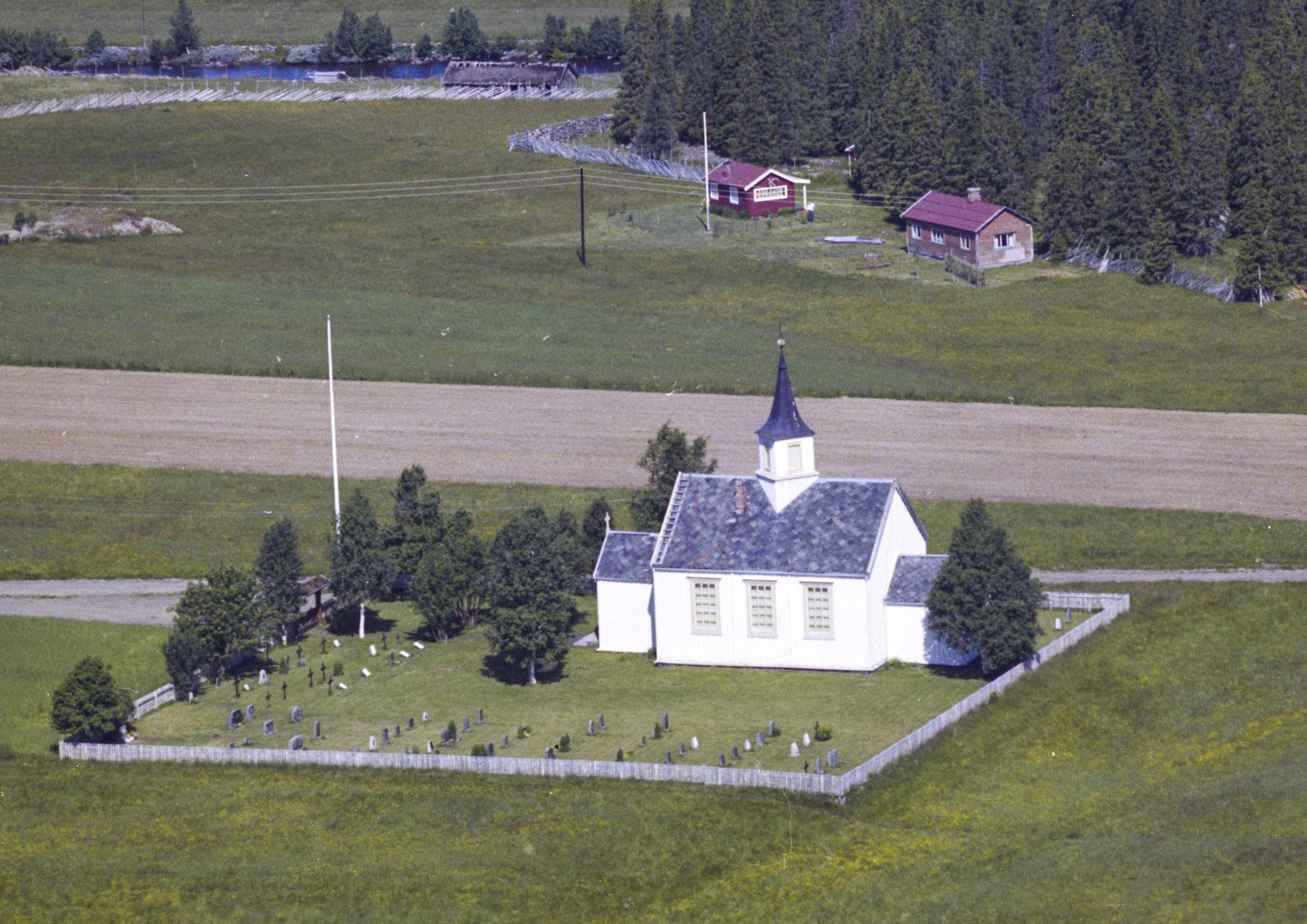
- View of the church
- Stordalen Chapel
- 63.312614718°N 11.850876510°E
- Location: Meråker Municipality, Trøndelag
- Country: Norway
- Denomination: Church of Norway
- Churchmanship: Evangelical Lutheran

History
- Status: Parish church
- Founded: 1863
- Consecrated: 22 July 1863

Architecture
- Functional status: Active
- Architect: Jacob Wilhelm Nordan
- Architectural type: Long church
- Completed: 1863 (163 years ago)

Specifications
- Capacity: 130
- Materials: Wood

Administration
- Diocese: Nidaros bispedømme
- Deanery: Stjørdal prosti
- Parish: Meråker
- Norwegian Cultural Heritage Site
- Type: Church
- Status: Listed
- ID: 85578

Stordalen Chapel (Norwegian: Stordalen kapell) is a parish church of the Church of Norway in Meråker Municipality in Trøndelag county, Norway. It is located in the village of Stordalen. It is one of the three churches in the Meråker parish which is part of the Stjørdal prosti (deanery) in the Diocese of Nidaros. The white and yellow, wooden church was built in a long church style in 1863 by the architect Jacob Wilhelm Nordan. The church seats about 130 people.

== History ==
A Royal Decree on 28 October 1861 granted permission for the parish to build a chapel on Stordalen in Meråker for the people who lived in the Stordalen and Teveldalen valleys along the border with Sweden. The chapel was designed by Jacob Wilhelm Nordan. The lead builder for the construction was Gunnar Hågensen Gresset from Hegra. Stordalen Chapel was consecrated on 22 July 1863.

== See also ==
- List of churches in Nidaros
