= Midtre Namdal Avfallsselskap =

Norwegian waste collection agency

Midtre Namdal Avfallsselskap IKS
- Type: Inter-municipal company
- Industry: Waste management
- Founded: 11 September 1979; 47 years ago
- Headquarters: Overhalla, Norway
- Area served: Namdalen
- Subsidiaries: ReTrans Midt (33%)
- Website: http://www.mna.no

Midtre Namdal Avfallsselskap IKS (MNA) is an inter-municipal waste management agency for Namdalen in Trøndelag, Norway. It operates household waste collection throughout its owner municipalities, through its joint venture ReTrans Midt. MNA has commercial collection through Retura NT. The main waste processing site is at Stormyra at Sandmoen in Overhalla.

MNA was founded in 1979. It is now owned by and covers the municipalities of Bindal, Flatanger, Grgon, Høylandet, Leka, Lierne, Namsos, Namsskogen, Nærøysund, Osen, Overhalla and Røyrvik, with about 40 thousand residents.

== History ==
=== Background and establishment ===
As late as the 1960s, waste management in Namdalen was seen as a problem for the individual residents and companies. The municipalities would build one or more landfills, and it would be up to individuals and companies to deliver to it. Burning one's own trash was commonplace. Namsos Municipality was the first municipality in Central Namdalen to establish a municipal waste management department.

The Regional Planning Council for the six municipalities in Central Namdalen (Flatanger, Grong, Høylandet, Namdalseid, Namsos and Overhall), made a decision in May 1974 to start working on establishing an inter-municipal waste management agency for the region. A central part of the plan was to establish a single, central landfill. Various locations were considered, including Gryta, Meosen, Tavlåa, Otterøya, Barstadmyene, before landing on Stormyra at Sandmoen in Overhalla. The main concern with this location was its proximity to the river Namsen, resulting in protests from interest groups associated with the river.

The first constituent meeting in the inter-municipal company was held on 17 October 1978. The company was formally incorporated on 11 September 1979. In the first years, it was organized as an interesseselskap, with the six municipalities as members. It was originally headquartered in the municipal hall in Overhalla, before moving to Barlia in October 1991.

=== Early operations ===
A contract to build a facility was signed with Thune-Eureka, and cost 7 million kroner. The landfill and recycling center at Sandmoen opened on 26 February 1981. Five compressors were bought and placed at various locations. The waste collectors would take the waste there. It would be compressed and then freighted onwards to Sandmoen.

MNA rented Namsos' municipal waste collection truck and hired to people to operate it within the town of Namsos. The rest of the waste collection was contrated to private operators: Asbjørn Stamnes in Namdalseid and Flatanger; Steinar Veiseth in Klinga, Spillum, Ottersøy and Ytre Vemundvik; Peder Tømmerås and Håvard Haug in Grong and Overhalla; and Einar Almaas in Høylandet.

The overriding principle of MNA was that it would charge a fee to all residents to cover its operating costs. Since this was a new fee, there was several protests against it from residents, especially in Namdalseid. There were several political discussions regarding giving discounts to various families, especially the elderly and those on welfare benefits. There were a number of sabotages against the new system. Some people made it clear they would refuse to deliver in their waste, but place it at the beach like they always had done.

Stormoen originally consisted of a grinder, allowing a more efficient use of the landfill. There was also built a composting area. In 1984 a water treatment system was installed at Stormoen to avoid drainage water from the landfill going into the river.

During the late 1980s, MNA and Nord-Trøndelag Elektrisitetsverk looked into the possibilities of establishing district heating in Namsos. Nothing came of the plan, and it was shelved in 1989.

=== Recycling ===
By 1987, the main start-up issues had been resolved. MNA therefor could move on to start collections of batteries. In addition to special containers, the work involved a massive information campaign to the public. The project was so successful, that the marketing material was used throughout Central Norway. Once a good system had been established, MNA next tacled hazardous waste. The same branding team created the mascot Skvett'n, originally in collaboration with the other waste management agencies in Nord-Trøndelag. The information campaign was later expanded to the whole country. Thirty-six depots for handing in hazardous waste was established within MNA's area.

Separate collection of paper started in Høylandet in 1989, but was dependent on volunteers collecting it and transporting it to Stormyra. It was soon replaced with 23 points to deliver paper. Nord-Trøndelag got a waste management plan in 1993, which helped kick-start more systematic recycling. From then a waste collection truck would drive a route and collect paper. At first it was exported abroad, but from about 2000 a used paper factory was opened at Norske Skog Skogn.

At the facility in Overhalla, MNA had started developing and selling a number of products related to waste collection. This part of the operation was spun off to the subsidiary Namdal Ressurs in 1991. The company also entered waste management consulting, which was again spun off in the subdidiary Ressurs Consulting. Namdal Ressurs underwent a share emission in 2001, leading to MNA becoming a minority shareholder. Namdal Ressurs had a revenue of 20 million kroner in 2003.

The county plan also encouraged more municipalities to join the inter-municipal waste management agencies. This resulted in Nærøy and Vikna joining in 1993; Bindal, Leka and Fosnes in 1994; and then Osen and Roan in 1995. With the latter two in Sør-Trøndelag and Bindal in Nordland, this meant that MNA had municipalities in three counties.

MNA established a used store in Namsos in 1994, called NyGammel ("NewOld").

National authorities banned landfilling of wet organic waste. This forced MNA to have a separate collection of this type of waste, which was originally composted at Stormyra. This created a smell that was unbearable for residents nearby. As a result, composting at Stormyra was terminated, and the waste was instead transported to Innherred Renovasjon's facility at Skjørdalen in Verdal.

A fee on landfilling was introduced in 1999, to incentivize less landfill. As many Norwegian waste managers did, MNA transported its general waste to Sweden, where it was incinerated. Differentiated fees were introduced in the 1990s.

=== Outsourced and insourced collection ===
From 1 July 2004, the municipal waste management agencies lost their monopoly on collecting and handling waste from commercial enterprises. The law came into force several years in advance. At the time MNA had tendered out its collection to Norsk Gjenvinning (NG). NG started commercial collection of commercial waste several years before they were allowed to, using the customer lists which they had access to through the contract with MNA. This led to a major dispute between the two. Namdal Avfallstransport won the next contract, from 2002 to 2009. In order to conduct commercial waste collection, MNA established a subdidiary Retura NT AS, a franchise of Retura.

MNA joined several other waste management companies in Trøndelag to establish Ecopro in Skjørdalen. The facility opened in 2008, and converts all wet organic waste to biofuel. From 2012, drinking cartons and platic became their own category for consumers to sort. A three-bin system per household was introduced four years later.

The next contract was won by Sunde Renovasjon. It was bought by Namsos Trafikkselskap in 2012, and renamed NTS Miljø. It had a revenue of 12 million kroner in 2013, with thirteen employees and eight trucks. NTS sold this operation to RenoNorden in 2016.

Soon afterwards, new tenders were issued. For the municipalities of Leka, Vikna, Nærøy and Bindal, these were won by Miljøservice Ottersøy. Retur won the tender for the remaining municipalities. Miljøservice Ottersøy filed for bankruptcy in mid-2017, and collection was taken over by MNA itself on 1 August 2017. MNA terminated its contract with Retur in January 2018. MNA then partnered up with Innherred Renovasjon and HAMOS Forvaltning (later ReMidt) and founded ReTrans Midt, which took over all waste collection operations for MNA and the other two agencies from 1 May 2018. A key goal by creating ReTrans was to create sufficient economy of scale of the waste collection, for instance through a common workshop in Levanger.

The last three municipalities in Namdalen who were not part of MNA joined on 1 January 2020: Lierne, Namsskogan and Røyrvik. The same day, Nærøy and Vikna merged to form Nærøysund, and Fosnes and Namdalseid were merged into Namsos.

== Bibliography ==
- Pettersen, Bo; Kaarstad, Karl Erik (2004). Fra søppel til ressurs: med miljøet i sentrum: Midtre Namdal avfallsselskap 25 år 1979-2004 (in Norwegian). Overhalla: Midtre Namdal Avfallsselskap.
