= Meråker Municipality =

Municipality in Trøndelag, Norway

Meråker Municipality Meråker kommune Mearohke
- Municipality
- Meraaker herred (historic name); Meraker herred (historic name)
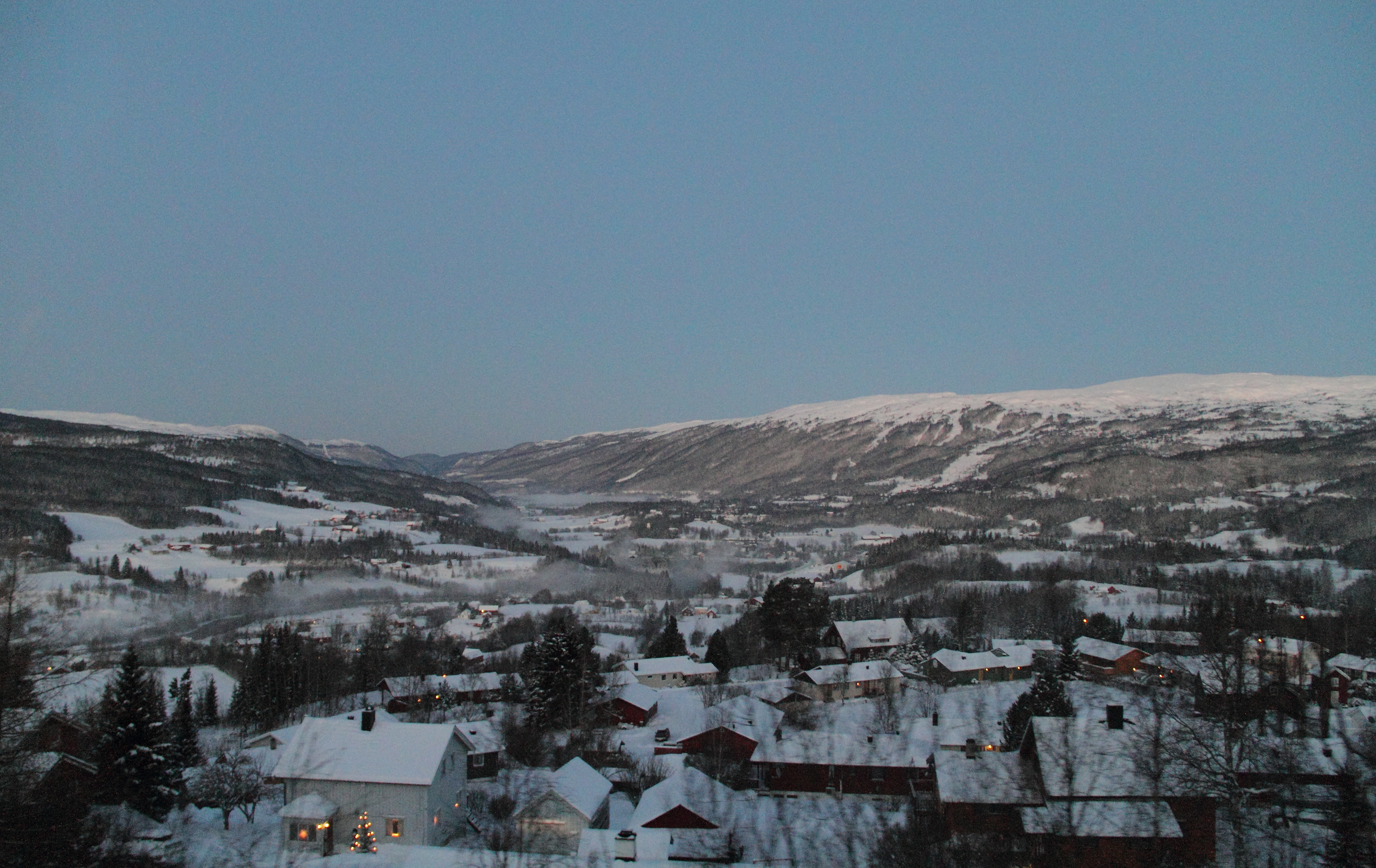
- View of the Meråker valley

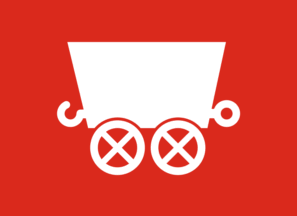
- Flag Coat of arms

- Trøndelag within Norway

- Meråker within Trøndelag
- Coordinates: 63°26′17″N 11°50′58″E
- Country: Norway
- County: Trøndelag
- District: Stjørdalen
- Established: 1 Jan 1874
  - Preceded by: Øvre Stjørdalen Municipality
- Administrative centre: Midtbygda

Government
  - Mayor (2023): Kari Anita Furunes (Sp)

Area
  - Total: 1,273.94 km^{2} (491.87 sq mi)
  - Land: 1,188.06 km^{2} (458.71 sq mi)
  - Water: 85.88 km^{2} (33.16 sq mi) 6.7%
  - Rank: #80 in Norway
- Highest elevation: 1,441.36 m (4,728.9 ft)

Population (2024)
  - Total: 2,454
  - Rank: #259 in Norway
  - Density: 1.9/km^{2} (4.9/sq mi)
  - Change (10 years): ▼ −3.9%
- Demonym: Meråkerbygg

Official language
  - Norwegian form: Bokmål
- Time zone: UTC+01:00 (CET)
  - Summer (DST): UTC+02:00 (CEST)
- ISO 3166 code: NO-5034
- Website: Official website

Meråker or Mearohke (Southern Sami) is a municipality in Trøndelag county, Norway. It is part of the Stjørdalen region. The administrative centre of the municipality is the village of Midtbygda which is about 20 kilometres (12 mi) west of Storlien in Sweden and 46 kilometres (29 mi) east of the town of Stjørdalshalsen in neighboring Stjørdal Municipality. Other villages in the municipality include Gudåa, Kopperå, and Stordalsvollen.

The 1,274-square-kilometre (492 sq mi) municipality is the 80th largest by area out of the 357 municipalities in Norway. Meråker Municipality is the 259th most populous municipality in Norway with a population of 2,454. The municipality's population density is 1.9 inhabitants per square kilometre (4.9/sq mi) and its population has decreased by 3.9% over the previous 10-year period.

The municipality markets itself as a recreational area. The main areas of employment are in industry and agriculture. The municipality is noted for its characteristic dialect.

== General information ==
The municipality of Meråker was established on 1 January 1874 when the old Øvre Stjørdalen Municipality was divided into two: Hegra Municipality (population: 3,409) in the east and Meråker Municipality (population: 1,861) in the west. The municipal borders have not changed since then. On 1 January 2018, the municipality switched from the old Nord-Trøndelag county to the new Trøndelag county.

=== Name ===
The municipality (originally the parish) is named after the old Meråker farm (spelled "Mørakre" around 1430) since the first Meråker Church was built there. The meaning of the first element is uncertain (maybe merr which means "mare" or mýrr which means "bog" or "marsh"). The last element is akr which means "field" or "acre". Historically, the name of the municipality was spelled Meraker. On 3 November 1917, a royal resolution changed the spelling of the name of the municipality to Meraaker. On 21 December 1917, a royal resolution enacted the 1917 Norwegian language reforms. Prior to this change, the name was spelled Meraaker with the digraph "aa", and after this reform, the name was spelled Meråker, using the letter å was instead.

=== Coat of arms ===
The coat of arms was granted on 28 September 1990. The official blazon is "Gules, a cart argent" (Norwegian: I rødt en sølv vogn). This means the arms have a red field (background) and the charge is a mining cart. The mining cart has a tincture of argent which means it is commonly colored white, but if it is made out of metal, then silver is used. This design was chosen to symbolize the fact that mining has traditionally played a major role in the area and has been of great economic importance for Meråker. The municipal flag has the same design as the coat of arms.

=== Churches ===
The Church of Norway has one parish (sokn) within Meråker Municipality. It is part of the Stjørdal prosti (deanery) in the Diocese of Nidaros.

Churches in Meråker Municipality
Parish (sokn)	Church name	Location of the church	Year built
Meråker	Meråker Church	Midtbygda	1874
Meråker	Kopperå Chapel	Kopperå	1936
Meråker	Stordalen Chapel	Stordalsvollen	1863

== History ==
=== Meråker Smelter ===
In 1898, a carbide factory was opened at Kopperå, later this factor was rebuilt as a silicon smelter. The smelter was in operation until June 2006. Its main product was microsilica which is used as an additive to cement.

== Geography ==
Meråker is a landlocked municipality in the central part of Trøndelag county. To the north is Verdal Municipality, to the west is Stjørdal Municipality, to the south is Selbu Municipality and Tydal Municipality, and to the east is Åre Municipality in Sweden.

There are three major lakes in Meråker: Feren, Fjergen, and Funnsjøen. The river Stjørdalselva runs through the municipality towards the Trondheimsfjord. The river Rotla begins in the southern part of Meråker. The highest point in the municipality is the 1,441.36-metre (4,728.9 ft) tall mountain Fongen, a tripoint on the border of Meråker Municipality, Selbu Municipality, and Tydal Municipality.

== Government ==
Meråker Municipality is responsible for primary education (through 10th grade), outpatient health services, senior citizen services, welfare and other social services, zoning, economic development, and municipal roads and utilities. The municipality is governed by a municipal council of directly elected representatives. The mayor is indirectly elected by a vote of the municipal council. The municipality is under the jurisdiction of the Trøndelag District Court and the Frostating Court of Appeal. Waste management has since 1997 been provided by the intermunicipal agency Innherred Renovasjon, and waste collection has been operated by ReTrans Midt since 2018.

=== Municipal council ===
The municipal council (Kommunestyre) of Meråker Municipality is made up of 17 representatives that are elected to four year terms. The tables below show the current and historical composition of the council by political party.

Meråker kommunestyre 2023–2027
Party name (in Norwegian)	Number of representatives
Labour Party (Arbeiderpartiet)	4
Red Party (Rødt)	1
Centre Party (Senterpartiet)	5
Socialist Left Party (Sosialistisk Venstreparti)	1
Meråker Cross-Party Local List (Meråker Tverrpolitiske Bygdeliste)	6
Total number of members:	17

Meråker kommunestyre 2019–2023
Party name (in Norwegian)	Number of representatives
Labour Party (Arbeiderpartiet)	5
Progress Party (Fremskrittspartiet)	1
Centre Party (Senterpartiet)	7
Socialist Left Party (Sosialistisk Venstreparti)	2
Liberal Party (Venstre)	1
Meråker Cross-Party Local List (Meråker Tverrpolitiske Bygdeliste)	5
Total number of members:	21

Meråker kommunestyre 2015–2019
Party name (in Norwegian)	Number of representatives
Labour Party (Arbeiderpartiet)	6
Progress Party (Fremskrittspartiet)	1
Centre Party (Senterpartiet)	4
Socialist Left Party (Sosialistisk Venstreparti)	1
Liberal Party (Venstre)	3
Meråker Cross-Party Local List (Meråker Tverrpolitiske Bygdeliste)	6
Total number of members:	21

Meråker kommunestyre 2011–2015
Party name (in Norwegian)	Number of representatives
Labour Party (Arbeiderpartiet)	7
Progress Party (Fremskrittspartiet)	1
Conservative Party (Høyre)	2
Centre Party (Senterpartiet)	3
Socialist Left Party (Sosialistisk Venstreparti)	1
Liberal Party (Venstre)	4
Meråker Cross-Party Local List (Meråker Tverrpolitiske Bygdeliste)	3
Total number of members:	21

Meråker kommunestyre 2007–2011
Party name (in Norwegian)	Number of representatives
Labour Party (Arbeiderpartiet)	11
Progress Party (Fremskrittspartiet)	1
Conservative Party (Høyre)	1
Centre Party (Senterpartiet)	3
Socialist Left Party (Sosialistisk Venstreparti)	2
Liberal Party (Venstre)	1
Meråker cross-party local list (Meråker tverrpolitiske bygdeliste)	2
Total number of members:	21

Meråker kommunestyre 2003–2007
Party name (in Norwegian)	Number of representatives
Labour Party (Arbeiderpartiet)	10
Progress Party (Fremskrittspartiet)	1
Centre Party (Senterpartiet)	3
Socialist Left Party (Sosialistisk Venstreparti)	3
Liberal Party (Venstre)	2
Meråker Cross-party Local List (Meråker Tverrpolitiske Bygdeliste)	2
Total number of members:	21

Meråker kommunestyre 1999–2003
Party name (in Norwegian)	Number of representatives
Labour Party (Arbeiderpartiet)	10
Conservative Party (Høyre)	1
Centre Party (Senterpartiet)	4
Socialist Left Party (Sosialistisk Venstreparti)	1
Liberal Party (Venstre)	1
Meråker Cross-party local list (Meråker Tverrpolitisk bygdeliste)	4
Total number of members:	21

Meråker kommunestyre 1995–1999
Party name (in Norwegian)	Number of representatives
Labour Party (Arbeiderpartiet)	10
Conservative Party (Høyre)	1
Centre Party (Senterpartiet)	3
Socialist Left Party (Sosialistisk Venstreparti)	1
Liberal Party (Venstre)	2
Meråker Cross-party local list (Meråker Tverrpolitiske bygdeliste)	4
Total number of members:	21

Meråker kommunestyre 1991–1995
Party name (in Norwegian)	Number of representatives
Labour Party (Arbeiderpartiet)	11
Conservative Party (Høyre)	1
Centre Party (Senterpartiet)	3
Socialist Left Party (Sosialistisk Venstreparti)	2
Liberal Party (Venstre)	4
Total number of members:	21

Meråker kommunestyre 1987–1991
Party name (in Norwegian)	Number of representatives
Labour Party (Arbeiderpartiet)	11
Conservative Party (Høyre)	1
Centre Party (Senterpartiet)	3
Socialist Left Party (Sosialistisk Venstreparti)	1
Liberal Party (Venstre)	5
Total number of members:	21

Meråker kommunestyre 1983–1987
Party name (in Norwegian)	Number of representatives
Labour Party (Arbeiderpartiet)	12
Conservative Party (Høyre)	2
Centre Party (Senterpartiet)	2
Socialist Left Party (Sosialistisk Venstreparti)	1
Liberal Party (Venstre)	4
Total number of members:	21

Meråker kommunestyre 1979–1983
Party name (in Norwegian)	Number of representatives
Labour Party (Arbeiderpartiet)	11
Centre Party (Senterpartiet)	1
Socialist Left Party (Sosialistisk Venstreparti)	1
Liberal Party (Venstre)	6
Joint list of the New People's Party and independent voters (Det Nye Folkepartiet og uavhengige velgere)	1
Joint list of the Conservative Party (Høyre) and Christian Democratic Party (Kristelig Folkeparti)	1
Total number of members:	21

Meråker kommunestyre 1975–1979
Party name (in Norwegian)	Number of representatives
Labour Party (Arbeiderpartiet)	11
Socialist Left Party (Sosialistisk Venstreparti)	3
Liberal Party (Venstre)	4
Joint list of the Conservative Party (Høyre), Christian Democratic Party (Kristelig Folkeparti), and Centre Party (Senterpartiet)	3
Total number of members:	21

Meråker kommunestyre 1971–1975
Party name (in Norwegian)	Number of representatives
Labour Party (Arbeiderpartiet)	13
Centre Party (Senterpartiet)	2
Socialist People's Party (Sosialistisk Folkeparti)	2
Liberal Party (Venstre)	2
Local List(s) (Lokale lister)	2
Total number of members:	21

Meråker kommunestyre 1967–1971
Party name (in Norwegian)	Number of representatives
Labour Party (Arbeiderpartiet)	13
Conservative Party (Høyre)	1
Centre Party (Senterpartiet)	1
Socialist People's Party (Sosialistisk Folkeparti)	3
Liberal Party (Venstre)	3
Total number of members:	21

Meråker kommunestyre 1963–1967
Party name (in Norwegian)	Number of representatives
Labour Party (Arbeiderpartiet)	15
Communist Party (Kommunistiske Parti)	1
Liberal Party (Venstre)	2
Joint List(s) of Non-Socialist Parties (Borgerlige Felleslister)	3
Total number of members:	21

Meråker herredsstyre 1959–1963
Party name (in Norwegian)	Number of representatives
Labour Party (Arbeiderpartiet)	13
Communist Party (Kommunistiske Parti)	2
Liberal Party (Venstre)	3
Joint List(s) of Non-Socialist Parties (Borgerlige Felleslister)	3
Total number of members:	21

Meråker herredsstyre 1955–1959
Party name (in Norwegian)	Number of representatives
Labour Party (Arbeiderpartiet)	13
Communist Party (Kommunistiske Parti)	3
Joint List(s) of Non-Socialist Parties (Borgerlige Felleslister)	5
Total number of members:	21

Meråker herredsstyre 1951–1955
Party name (in Norwegian)	Number of representatives
Labour Party (Arbeiderpartiet)	11
Communist Party (Kommunistiske Parti)	4
Joint List(s) of Non-Socialist Parties (Borgerlige Felleslister)	5
Total number of members:	20

Meråker herredsstyre 1947–1951
Party name (in Norwegian)	Number of representatives
Labour Party (Arbeiderpartiet)	11
Communist Party (Kommunistiske Parti)	5
Liberal Party (Venstre)	4
Total number of members:	20

Meråker herredsstyre 1945–1947
Party name (in Norwegian)	Number of representatives
Labour Party (Arbeiderpartiet)	11
Communist Party (Kommunistiske Parti)	6
Joint List(s) of Non-Socialist Parties (Borgerlige Felleslister)	3
Total number of members:	20

Meråker herredsstyre 1937–1941*
Party name (in Norwegian)	Number of representatives
Labour Party (Arbeiderpartiet)	12
Communist Party (Kommunistiske Parti)	4
Joint List(s) of Non-Socialist Parties (Borgerlige Felleslister)	5
Total number of members:	20
Note: Due to the German occupation of Norway during World War II, no elections were held for new municipal councils until after the war ended in 1945.

=== Mayors ===
The mayor (Norwegian: ordfører) of Meråker Municipality is the political leader of the municipality and the chairperson of the municipal council. Here is a list of people who have held this position:

- 1874–1877: Christian Erlandsen
- 1878–1885: John Johnsen
- 1886–1887: Iver Lie
- 1888–1893: Fredrik Rø (V)
- 1894–1897: O. Hugdahl
- 1898–1907: Fredrik Rø (V)
- 1908–1910: Carl Olaf Iversen (H)
- 1911–1913: Olav Stubban (Ap)
- 1914–1916: Ole E. Wollan (Ap)
- 1917–1922: Peder J. Myrmo (Ap)
- 1923–1925: Arne Bergsaas (Ap)
- 1926–1937: Kristian Rothaug (Ap)
- 1938–1939: Joar Eimhjellen (Ap)
- 1939–1941: Alf Karlsen (Ap)
- 1942–1942: Arild Solberg (NS)
- 1943–1945: Alf Hembre (NS)
- 1945–1966: Alf Karlsen (Ap)
- 1967–1973: Johnny Stenberg (Ap)
- 1973–1995: Svein Brækken (Ap)
- 1995–2015: Bård Langsåvold (Ap)
- 2015–2019: Kari Anita Furunes (Sp)
- 2019–2023: Kjersti Kjenes (LL)
- 2023–present: Kari Anita Furunes (Sp)

== Transportation ==
The European route E14 highway runs east to west through the municipality connecting to Trondheim Airport, Værnes about 40 kilometres (25 mi) to the west. The Meråker Line railway follows the E14 through the municipality also, with stops at Kopperå Station, Meråker Station, and Gudå Station.

== Media ==
The newspaper Meråkerposten has been published in Meråker since 1982.

== Notable people ==
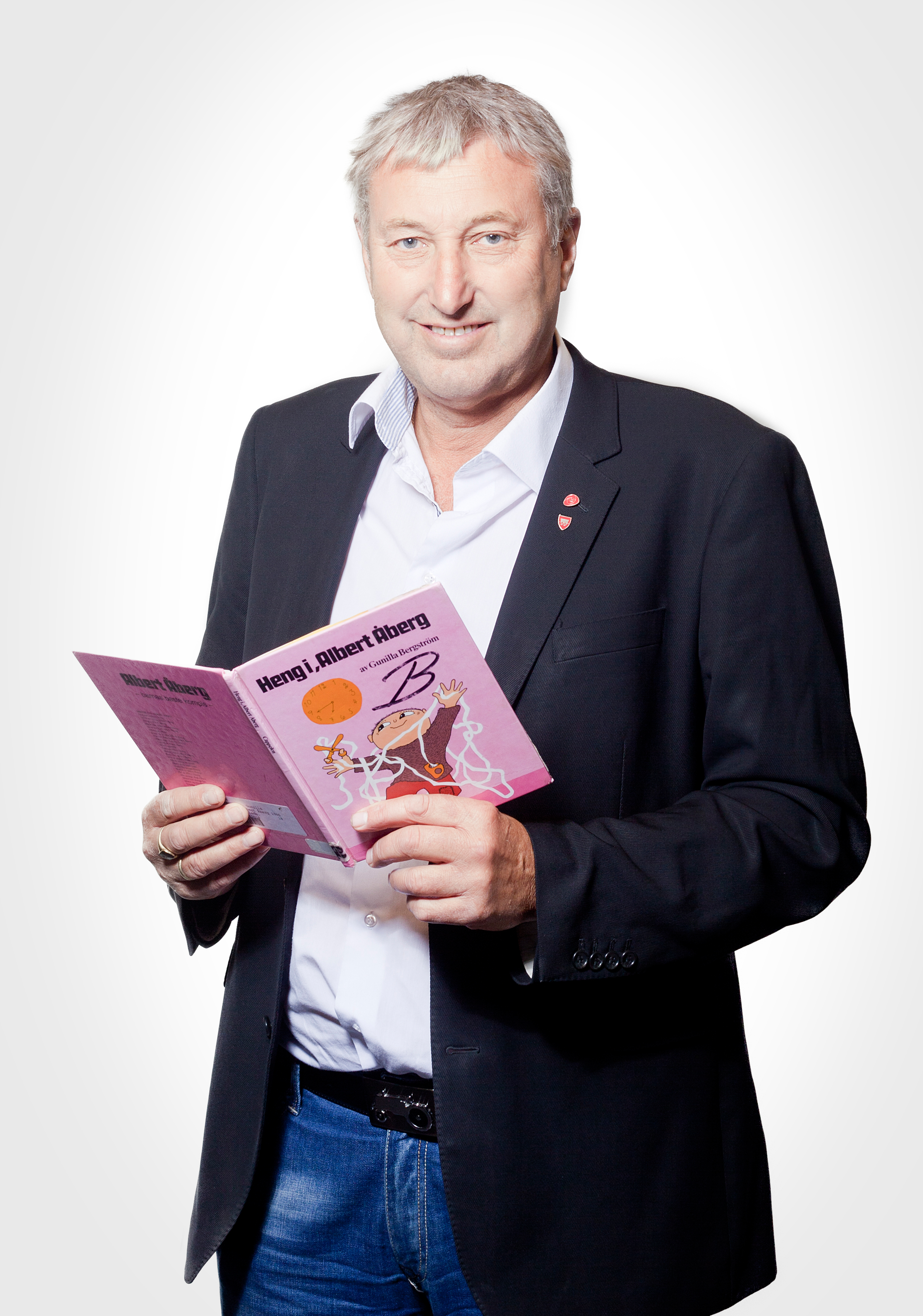
Bård Langsåvold, 2013

- Anton Johnson Fridrichsen (1888 in Meråker – 1953), a Swedish theologian
- Helge Ingstad (1899 in Meråker - 2001), an author, explorer, and archeologist
- Arne Braa Saatvedt (1922 in Meråker – 1945), a Norwegian police official and member of the Nasjonal Samling; executed in 1945
- Bård Langsåvold (born 1952), a Norwegian politician and Mayor of Meråker from 1995 to 2015
- Dag Lyseid (1954–2012), a footballer and politician and deputy Mayor of Meråker from 1999 to 2008
- Vebjørn Selbekk (born 1969), a newspaper editor and author who was brought up in Meråker

=== Sport ===
- Magnar Lundemo (1938 in Meråker - 1987), a cross country skier and track and field athlete who competed at the 1960 and 1964 Winter Olympics
- Frode Estil (born 1972), a retired cross country skier who lives in Meråker
- Kine Beate Bjørnås (born 1980), a retired cross country skier
- Simen Raaen Sandmæl (born 1990 in Meråker), a Norwegian footballer with over 130 club caps

== Media gallery ==
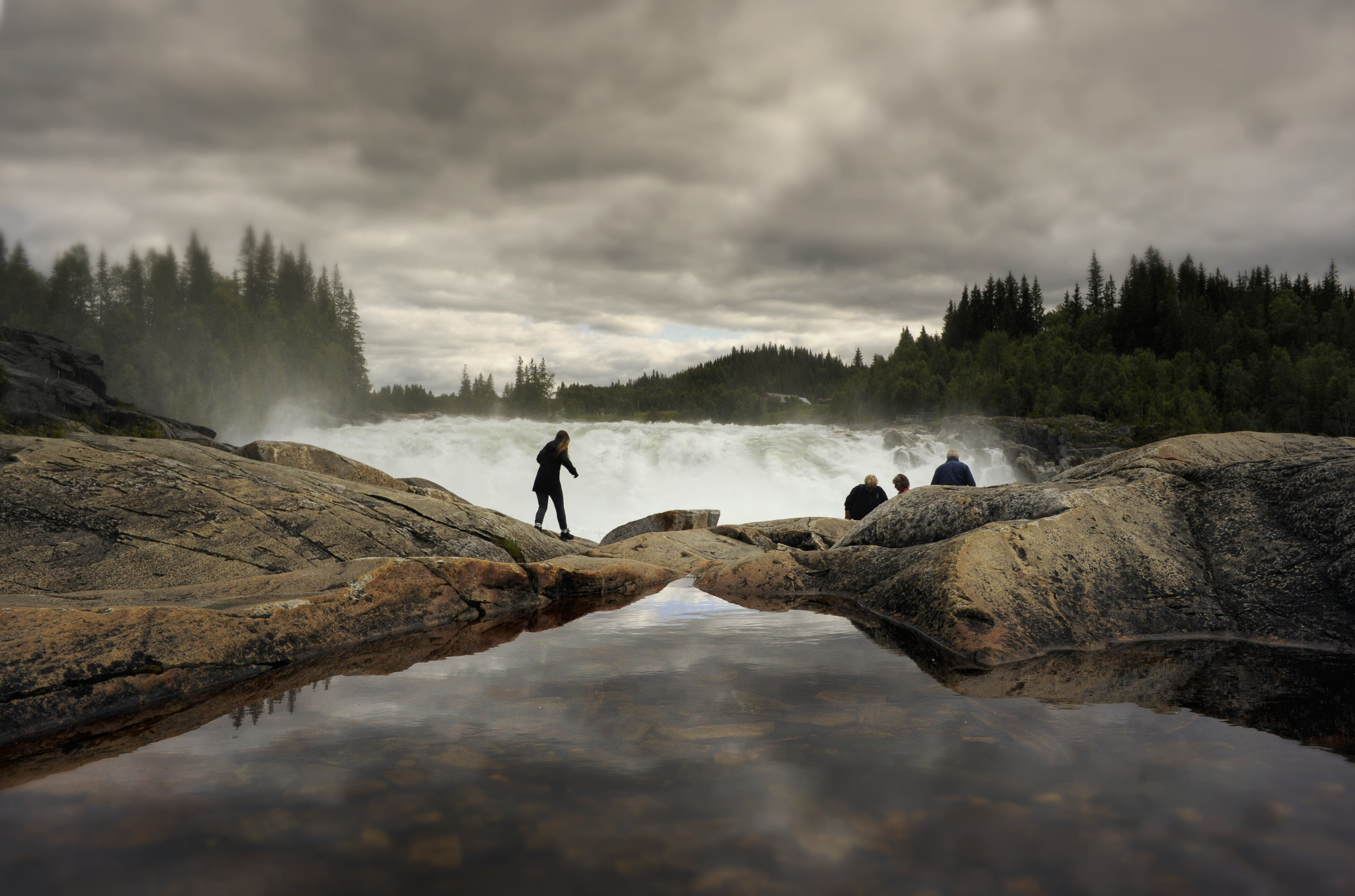
Meråker, Norway

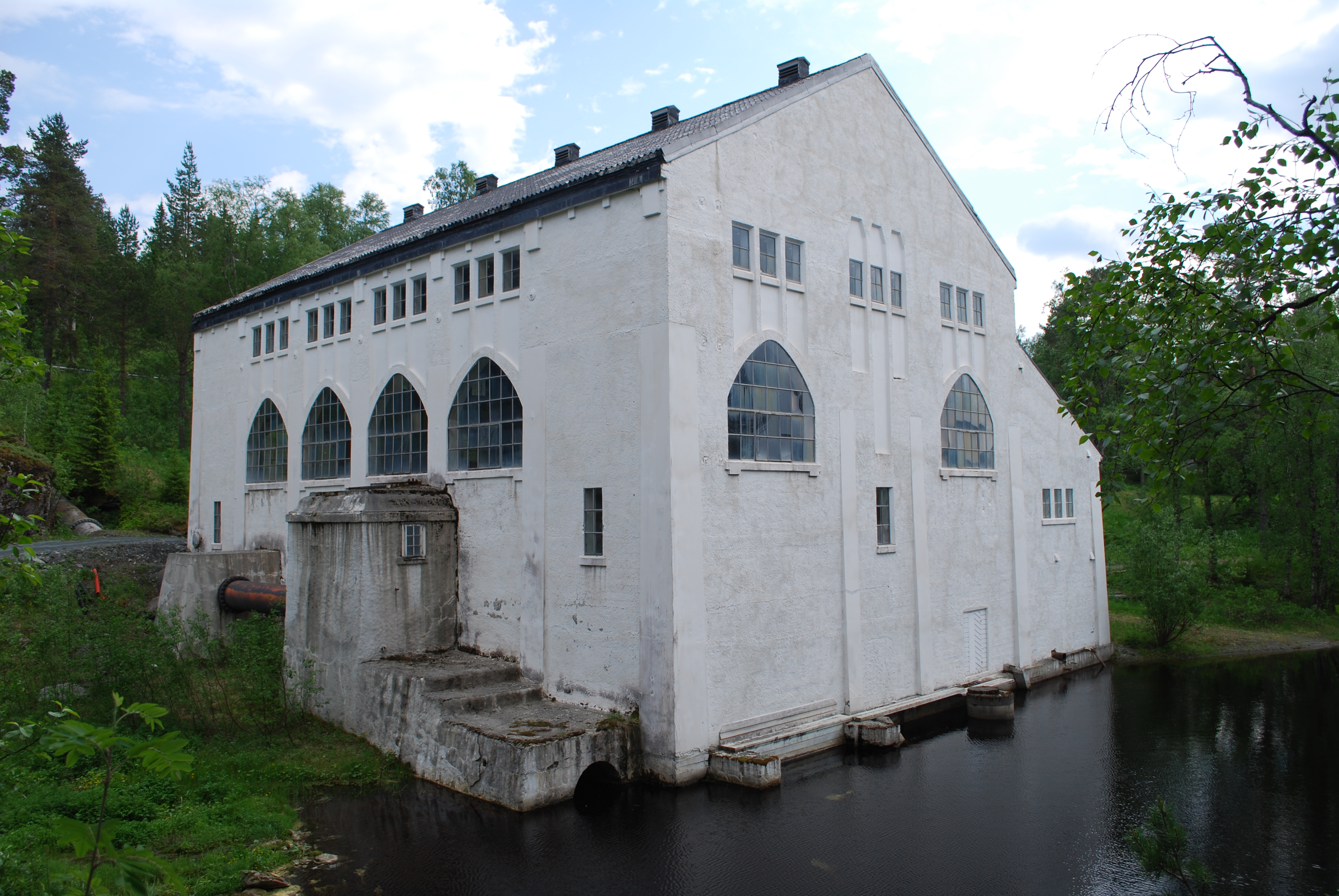
Meråker smelteverk Kopperå

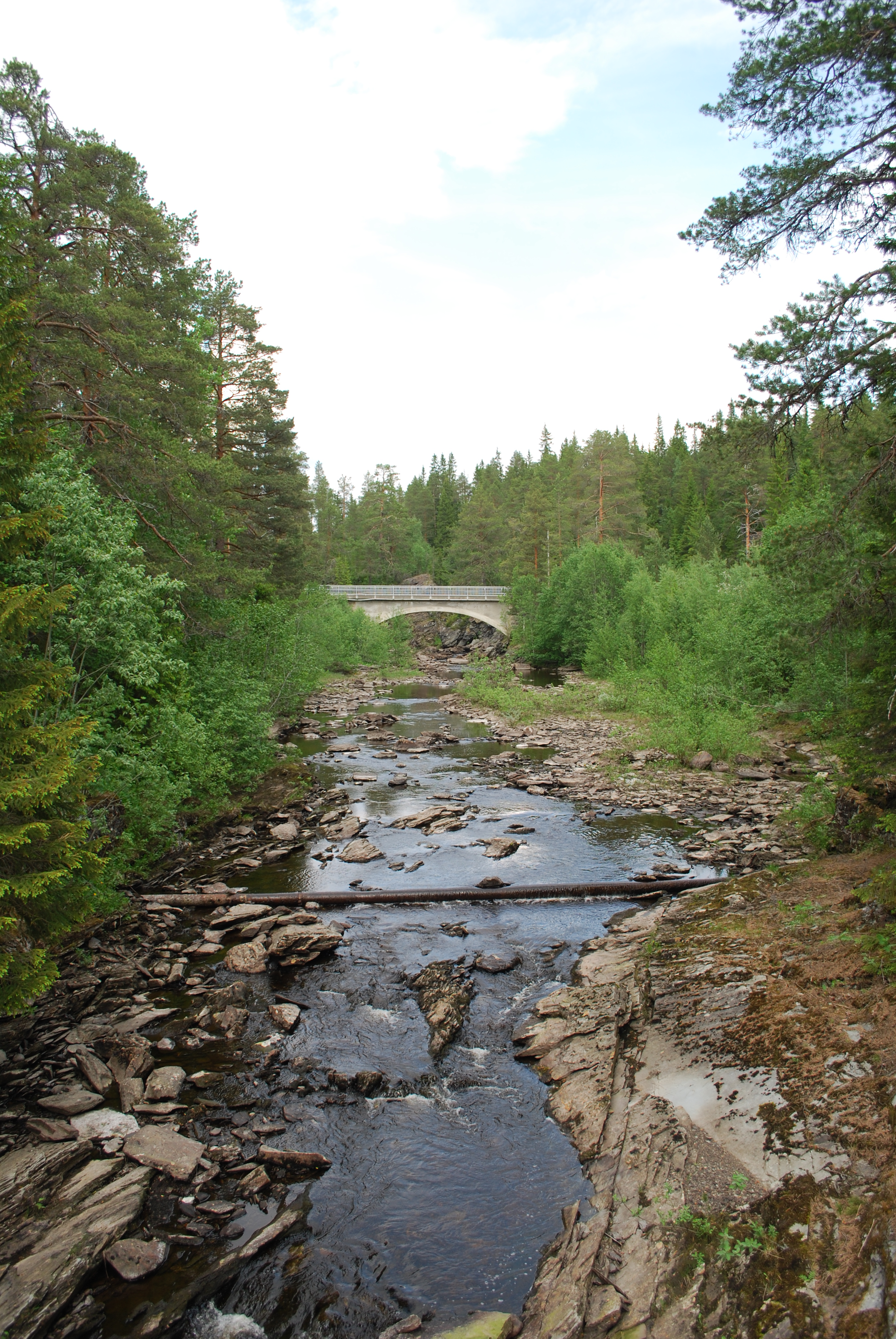
Elven Kopperåa i Kopperå, Meråker

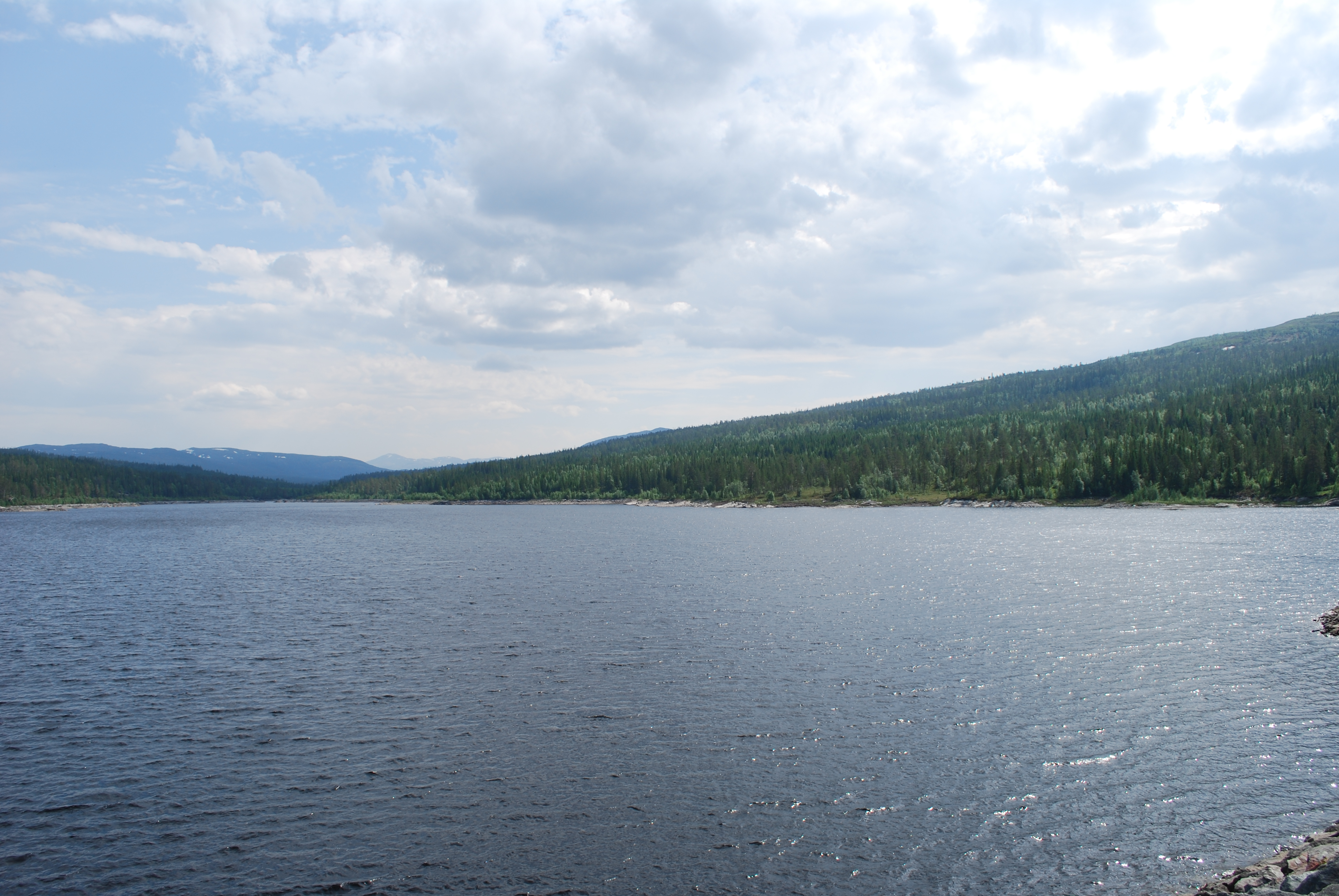
Grønbergdammen in Meråker
