= Nordstern (city) =

Planned Nazi city in German-occupied Norway

Coordinates: 63°19′52″N 10°14′07″E

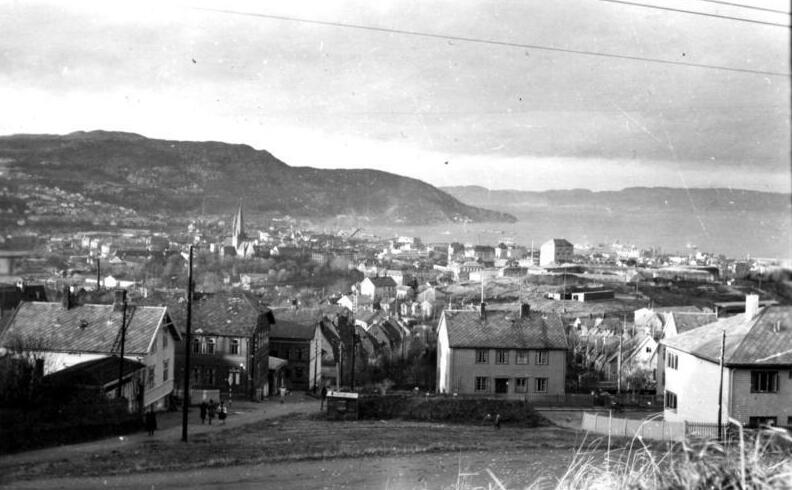
German archival photo of Trondheim and Trondheim Fjord, November 1942

Nordstern (English: North Star), usually referred to as Neu Drontheim (Note: Drontheim is the traditional German form of the Norwegian Trondheim, Neu Drontheim was the name given to the new planned German city and is referred to in this way in German occupation documents. A number of historians mistakenly referring to the plans as the reconstruction of Trondheim itself rather than the creation of a new, separate city. Joseph Goebbels identified its designated name as Nordstern in his diary entry of 9 July 1941, as directly told to him by Hitler. For a discussion of the name as well as the project as a whole, see Despina Stratigakos, Hitler's Northern Utopia: Building the New Order in Occupied Norway (Princeton: Princetone University Press, 2020), chapter 5.) (lit. 'New Trondheim'), was a Nazi plan for the creation of a new metropolis located in German-occupied Norway. It was planned to be built in Øysand, 15 km (9.3 mi) southwest of the city of Trondheim, and have a population of around 250,000 to 300,000 German inhabitants. It was intended to be administered directly from Germany.

Nordstern's construction would be in conjunction with a major Kriegsmarine base due to the significant strategic importance of Trondheim Fjord to the German military. The new city and base would give Germany unprecedented maritime control over the North Atlantic area, a move strongly supported by Großadmirals Erich Raeder and Karl Dönitz. German leader Adolf Hitler envisioned the city as "a German Singapore", and it became one of his favorite architectural projects.

== Strategic importance ==
The conquest of Norway by the Wehrmacht presented the military leadership of the Nazi Germany with new opportunities for expansion. The city of Trondheim and its accompanying bay were determined to be very favorably located strategically for several reasons. Prior to the outbreak of war, the retired Vizeadmiral and naval strategist Wolfgang Wegener had already long stressed the strategic benefits that acquiring bases along the Norwegian coastline would give Germany.

One notable example of these benefits is the case of the battleship Tirpitz, which had to be continually moved back to Germany for any additional repairs that she required. Due to her sheer size, there were simply no other docks in the north large enough to accommodate her. After the failure of the Luftwaffe to subdue Great Britain in the Battle of Britain by airpower alone, it was recognized that the fight for the British Isles would have to be fought and won at sea. Furthermore, it would be of major importance if the Kriegsmarine were to pursue any farther-reaching operations in the Atlantic in the near future, for instance if the United States were to engage in war with it. These and other motivations—such as Swedish iron ore shipments from Narvik—led the Oberkommando der Wehrmacht (Armed Forces High Command; OKW) to classify the possession of Norway in general and Trondheim in particular as strategically vital to the German war effort. Trondheim was later turned into a major base for German U-boat submarines, Dora I.

== History ==
Preparatory work on the possibility of turning the bay around Trondheim into a new German naval base was already started at the Führer Headquarters before the project was officially commissioned by Hitler in 1941. As a permanent German possession, it was acknowledged that some arrangements would have to be made for its resident seamen and their accompanying families. Hitler concluded that this new harbor would make the construction of an accompanying city inevitable, with living accommodations for 250,000 inhabitants. He dubbed the new settlement Nordstern ("Northern Star").

To organize and carry out the necessary planning for the new project, Hitler appointed Albert Speer, at the time his favorite architect and later Minister of Armaments in his Cabinet. On 1 May 1941, Speer received the necessary information on the spatial and structural requirements for a large shipyard from Vizeadmiral Werner Fuchs of the Oberkommando der Marine (Naval High Command; OKM). He reported to Hitler on the project at the Reich Chancellery in Berlin, accompanied by Großadmiral Erich Raeder on 21 June. During this meeting, Hitler determined the precise building site for the city, while also deciding that a large, sub-surface submarine base was to be blasted into the granite cliffs. He further discussed the future city and its military base during an armaments conference on 13 May 1942.

In 1943, the first ground detonations were begun. To provide the construction site with labor, a prisoner-of-war camp was built in Øysand. A reserve landing strip for airplanes was also put in place. Special maps were prepared for Hitler from which he studied the optimum positions for the docks and accompanying structures. A highly detailed miniature model that was several meters wide was also built for him, which was destroyed during an Allied bombardment in Berlin in 1945.

=== Abandonment of the project ===
After the course of the war turned against Germany, construction was eventually stopped and put on indefinite hold. After the destruction of the Tirpitz in November 1944, most of the naval leadership was sacked and the plan abandoned permanently.

The few existing remains of the concrete foundations can still be seen on the shores of Trondheim Fjord.

== Location, size, and plans ==
It was decided that the city was to be built in the wetlands of Øysand, 15–20 km (9.3–12.4 mi) to the southwest of Trondheim. It was supposed to provide living quarters for about 300,000 German inhabitants (more than three times the size of 1940s Trondheim), and for this purpose 55,000 residential houses were to be built on an area of approximately 300 hectares (1.2 mi^{2}). The city was also to house an enormous art museum for the northern part of Germany's empire, containing "only works of German masters". The city was also meant to house a monumental war cemetery and monument, which would hold the remains of thirty-one hundred German war dead. An Autobahn was to be constructed to Trondheim across the Little and Great Belts of Denmark and further through southwest Sweden and Norway to connect the northern outpost with Germany proper.

The naval base itself was planned to contain extensive shipyards, docks and U-boat bases for the expected post-war German navy that was to consist altogether of several hundred submarines and dozens of super-battleships, as well as several aircraft carriers. It would, in Hitler's words, render the British Empire hold on Singapore as "mere child′s play" by comparison as a military stronghold.

== Atlantic Wall ==
As one of Germany's most important naval bases in the anticipated near future, the city played an important role in German schemes for a massively enlarged version of the Atlantic Wall.

During the Nuremberg Trials, it was admitted that Hitler intended to retain not only Trondheim, but also numerous other maritime cities such as Brest and Cherbourg in France as German exclaves (Festungen, i.e. "strongholds") for the Third Reich, similar to the Soviet military base temporarily established in the Finnish town of Hanko after the Winter War. Nordstern would therefore be one among many military quasi-colonies with almost exclusively German inhabitants.

Together with other cities and island chains in both Europe and Africa, it was to form part of a string of German military bases that would span the entire Atlantic coastline from Norway all the way to the Belgian Congo. This was to assist Germany with the re-establishment of a large overseas colonial domain in Central Africa known as Mittelafrika, and was also intended for both offensive and defensive operations against the Western Hemisphere, specifically the United States.

== See also ==
- Welthauptstadt Germania
- Nazi architecture
- Atlantic Wall
- Plan Z
- Festung Norwegen
- Occupation of Norway by Nazi Germany
- Reichskommissariat Norwegen
- Despina Stratigakos, Hitler’s Northern Utopia: Building the New Order in Occupied Norway (Princeton: Princeton University Press, 2020)
