= Øysand =

Village in Melhus Municipality, Norway

Øysand Øysanden
- Village
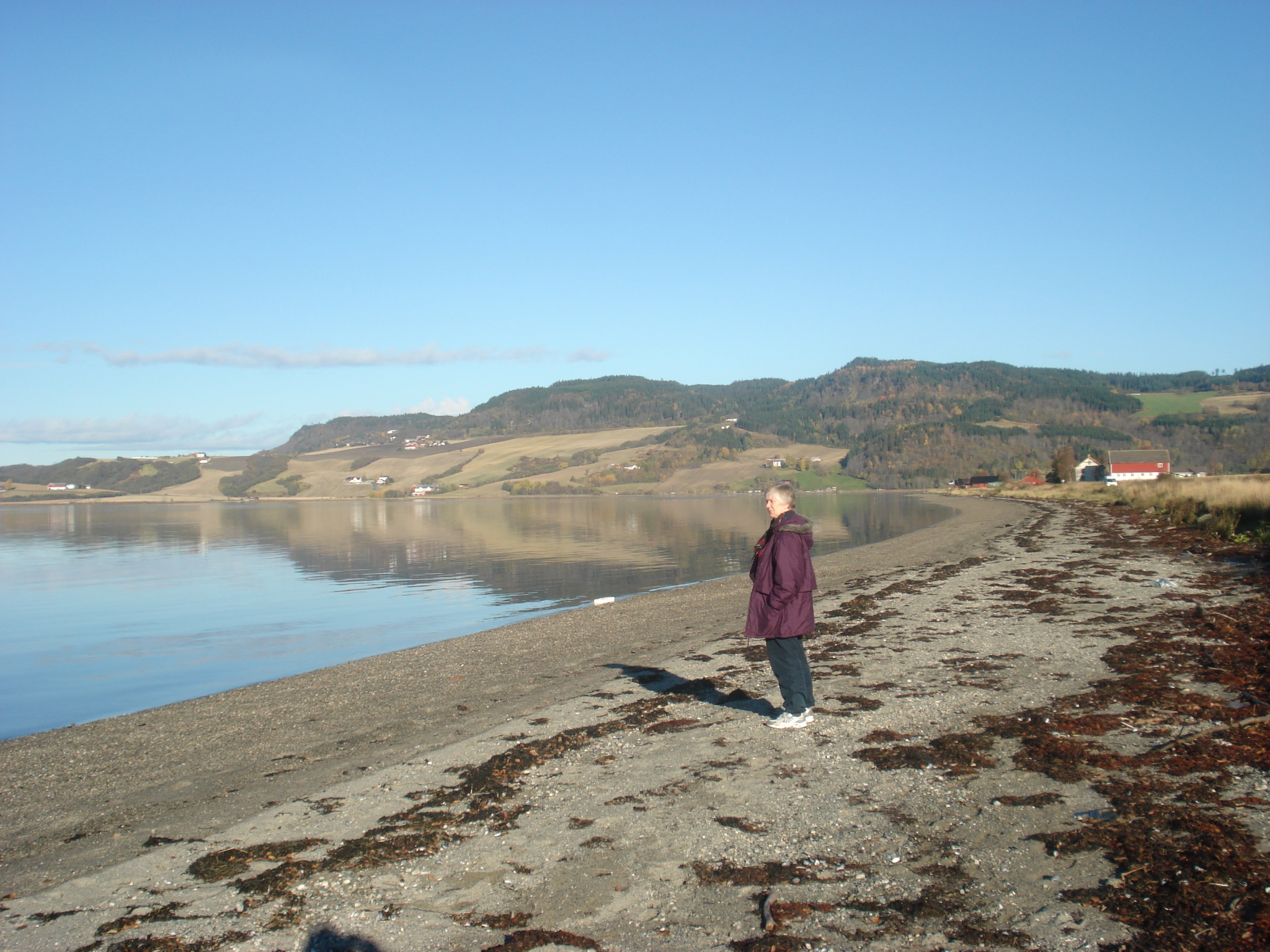
- Øysand, with Byneset on the other side of Gaulosen, a branch of Trondheim Fjord
- Interactive map of Øysand
- Location within Trøndelag Location within Norway
- Coordinates: 63.3312°N 10.2156°E
- Country: Norway
- Region: Central Norway
- County: Trøndelag
- District: Gauldalen
- Municipality: Melhus Municipality
- Elevation: 4 m (13 ft)
- Time zone: UTC+01:00 (CET)
  - Summer (DST): UTC+02:00 (CEST)
- Post Code: 7224 Melhus

Øysand or Øysanden is a small village area in the northern part of Melhus Municipality in Trøndelag county, Norway. The village sits on the south side of the mouth of the Gaula River, at the head of the Gaulosen, an arm off the main Trondheim Fjord.

== Geography ==
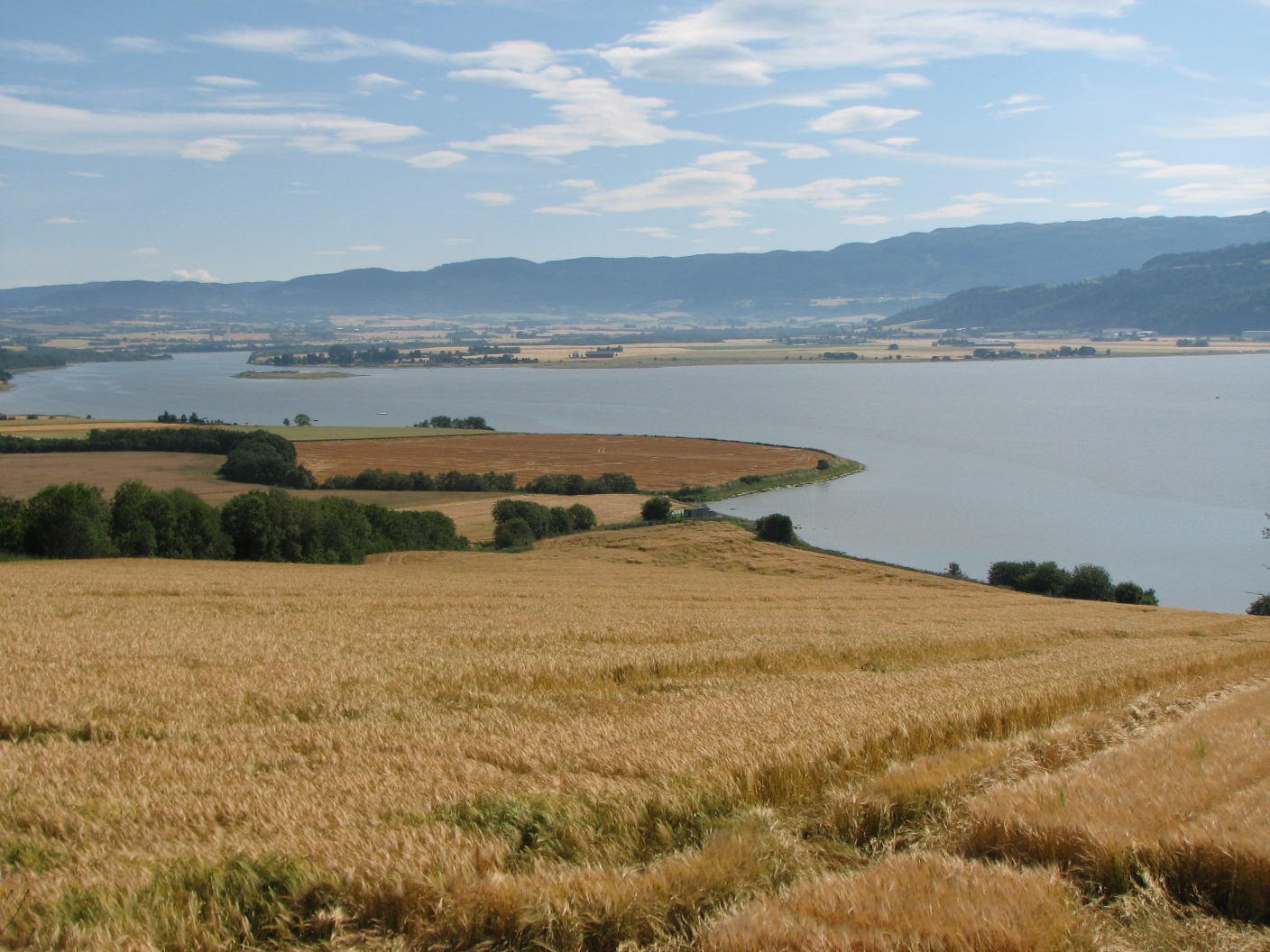
Gaulosen, a branch of Trondheim Fjord, with Øysand in the background. Photo taken from Byneset.

The Øysand area measures about 3 square kilometers (1.2 sq mi). The Gaula River borders Øysanden to the north and east, separating it from Trondheim Municipality to the northeast. To the west there is a shallow sandy beach on the shore of Gaulosen, a branch of Trondheim Fjord. To the south, the section of European route E39 from Klett to Orkanger crosses the area. Øysanden is a flat plain and most of the land is used for growing grain. There is also some industry there and a campground along the beach. The best-known native of the area is the musician, composer, and actor Ivar Gafseth, who is known from the television series The Julekalender and the Trøndelag Theater.

== Name ==
The name of the area was originally simply Øy which means 'island'. More recently, the name has been spelled Øysand, which is commonly used, but Øysandan and Øysandan are also seen, but these forms are hardly ever used in speech. The dative form of Øysand in the local dialect is på Øysaɲɲa. The Norwegian Mapping and Cadastre Authority has sought to standardize the spelling of the beach area as Øysand and the village area as Øysanden.

== Nordstern ==
During the Second World War, the Germans developed plans to create a new German metropolis in Øysand called Nordstern.
