= Uttrøndelag =

District in Trøndelag, Norway

Uttrøndelag is a sub-region consisting of the southern part of the county of Trøndelag, Norway. Administratively, the term was often used to describe the parts of the former county of Sør-Trøndelag excluding Trondheim. In this definition it gave name to for instance Uttrøndelag Police District (1910–2001).

== Definition ==
When used in the context of government bodies, Uttrøndelag has been used for the former parts of Sør-Trøndelag, when Trondheim needed to be excluded. However, the term lacks a precise definition, and was also sometimes used as a synonym for Sør-Trøndelag, or the coastal parts of Sør-Trøndelag. It had a counter-part in Inntrøndelag, which was north of Trondheim along the Trondheimsfjord.

Historically, the ancient Frostating area was subdivided into two sub-areas: Inntrøndelag, with its seat at Mære, and Uttrøndelag, with its head seat at Øra (today Trondheim). Uttrøndelag therefore consisted of four sub-counties: Stiordælafylki (Stjørdalen), Strindafylke (Trondheim and surroundings), Gauldølafylke (Gauldal) and Orkdølafylke (Orkdalen). The border between Inntrøndelag and Uttrøndelag therefor went through Frosta and Åsen, with those areas as well as the contemporary Stjørdalen belonging to Uttrøndelag.

== Linguistics ==
The Trøndersk dialect of the Norwegian language is classified with two major grousp: Inntrøndersk and Uttrøndersk. Inntrøndersk follows the interior from Oppdal Municipality to Røyrvik Municipality, while Uttrøndersk is spoken along the coast. The linguistic categorization gives a different geographic area than most geographic definitions.
