= RenoNorden =

Norwegian waste collection company

RenoNorden ASA
- Type: Allmennaksjeselskap
- Industry: Waste collection
- Founded: 2000
- Headquarters: Frogner, Norway,
- Area served: Norway; Denmark; Sweden; Finland
- Website: www.renonorden.com

RenoNorden is a Norwegian multinational waste collection company headquartered in Frogner, Norway.

The company was founded by Svein Morten Sørensen in 2000.

In 2011, the private equity firm Norvester sold RenoNorden to CapVest Limited and Accent Equity. CapVest and Accent Equity listed the company on the Oslo Stock Exchange in December 2014.

RenoNorden AS and RenoNorden ASA filed for bankruptcy on September 18, 2017.
