= Midtbygda, Trøndelag =

Village in Meråker Municipality, Norway

Midtbygda Meråker
- Village
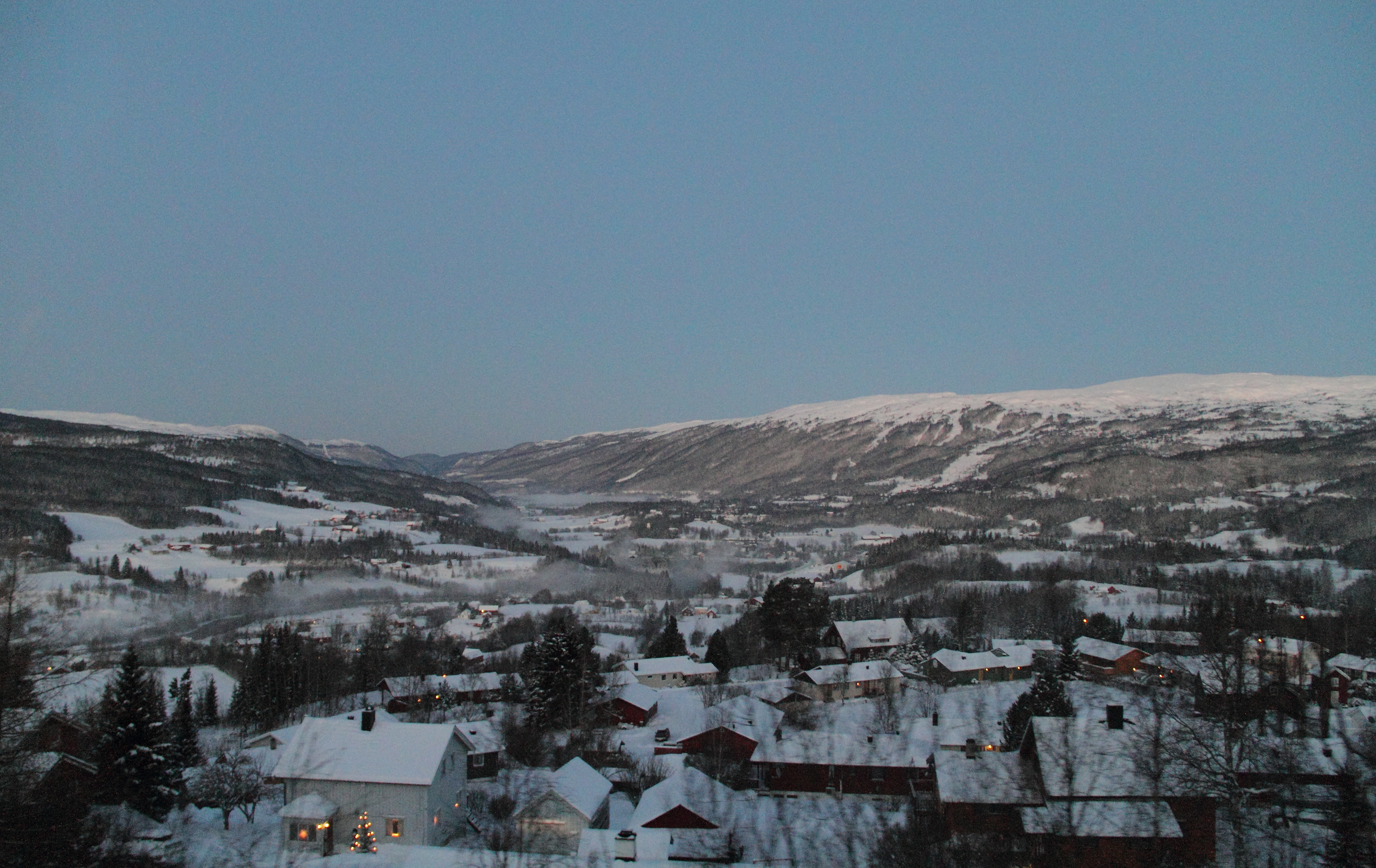
- View of the village
- Interactive map of Midtbygda; Meråker
- Location within Trøndelag Location within Norway
- Coordinates: 63.4141°N 11.7430°E
- Country: Norway
- Region: Central Norway
- County: Trøndelag
- District: Stjørdalen
- Municipality: Meråker Municipality

Area
  - Total: 1.44 km^{2} (0.56 sq mi)
- Elevation: 120 m (390 ft)

Population (2024)
  - Total: 1,041
  - Density: 723/km^{2} (1,870/sq mi)
- Time zone: UTC+01:00 (CET)
  - Summer (DST): UTC+02:00 (CEST)
- Post Code: 7530 Meråker

Midtbygda or Meråker is the administrative centre of Meråker Municipality in Trøndelag county, Norway. Midtbygda is located along the Stjørdalselva river and the European route E14 highway. It is served by Meråker Station, which is a railway station located along the Meråker Line. The local Meråker Church lies about 2 kilometres (1.2 mi) west of the village of Midtbygda. The lake Funnsjøen lies about 6 kilometres (3.7 mi) to the north.

The 1.44-square-kilometre (360-acre) village has a population (2024) of 1,041 and a population density of 723 inhabitants per square kilometre (1,870/sq mi).
