= Kommunalt foretak =

Type of municipally owned corporation in Norway

A kommunalt foretak or KF (English: "municipal enterprise") is a Norwegian company type. Specifically the term relates to an undertaking owned by a municipality. An equivalent enterprise owned by a county is known as a fylkeskommunalt foretak or FKF ("county enterprise"). Each KF and FKF has its own separate board of directors and a managing director, but the undertakings are not limited liability companies. Municipalities and counties are also permitted to own limited companies.

If more than one municipality and/or county is the owner, the company is instead classed as an Interkommunalt selskap or IKS (in English: Intermunicipal company). It resembles very closely a Municipal Enterprise (Kommunalt foretak) or County Enterprise, but the IKS requires multiple municipalities and/or counties to be owners. The organization is regulated by the Municipal Act. Typical activities organised as IKS's include waterworks, archives, museums and garbage disposal.

== See also ==
- Local federation, a similar organization in Sweden
