= Carolean Death March =

Swedish retreat in the Great Northern War

Armfeldt's campaign in Trøndelag, 1718–1719. The dates are according to the Julian calendar.

The Carolean Death March (Swedish: karolinernas dödsmarsch), also known as the Catastrophe on Øyfjellet (Swedish: katastrofen på Öjfjället) was the disastrous retreat by a force of Swedish soldiers (known as Caroleans), under the command of Carl Gustaf Armfeldt, across the Tydalen mountain range in Trøndelag, Norway, around the new year 1718–1719.

== Background ==
In 1718, after several defeats in the Great Northern War, Sweden had lost its eastern territories to Russia. Too weakened to retake these, Charles XII of Sweden instead planned an attack on Norway to force the Dano-Norwegian King Frederick IV into great concessions in subsequent peace treaty negotiations.

After the Swedish defeat at the Battle of Napue on 2 March 1714 N.S. (19 February 1714 O.S.), Swedish Lieutenant-general Carl Gustaf Armfeldt had retreated to the area of Gävle with the mauled army of Finland. He was now ordered to make a diversionary attack from Jämtland towards Trondheim in Trøndelag with his poorly equipped soldiers.

== Armfeldt's campaign to Trondheim ==
After assembling a host of 10,000 soldiers in Duved, he set off towards Norway on 29 August [O.S. 18 August] 1718. Four months later, the campaign in Trøndelag had failed: the defenders of Trondheim had successfully held off Armfeldt. The army of 10,000 had dwindled to around 6,000, and the surviving soldiers were exhausted and starved, their clothing tattered and threadbare. Bad weather made resupplies from Sweden impossible, so the army had to live off the land, causing untold suffering to the Norwegian civilian population.

== Departure to Sweden ==
After Charles' death on 11 December 1718 N.S. (30 November O.S.) during the siege of Fredriksten, all Swedish forces in Norway were ordered to retreat back to Sweden. Armfeldt received notice of Charles' death on 7 January 1719 N.S. (27 December 1718 O.S.), when his force was in Haltdalen, Gauldal with about 6,000 men. He decided to take the shortest route to Sweden: first over the mountains to Tydalen and from there over the Tydal mountain range back to the fort of Hjerpe. So far the winter had been mild with scant to no snow cover. Skis were therefore not needed, but the army was poorly equipped and exhausted from the campaigning in Trøndelag.

On 8 January 1719 N.S. (28 December 1718 O.S.), the army left Haltdalen and marched to Tydalen, a distance of almost 30 kilometres (19 mi). Due to the cold weather, about 200 men died on the mountains from exposure. On 11 January 1719 N.S. (31 December 1718 O.S.), Armfeldt's army was gathered on the Ås and Østby farms in Tydalen, almost 5,800 men in total. A vanguard of 14 skiers was sent across to Jämtland to prepare for the main army's arrival in Sweden.

The army left Østby on the morning of 12 January 1719 N.S. (1 January O.S.), accompanied by Norwegian guide Lars Bersvendsen Østby, who had been coerced into aiding the enemy by having two kinswomen held hostage. The weather was very cold, but there was no snowfall. The distance to the village of Handöl in present-day Åre Municipality is about 55 kilometres (34 mi). Without the inclement weather the army could have reached Jämtland after a two-day march.

== Storm ==
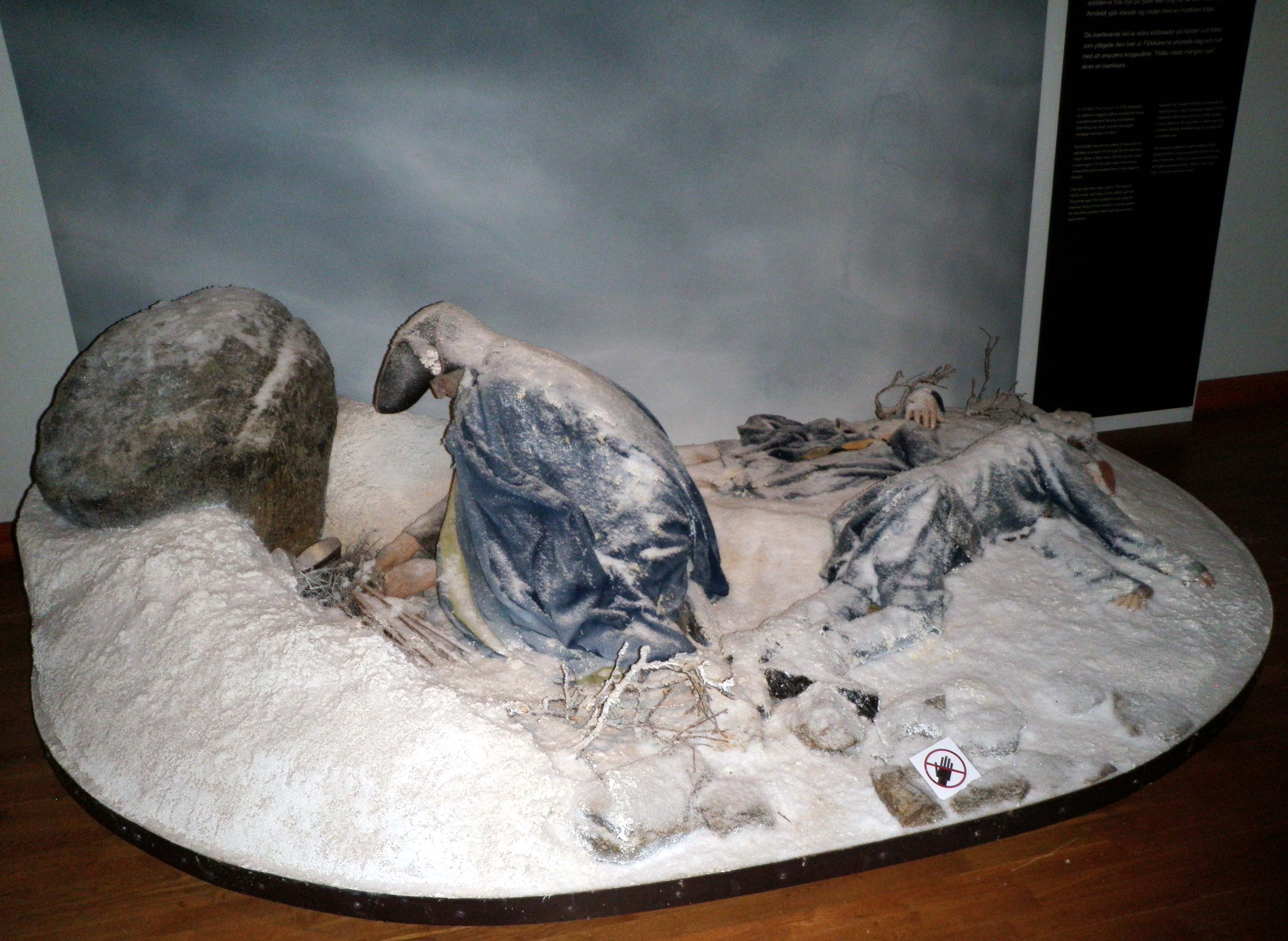
Exhibition illustrating the conditions of the Carolean Death March, at the Swedish Army Museum in Stockholm, Sweden

That afternoon a violent northwesterly blizzard struck, with its strong wind swirling up the light snow. The resulting poor visibility and biting cold forced Armfeldt to encamp on the northern mountainside of Øyfjellet by the lake Essand. In desperate efforts to keep warm, the soldiers set fire to dwarf birch, heather, their own musket butts and sleds, but to little effect. An estimated 200 men froze to death this first night.

The storm continued the next day, and the retreat now became chaotic as the soldiers were scattered in the hills. The main part of the force reached the Swedish border and encamped at Enaälven. A hole was hacked in the ice on the Ena to see in which direction the water flowed: in that direction lay rescue. However, the severe weather continued to take its toll; many of the draught horses died and all equipment had to be abandoned on the mountain. The storm was still raging on 14 January N.S. (3 January O.S.) as the first troops led by Armfeldt made their way to Handöl. The majority of the survivors arrived at Handöl on the 15 and 16 January N.S. (4 and 5 January O.S.). About 3,000 men remained on the mountain, frozen to death. During the continued voyage down to Duved, where lodging had been arranged for the soldiers, another 700 men died. About 600 of the surviving 2,100 soldiers were crippled for life. Over two thirds of the victims were Finns.

== Aftermath ==
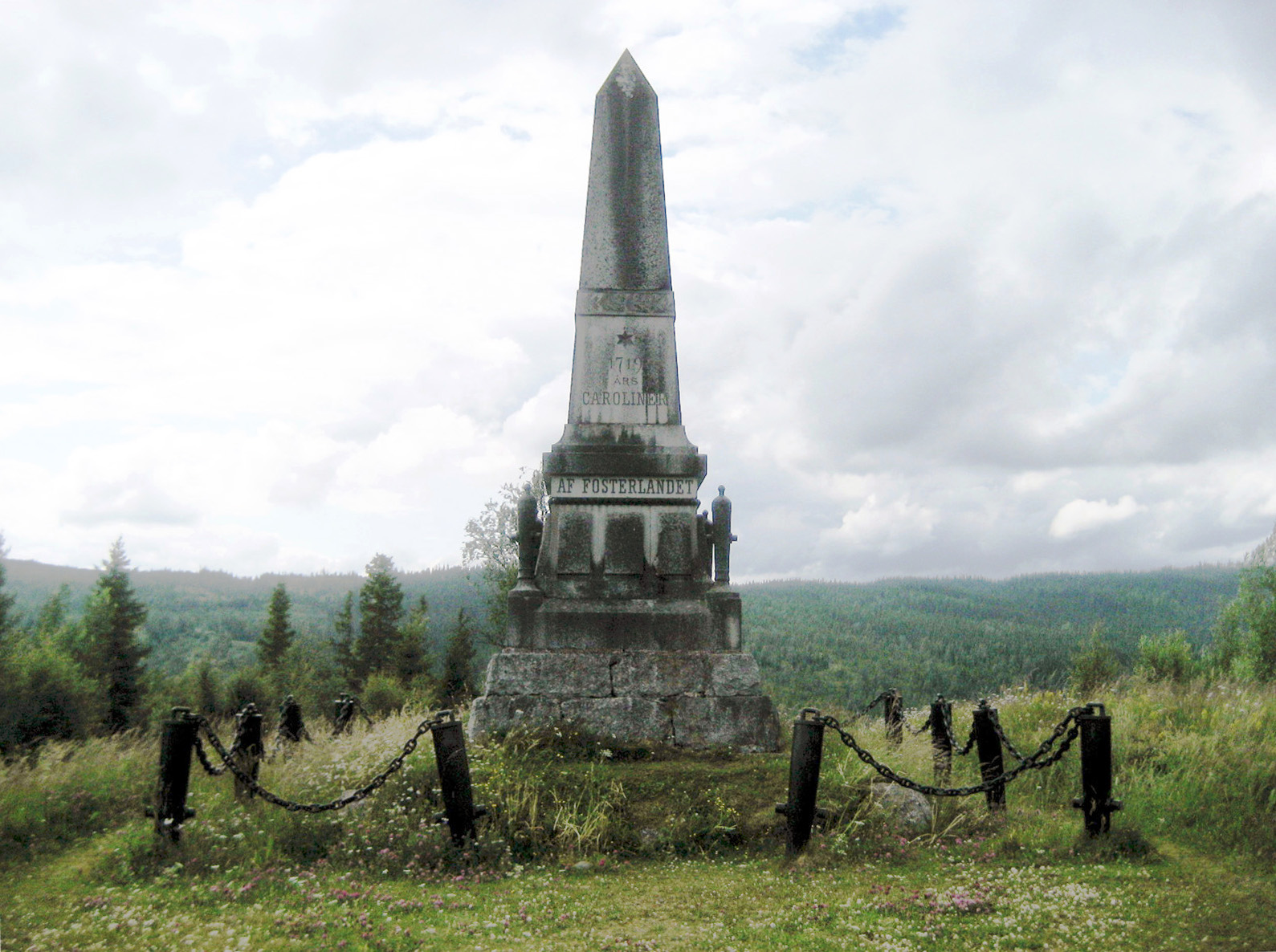
Karolinermonumentet, a memorial in Duved commemorating the Caroleans who died during the Carolean Death March.

On 18 January, Norwegian major Emahusen set off up the mountain on the trail of the Swedish army. He found hundreds of dead Caroleans. The horses that were still alive ran around without riders, while others lay collapsed harnessed to fully loaded sleds, where the driver, with a glazed expression, still held the reins in a frozen grip.

Norwegians took a great deal of loot that winter. They found masses of swords and rifles; six smaller cannons were found abandoned on the mountain. The locals plundered the dead of boots, coats, valuables and weapons. Musket barrels could be used for hardware in fireplaces or for axles in grindstones.

In Brekka Bygdetun in Tydal, an open-air theatre performance of "Karolinerspelet" is held every other year in January, dramatizing the events of the Death March.

In Røros, another Norwegian town visited by Swedish soldiers, an annual outdoor musical theater production called Elden is staged in late July/early August on the Røros slag heaps. The show is one of the largest outdoor theater productions in Norway, and includes the use of live horses. It is widely renowned in the local area, having sold over 10,000 tickets to its nine 2014 shows.

In 2012, the Falun-based band Sabaton released "Ruina Imperii", a song about the Carolean Death March as a part of the album Carolus Rex.

== Literature ==
- Karl-Aage Schwartzkopf (2023) [1960]. Yngste Karolinen (in Swedish). ISBN 9788726373004.
- Anders Hansson (1990). Karolinernas dödsmarsch i Jämtlandsfjällen (in Swedish). Jämtlands läns museum. ISBN 9789179480516.
- Anders Larsson (2022). Karolinska uniformer och munderingar åren 1700–1721 (in Swedish). Jengel Förlag. ISBN 978-91-88573-43-8.
