= Selbu =

Selbu may refer to:

== Places ==
- Selbu Municipality, a municipality in Trøndelag county, Norway
- Selbu Church, a church in Selbu Municipality in Trøndelag county, Norway
- Mebonden (sometimes Selbu), a village within Selbu Municipality in Trøndelag county, Norway

== Other ==
- Selbu, a knitting pattern also known as the Selburose
- Selbu mittens, a type of knitted mitten from Norway
- Selbu BK, a sports club based in Selbu Municipality in Trøndelag county, Norway
- Selbu IL, a sports club based in Selbu Municipality in Trøndelag county, Norway
