= Græsli =

Village in Tydal Municipality, Norway

- Village
- Interactive map of Græsli
- Location within Trøndelag Location within Norway
- Coordinates: 63.0593°N 11.4537°E
- Country: Norway
- Region: Central Norway
- County: Trøndelag
- District: Neadalen
- Municipality: Tydal Municipality
- Elevation: 282 m (925 ft)
- Time zone: UTC+01:00 (CET)
  - Summer (DST): UTC+02:00 (CEST)
- Post Code: 7590 Tydal

Græsli is a village in Tydal Municipality in Trøndelag county, Norway. The village is located along the Nea River, about 10 kilometres (6.2 mi) west of the municipal center of Ås and about 6.5 kilometres (4.0 mi) west of the village of Aungrenda.

== History ==
Historically, the spelling of the name was Gressli. In 1878, 2,253 coins were found on the Gressli farm during potato hilling on a spot where there had once been a heap of rocks. The Gressli discovery is our most important source of knowledge about Olav Kyrre's extensive minting in Norway from 1067 until 1093. In 1881, a meticulous record of the find was published by L. B. Stenersen, the director of the Coin Cabinet. It has since been studied by a series of scholars.
