= Flora, Trøndelag =

Village in Selbu Municipality, Norway

Flora
- Village
- Interactive map of Flora
- Location within Trøndelag Location within Norway
- Coordinates: 63.1111°N 11.3080°E
- Country: Norway
- Region: Central Norway
- County: Trøndelag
- District: Neadalen
- Municipality: Selbu Municipality
- Elevation: 221 m (725 ft)
- Time zone: UTC+01:00 (CET)
  - Summer (DST): UTC+02:00 (CEST)
- Post Code: 7596 Flaknan

Flora is a village in Selbu Municipality in Trøndelag county, Norway. It is located along the Nea River, about 25 kilometres (16 mi) southeast of the municipal center of Mebonden and about 10 kilometres (6.2 mi) northwest of the village of Græsli in the neighboring Tydal Municipality. The Flora Chapel is located in this village.
