= Tydal Church =

Church in Trøndelag, Norway

- Tydal kirke
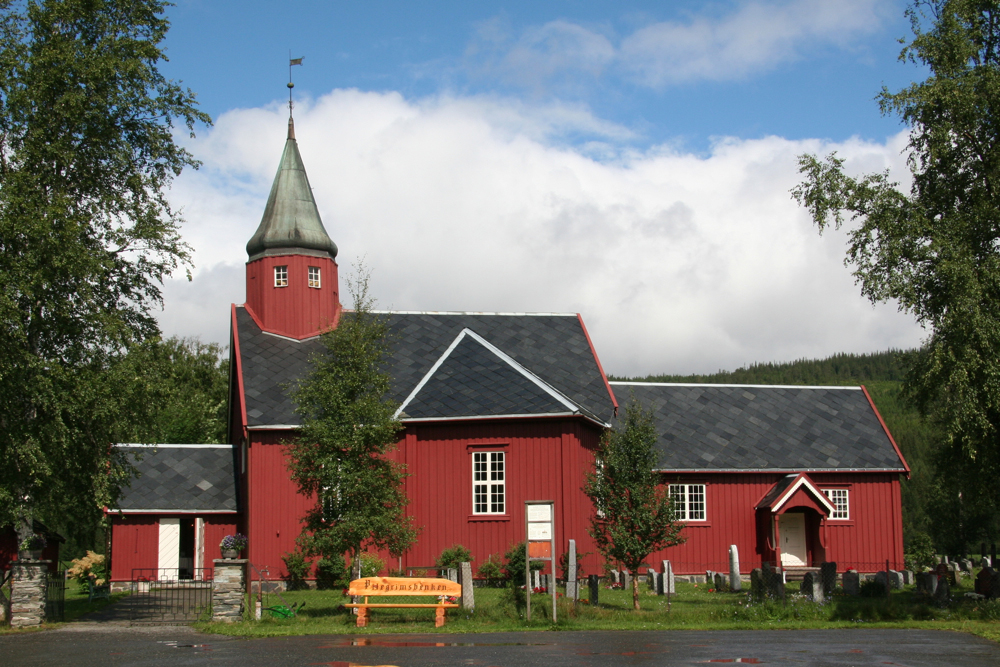
- View of the church
- Tydal Church
- 63.05585748°N 11.5657456219°E
- Location: Tydal Municipality, Trøndelag
- Country: Norway
- Denomination: Church of Norway
- Churchmanship: Evangelical Lutheran

History
- Status: Parish church
- Founded: c. 1200
- Consecrated: 1696

Architecture
- Functional status: Active
- Architect: Ole Jonsen Hindrum
- Architectural type: Y-shaped/long church
- Completed: 1696 (330 years ago)

Specifications
- Capacity: 270
- Materials: Wood

Administration
- Diocese: Nidaros bispedømme
- Deanery: Stjørdal prosti
- Parish: Tydal
- Norwegian Cultural Heritage Site
- Type: Church
- Status: Automatically protected
- ID: 85692

Tydal Church (Norwegian: Tydal kirke) is a parish church of the Church of Norway in Tydal Municipality in Trøndelag county, Norway. It is located in the village of Aunet, on the northern shore of the Nea River, about 5 kilometres (3.1 mi) west of the municipal center of Ås. It is the main church for the Tydal parish which is part of the Stjørdal prosti (deanery) in the Diocese of Nidaros. The red, wooden church was originally built in a Y-shaped style in 1696 by the architect Ole Jonsen Hindrum. The church has been remodeled several times to enlarge and repair it and now it has more of a long church design than its original Y-shaped design. The church currently seats about 270 people.

== History ==
The earliest existing historical records of the church date back to the year 1589, but the church was likely built around the year 1200. The first church in Tydal was likely a stave church and it was located about 6 kilometres (3.7 mi) southeast of the present site of the church. The church's nave measured about 7.6 by 6.8 metres (25 ft × 22 ft) and the chancel measured about 3 by 3.8 metres (9.8 ft × 12.5 ft). The medieval church served all of Tydal as an annex chapel under the nearby Selbu Church. After the Black Death, the population of Tydal was very low with only a handful of active farms in the whole valley.

In 1696, the old church was torn down and moved about 6 kilometres (3.7 mi) to the northwest, further down the valley. Most of the furniture and decor from the old church was replaced with new material in the new church, but two carved planks were brought to the new church from the old church at Kirkvoll. The planks are slightly over 2 metres (6 ft 7 in) long and have a cut-through decoration and they are used to form the side pieces on a bench. They can be dated to the first half of the 1300s. The church was built and consecrated in 1696. It was designed as a Y-shaped building which is pretty rare in Norway. The church was built by Ole Jonsen Hindrum, who also built other Y-shaped churches.

In 1814, this church served as an election church (Norwegian: valgkirke). Together with more than 300 other parish churches across Norway, it was a polling station for elections to the 1814 Norwegian Constituent Assembly which wrote the Constitution of Norway. This was Norway's first national elections. Each church parish was a constituency that elected people called "electors" who later met together in each county to elect the representatives for the assembly that was to meet at Eidsvoll Manor later that year.

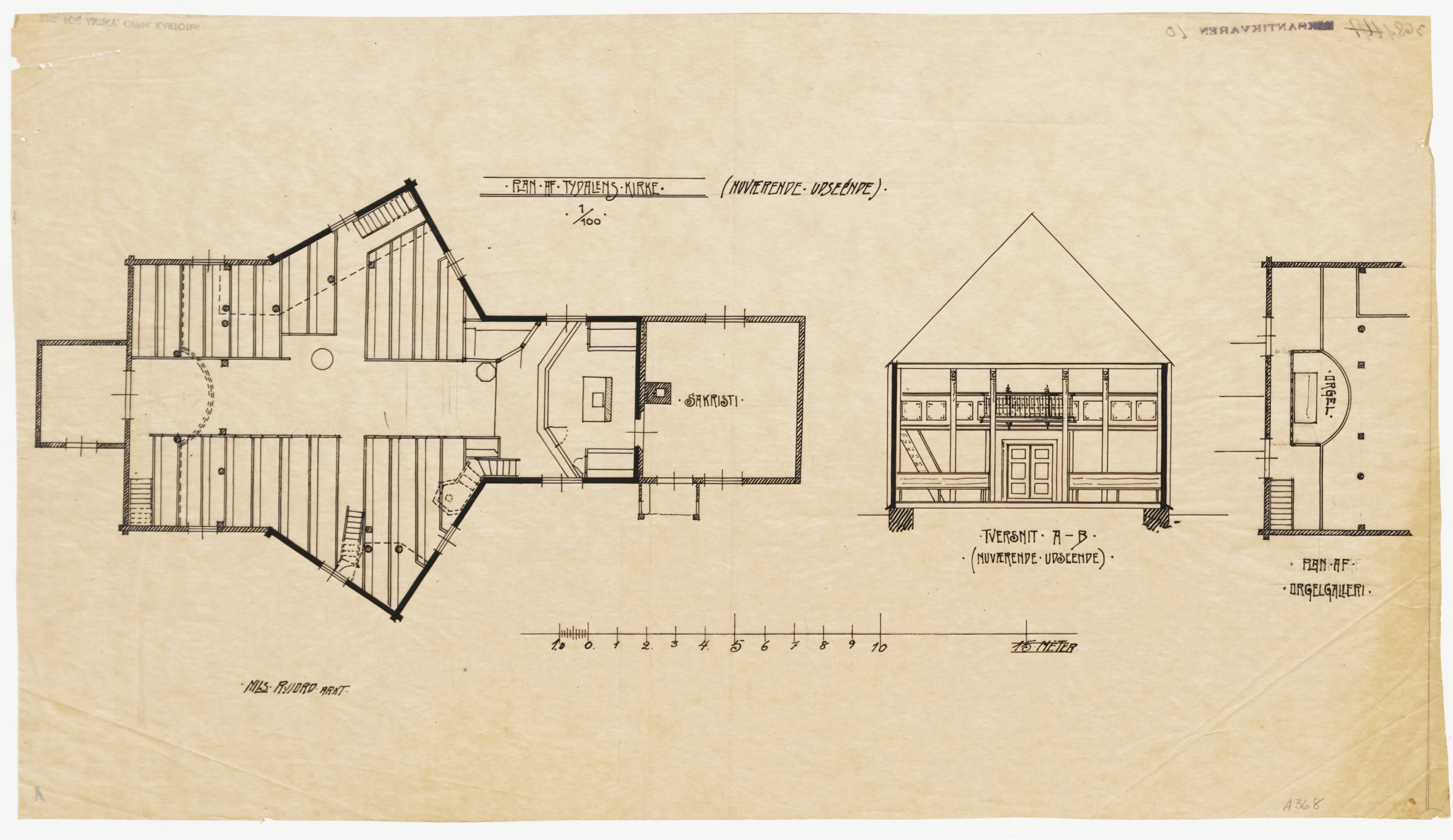
Floor plan of the church (since 1836)

From 1833 to 1836, the church was expanded and rebuilt converting it from a y-shape design more of a long church design with some "wings" protruding out the sides where the old Y-shaped walls stand. This means it is no longer a true Y-shaped church nor is it a true long church, but some sort of hybrid between the two. Ole Pedersen Qvam was the builder. There is a choir in what was the eastern arm of the old Y-church, and this part seems to have its original ceiling height. The wings to the northwest and southwest protrude slightly beyond the eastern part of the nave after the renovation, but the two wings have been integrated into the main room. Here the roof is made higher than it was in the Y-church, and the nave is also wider than some of the wings of the Y-church, as it goes from corner to corner on these. There is now a sacristy behind the altarpiece, on the east end of the choir. The nave has a small tower on the west end of the roof ridge. There is also an entry porch on the west end of the building.

== See also ==
- List of churches in Nidaros
