= Balstad =

Balstad is a Norwegian surname. Notable people with the surname include:

- Inga Balstad (born 1952), Norwegian politician
- Jan Balstad (born 1937), Norwegian labour leader and politician

== See also ==
- Ballstad
