= Fongen =

Mountain in Trøndelag, Norway

Fongen (Norwegian) Lopmesvaerie (Southern Sami)
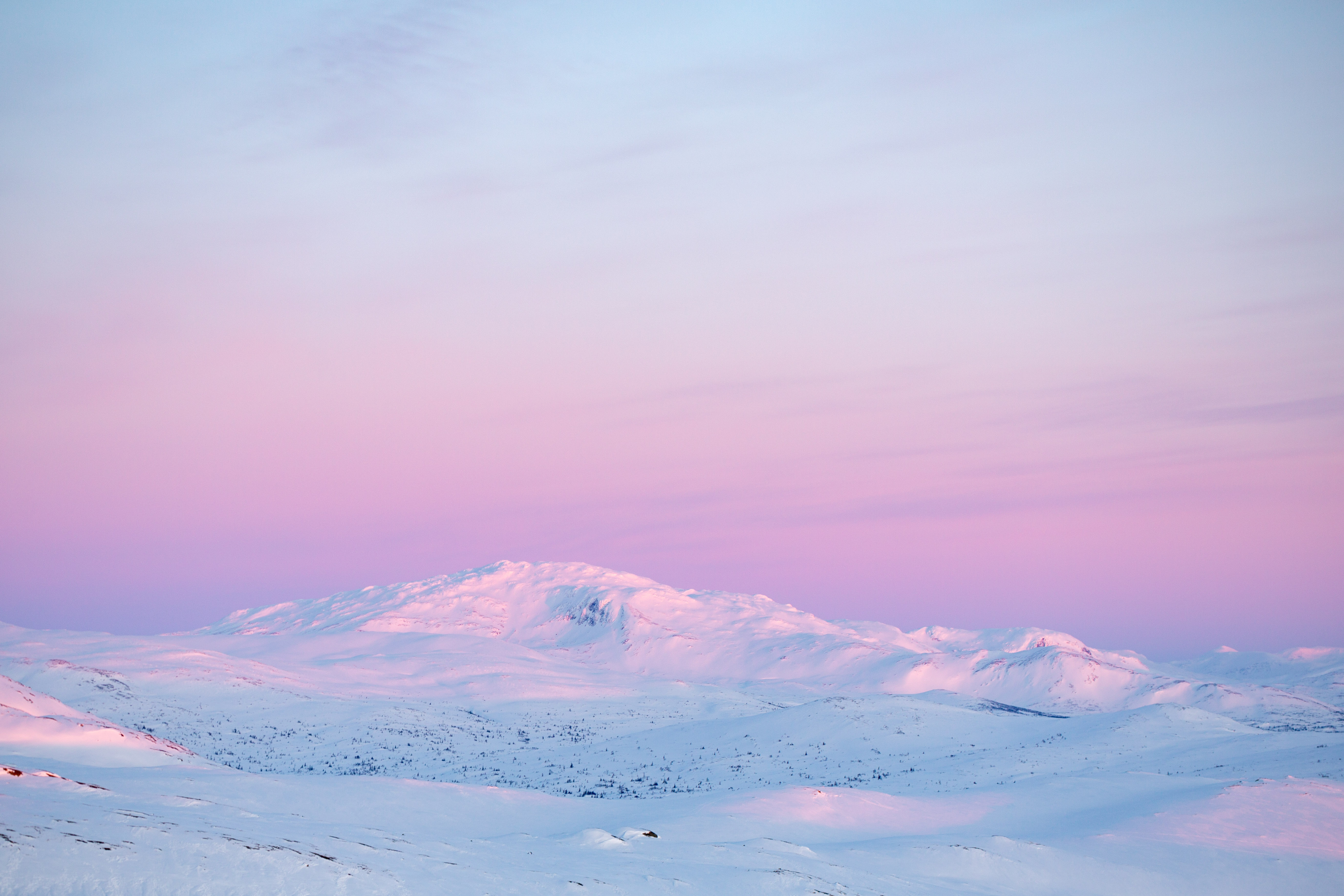
- Fongen seen from north-west in the sunset in winter.

Highest point
- Elevation: 1,441 m (4,728 ft)
- Prominence: 651 m (2,136 ft)
- Isolation: 31 to 31.2 km (19.3 to 19.4 mi)
- Coordinates: 63.1808°N 11.6306°E

Geography
- Interactive map of the mountain
- Location: Trøndelag, Norway
- Topo map: 1721 III Tydal

Fongen (Norwegian) or Lopmesvaerie (Southern Sami) is a mountain in Trøndelag county, Norway. The mountain sits along the tripoint border of Selbu Municipality, Tydal Municipality, and Meråker Municipality. The 1,441-metre (4,728 ft) summit is located inside the Skarvan and Roltdalen National Park. The nearest villages are Mebonden in Selbu Municipality, about 25 kilometres (16 mi) to the southwest, Ås in Tydal Municipality, about 32 kilometres (20 mi) to the southeast, and the village of Midtbygda in Meråker Municipality. The closest Norwegian Trekking Association cabin is Ramsjøhytta, several kilometers to the east of the summit.

== Name ==
The name is probably the finite form of fong which means "pole" (used in roundpole fence). It is common in Norway to compare the form of high and steep mountains with staffs, sticks, and poles.
