= Skarvan and Roltdalen National Park =

National park in Trøndelag, Norway

- IUCN category II (national park)

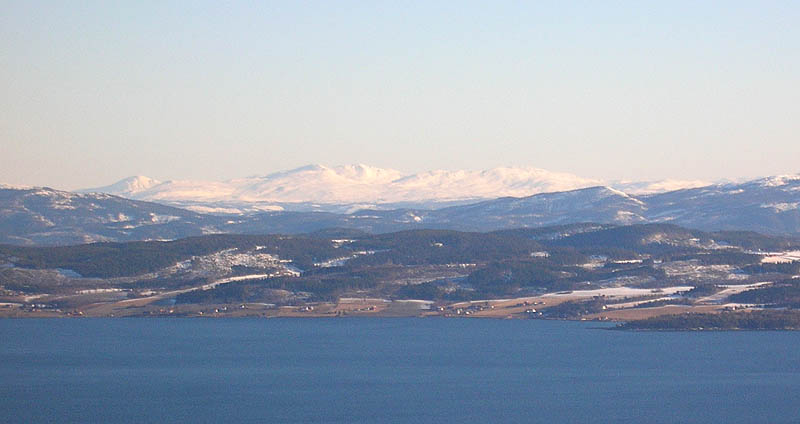
- The Skarvan mountains seen from across the Trondheimsfjord
- Interactive map of Skarvan and Roltdalen National Park
- Location: Trøndelag, Norway
- Coordinates: 63°13′N 11°25′E
- Area: 441.5 km^{2} (109,100 acres)
- Established: 2004
- Governing body: Directorate for Nature Management

Skarvan and Roltdalen National Park (Norwegian: Skarvan og Roltdalen nasjonalpark) is a national park in Trøndelag county, Norway. The park is located in the municipalities of Selbu, Tydal, Meråker, and Stjørdal, not too far from the border with Sweden to the east.

The 441.5-square-kilometre (170.5 sq mi) park was opened in 2004 and it borders the Stråsjøen-Prestøyan nature reserve. The park includes a large spruce forested area (the Roltdalen valley is the largest roadless mountain valley in southern Trøndelag county) as well as the Skarvan mountainous region which is typical of the Trøndelag region, both in cultural and natural history.

The Skarvan mountains, which stretch from Ruten to Fongen is the most notable mountainous area in the region. Trondhjems Turistforening maintains a network of touring trails connecting Roltdalen to the trail network of the Nord-Trøndelag Tourist Association and trails in the Sylan area.

== Biodiversity ==
Skarvan and Roltdalen National Park encompasses a broad elevational gradient from mixed spruce–pine forests in the mellomboreal zone (Norway’'s low‑boreal vegetation belt, typically from sea level up to about 500 m above sea level) to alpine heath above 1 000 m. Peatlands cover over 40 % of the park, with blanket mires and string mires dominating the valley bottoms and heathland more common on drier slopes. Vegetation types vary in their sensitivity to trampling: bog and lichen heaths are highly vulnerable, heathlands moderately so, and grassland communities the most resilient. Recovery on wet peat can take decades, making proactive trail placement and boardwalk installation essential to prevent long‑term damage.

Avifaunal surveys recorded 86 species across four case-study areas, with particular emphasis on waterfowl and other wetland birds. Forty of these species were assessed for disturbance sensitivity based on nesting behaviour and red‑list status. Species such as whooper swan Cygnus cygnus), black-throated loon (Gavia arctica) and Eurasian curlew (Numenius arquata) score highest for vulnerability, owing to their low tolerance of human presence in the breeding season. Commoner waterbirds and grassland species display lower sensitivity but still benefit from designated nesting buffers and carefully routed footpaths.

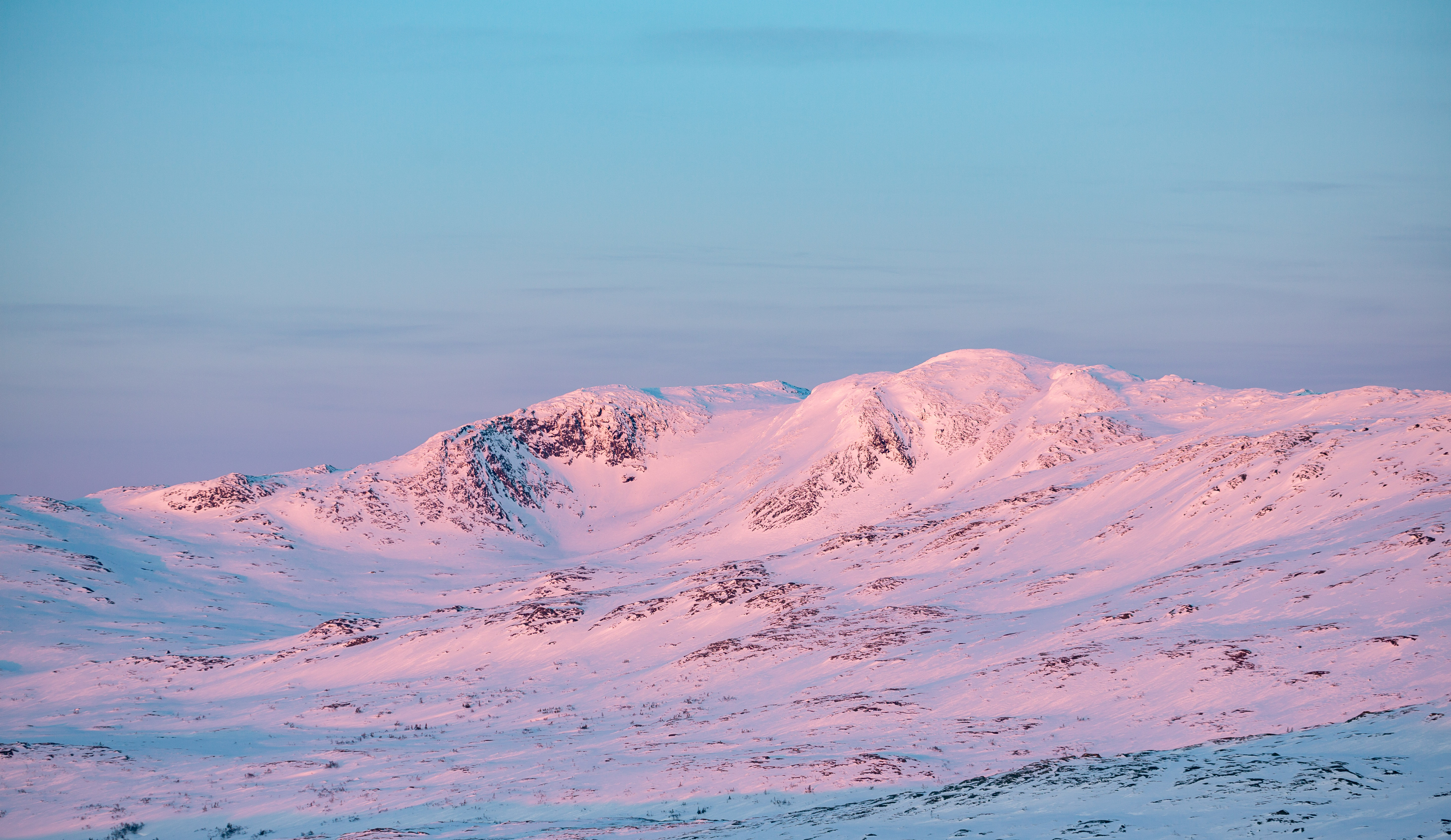
Skarvan as seen from west from the top of Gråfjellet

Focused surveys of the park's alpine‑nesting waterfowl complement broader avifaunal assessments. Four sea duck species—common scoter (Melanitta nigra), long-tailed duck (Clangula hyemalis), greater scaup (Aythya marila) and velvet scoter (Melanitta fusca)—have been confirmed breeding in high‑altitude tarns and lakes within Skarvan and Roltdalen NP. Estimated breeding pairs within the park amount to roughly 200–300 common scoter, 40–50 long‑tailed duck, 15–25 greater scaup and 5–10 white‑winged scoter, emphasising the area's importance as a stronghold for these species. Most nesting sites lie in the eastern alpine belt, typically in shallow, fish‑free mountain lakes where invertebrate prey is plentiful, demonstrating the need for disturbance‑free buffers and careful trail management around key water bodies to safeguard breeding success.

== Conservation and visitor management ==
To safeguard sensitive vegetation, raised boardwalks have been installed on key wetland trails—particularly the route from Vekta to Prestøyan—to channel foot traffic away from mires and lichen heaths. In alpine areas, where soil formation is slow, trail alignment follows ridgelines and dry substrates to minimise trampling. Regular maintenance of these structures is vital, as even minor breaches can lead visitors to stray into vulnerable habitats. Strategic trail planning, informed by detailed vegetation mapping, ensures that visitor access does not compromise the park's ecological integrity.

Breeding birds require spatial buffers to prevent nest abandonment. Empirical studies in Norwegian mountain reserves recommend at least 500 m between trails and raptor nests (e.g. golden eagle, gyrfalcon) and 200 m for sensitive waterbird colonies. Standardised buffers of 100–200 m around swan and crane nests, and 50–100 m around less sensitive species, help balance visitor experience with wildlife protection. Seasonal trail closures or reroutes during peak nesting months further reduce disturbance risk, ensuring that both plant communities and ground‑nesting birds can complete their breeding cycles undisturbed.
