= Sørungen =

Lake in Selbu, Norway

- Interactive map of the lake
- Location: Selbu Municipality, Trøndelag
- Coordinates: 63.1236°N 10.9445°E
- Primary outflows: Gullsetelva
- Catchment area: Nea-Nidelvvassdraget
- Basin countries: Norway
- Max. length: 5 kilometres (3.1 mi)
- Max. width: 2.5 kilometres (1.6 mi)
- Surface area: 7.24 km^{2} (2.80 sq mi)
- Shore length^{1}: 17.29 kilometres (10.74 mi)
- Surface elevation: 452 metres (1,483 ft)
- References: NVE
- ^{1} Shore length is not a well-defined measure.

Sørungen is a lake that is located in the Selbu Municipality in Trøndelag county, Norway. The 7.24-square-kilometre (2.80 sq mi) lake is located about 8 kilometres (5.0 mi) south of the village of Vikvarvet.

It is about 18 kilometres (11 mi) west of the village of Flora, and about 10 kilometres (6.2 mi) northeast of the lake Samsjøen in the neighboring Midtre Gauldal Municipality.

== See also ==
- List of lakes in Norway
