= Hans Olav Sørensen =

Norwegian ski jumper

Hans Olav Sørensen (born 16 November 1942, in Selbu Municipality) is a Norwegian former ski jumper who competed from 1963 to 1966. He finished eighth in the individual normal hill event at the 1964 Winter Olympics in Innsbruck.

Sørensen's best career finish was fifth in an individual normal hill event in West Germany in 1963.

Sørensen held the ski jumping record at the Kløvstienbakken jump, at the Medal IL Ski Club, for two years, 1962-64
