= Kjersti Synneva Moen =

Norwegian illustrator and cartoonist (born 1995)

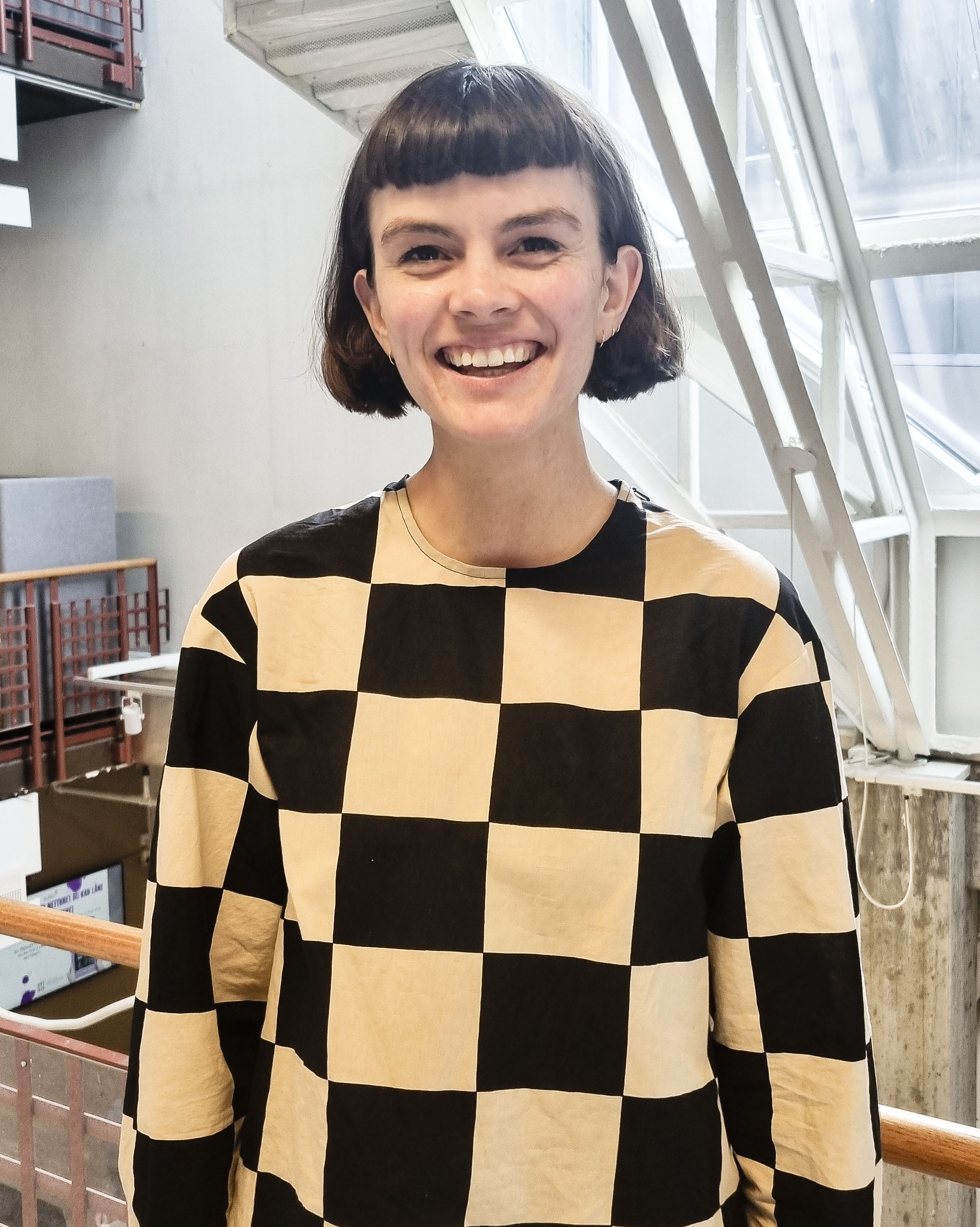
- Moen in 2024
- Born: 8 July 1995 (age 31)
- Citizenship: Norway
- Education: Einar Granum Kunstfagskole
- Occupations: Illustrator; cartoonist
- Writing career
- Notable awards: Pondusprisen 2023 Grip den føkkings dagen; Kulturdepartementets tegneseriepris 2024 Grip den føkkings dagen
- Website: kjerstisynneva.no

Kjersti Synneva Moen (born 8 July 1995) is a Norwegian illustrator and cartoonist. Her most notable work is Grip den føkkings dagen (2023), a comic book she received multiple awards and nominations for.

== Life ==
Moen was born 8 July 1995 and grew up in Selbu Municipality, Norway. She moved from Selbu to attend Ole Vig Upper Secondary School in Stjørdal, where her education focused on music. She later got an education in drawing at Einar Granum Kunstfagskole in Oslo. She participated several times in UKM, a series of youth cultural events in Norway, where she would showcase a cappella and other musical ventures.

== Career ==
Moen has done work for Gyldendal, Mental Helse Ungdom, Women's Front, the Norwegian Humanist Association, and the Norwegian Trekking Association. Aside from visual art, she is a vocalist in the band Rabagast.

In 2023, she published Grip den føkkings dagen through Aschehoug, which was met with positive feedback from critics, including critics writing for NRK, Empirix, and Dagens Næringsliv. Due to the release, she was awarded Pondusprisen in 2023, and Kulturdepartementets tegneseriepris (Norwegian, "the Ministry of Culture's Award for Comics") in 2024. She also received nominations for multiple awards, including Trollkrittet and SPROING-prisen.

== Bibliography ==
- Pappa er dustete (Ær, 2022) by Alba Shirin Jafari Dannveig – as illustrator
- Grip den føkkings dagen (Aschehoug, 2023) – author and illustrator
