= Flora Chapel =

Church in Trøndelag, Norway

- Flora kapell
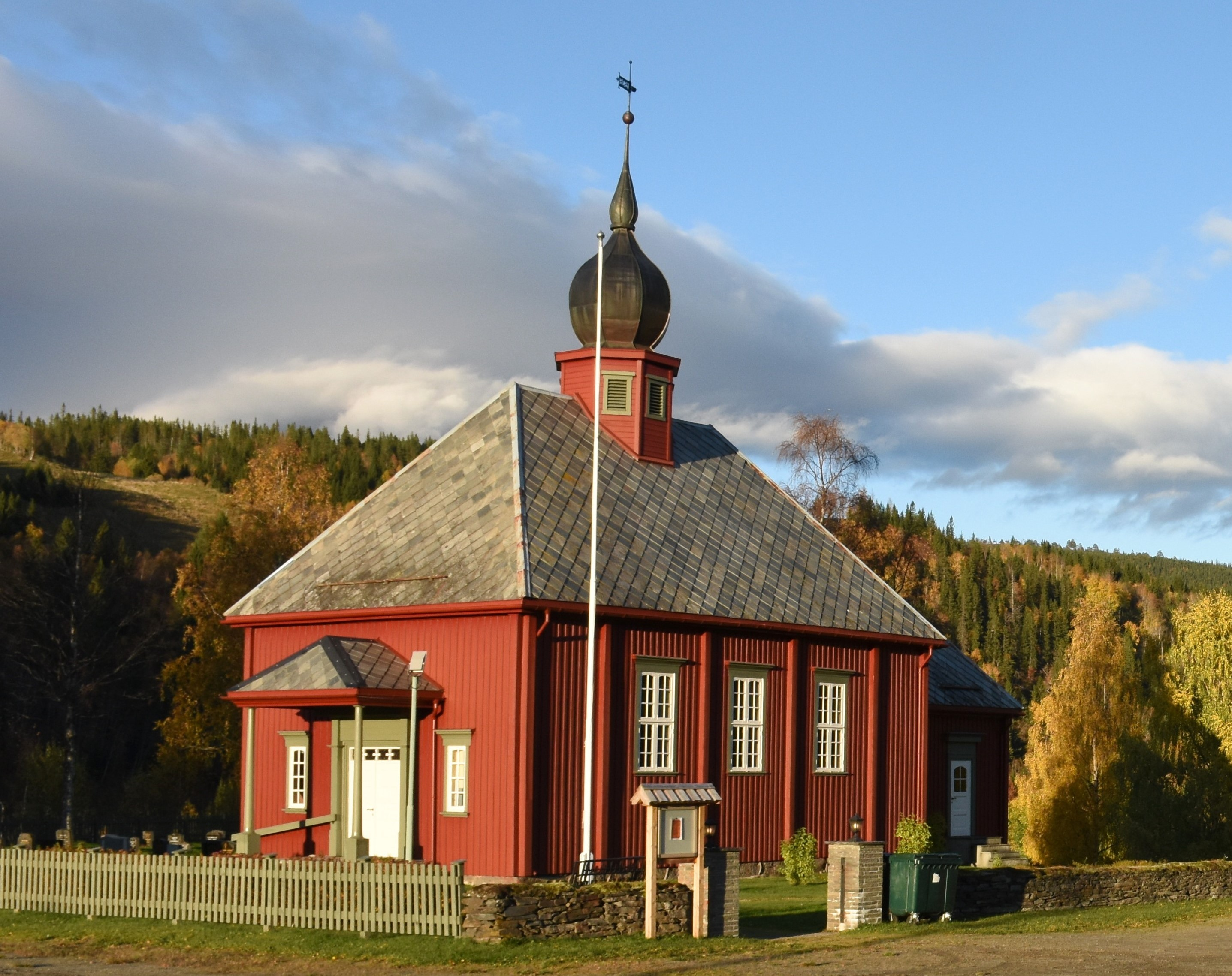
- View of the church
- Flora Chapel
- 63.109488965°N 11.309425682°E
- Location: Selbu Municipality, Trøndelag
- Country: Norway
- Denomination: Church of Norway
- Churchmanship: Evangelical Lutheran

History
- Status: Parish church
- Founded: 1936
- Consecrated: 1936

Architecture
- Functional status: Active
- Architect(s): Anton Kjelstad and Ivar Grylland
- Architectural type: Long church
- Completed: 1936 (90 years ago)

Specifications
- Capacity: 140
- Materials: Wood

Administration
- Diocese: Nidaros bispedømme
- Deanery: Stjørdal prosti
- Parish: Selbu
- Norwegian Cultural Heritage Site
- Type: Church
- Status: Not protected
- ID: 84162

Flora Chapel (Norwegian: Flora kapell) is a parish church of the Church of Norway in Selbu Municipality in Trøndelag county, Norway. It is located in the village of Flora. It is one of the churches for the Selbu parish which is part of the Stjørdal prosti (deanery) in the Diocese of Nidaros. The red, wooden church was built in a long church style in 1936 using plans drawn up by the architects Anton Kjelstad and Ivar Grylland. The church seats about 140 people.

== History ==
The first church in Flora was built in 1936. It is a small long church with a hipped roof over the nave. There is a small onion dome on the roof above the nave. The altarpiece has a crucifixion picture painted by Anton Kjeldstad in 1936. The pulpit was made by John Renå and the baptismal font by Olav Engen. Two bells in the tower were cast by Olsen & Søn in 1936, and the organ was built by Brødrene Torkildsen in 1959.

== See also ==
- List of churches in Nidaros
