= Storsylen =

Mountain in Trøndelag, Norway

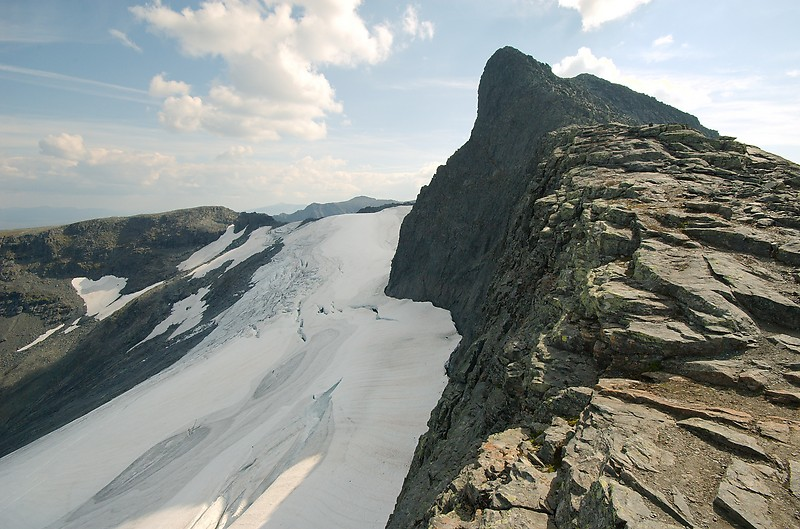
- Summit seen from the northern ridge, along main hiking route

Highest point
- Elevation: 1,762 m (5,781 ft)
- Prominence: 640 m (2,100 ft)
- Isolation: 17.5 to 17.7 km (10.9 to 11.0 mi)
- Coordinates: 63.0202°N 12.1988°E

Geography
- Interactive map of the mountain
- Location: Trøndelag, Norway
- Parent range: Sylan
- Topo map: 1721 II Tydal

Climbing
- Easiest route: Hiking

Storsylen is a mountain in Tydal Municipality in Trøndelag county, Norway. At 1,762 metres (5,781 ft), Storsylen is the highest mountain in the Sylan mountain range. The mountain summit lies less than 100 metres (330 ft) west of the national border with Sweden and about 8 kilometres (5.0 mi) east of the lake Nesjøen. To climb the mountain from the south, the route is characterized as scrambling, from the north it is an easy hike.

== Name ==
The first element is stor meaning "big" and the last element is the finite singular form of syl which means "awl".

== Media gallery ==
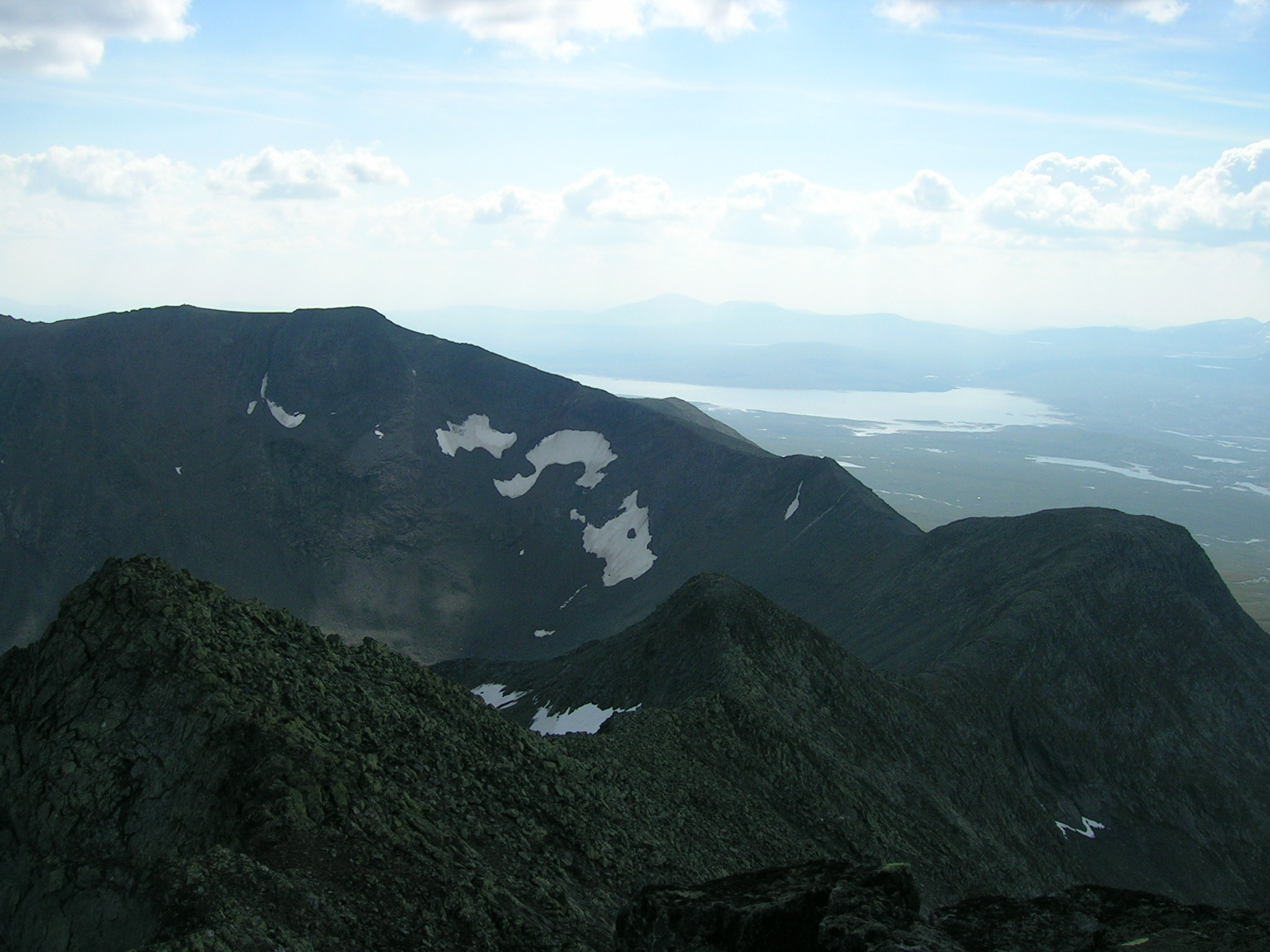
View towards south

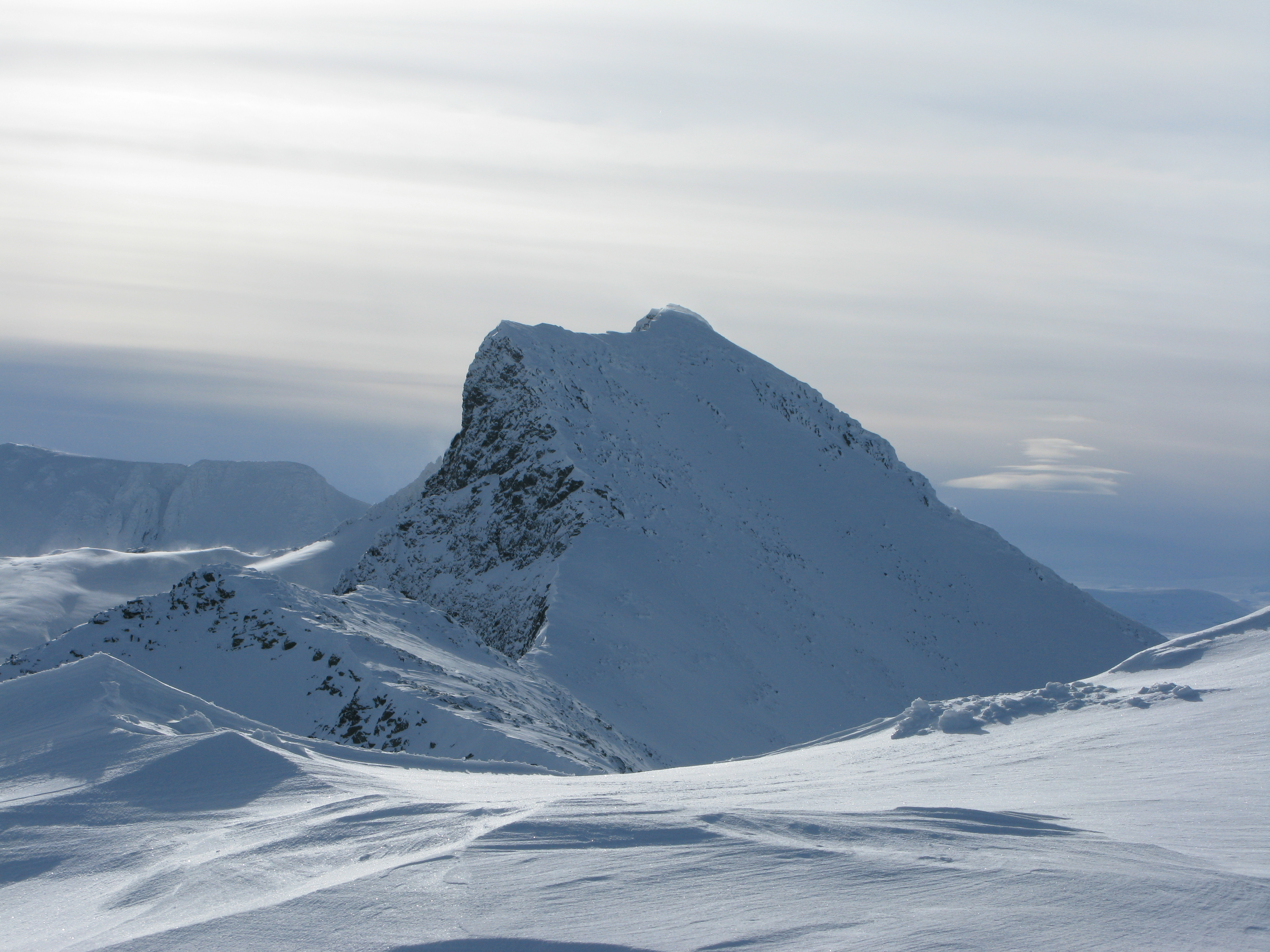
Storsylen mountain

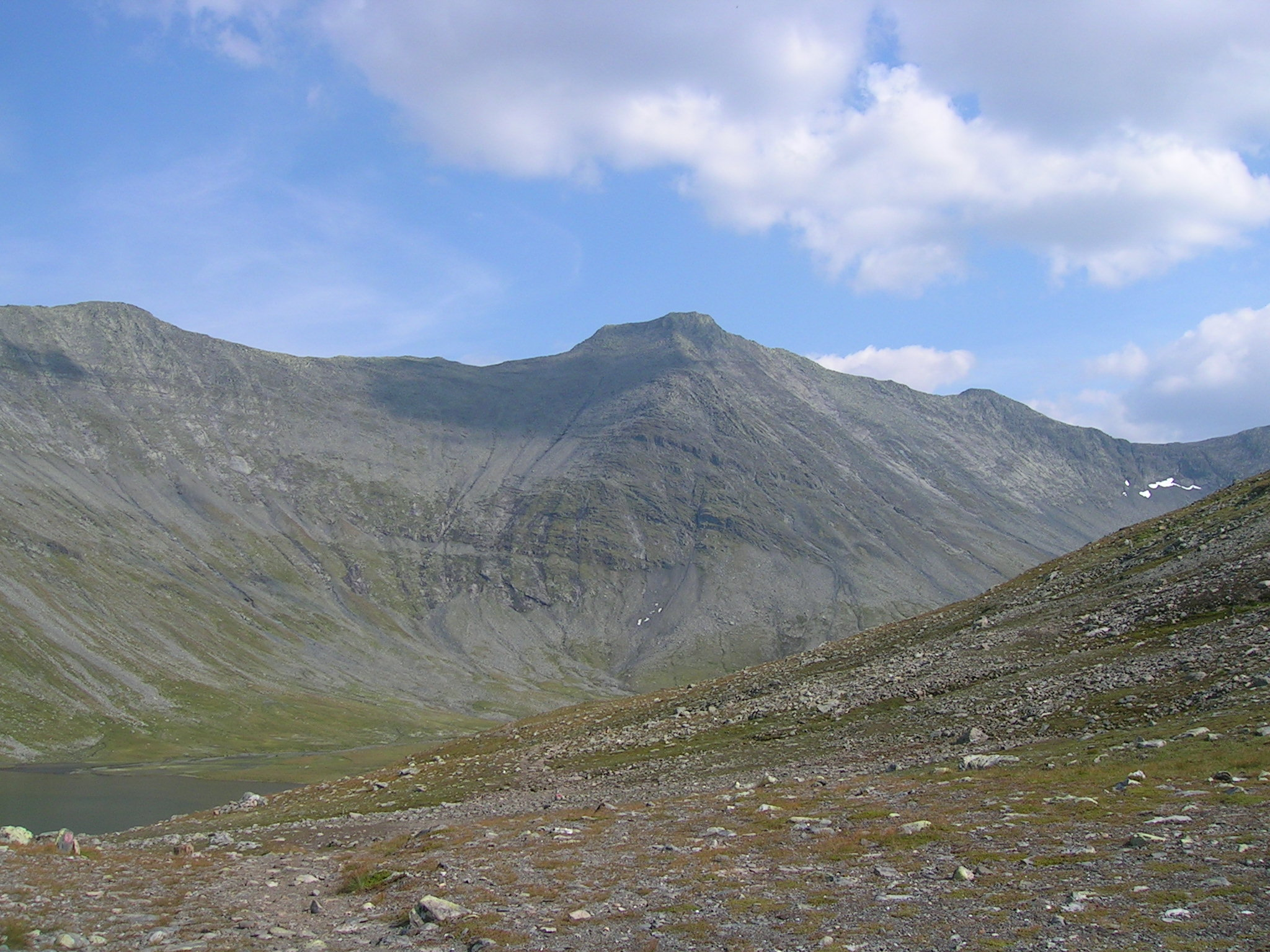
View of Storsylen

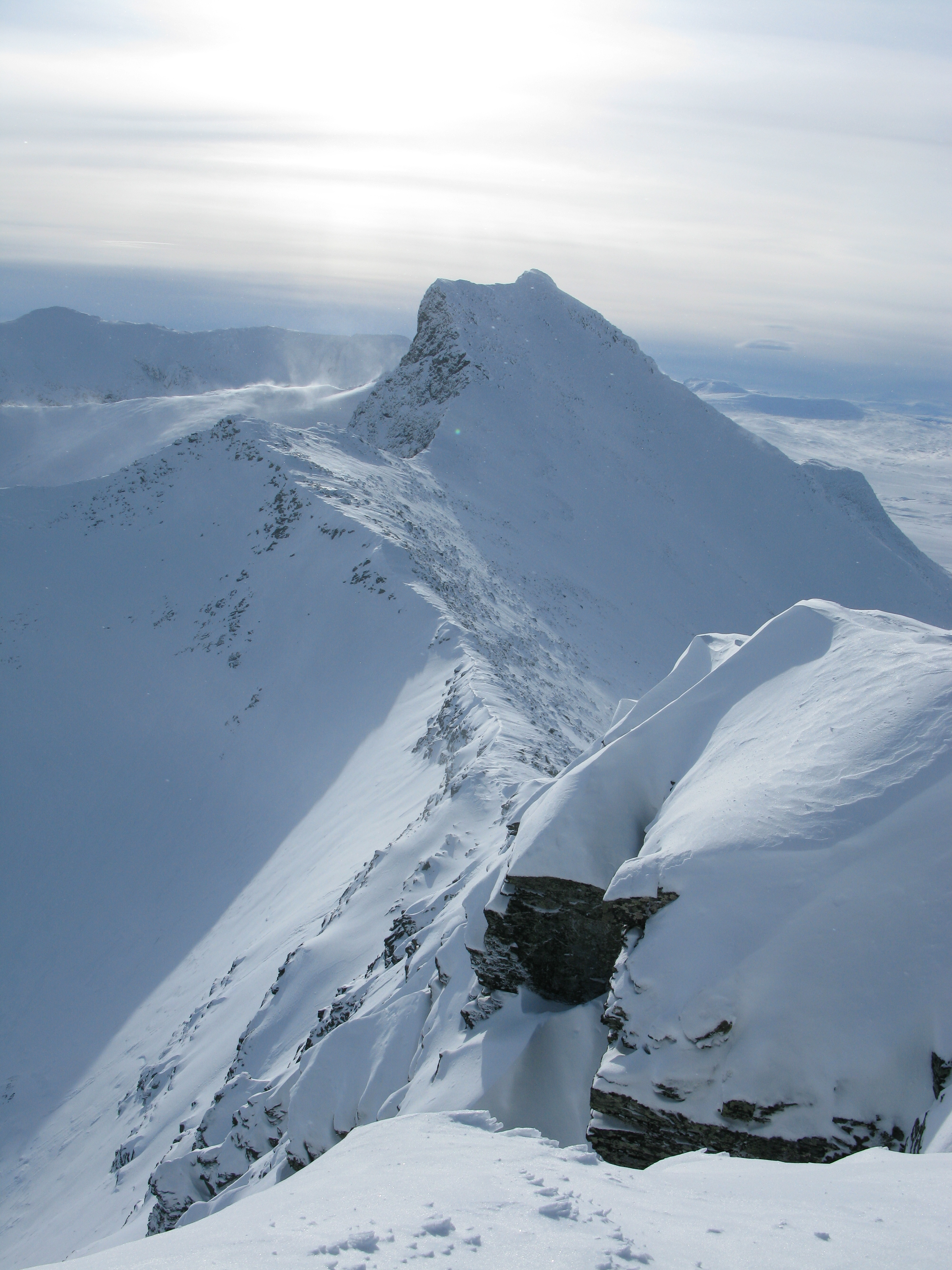
View of the peak
