= Tydal Municipality =

Municipality in Trøndelag, Norway

Tydal Municipality Tydal kommune Tijdaelie
- Municipality
- Tydalen herred (historic name)
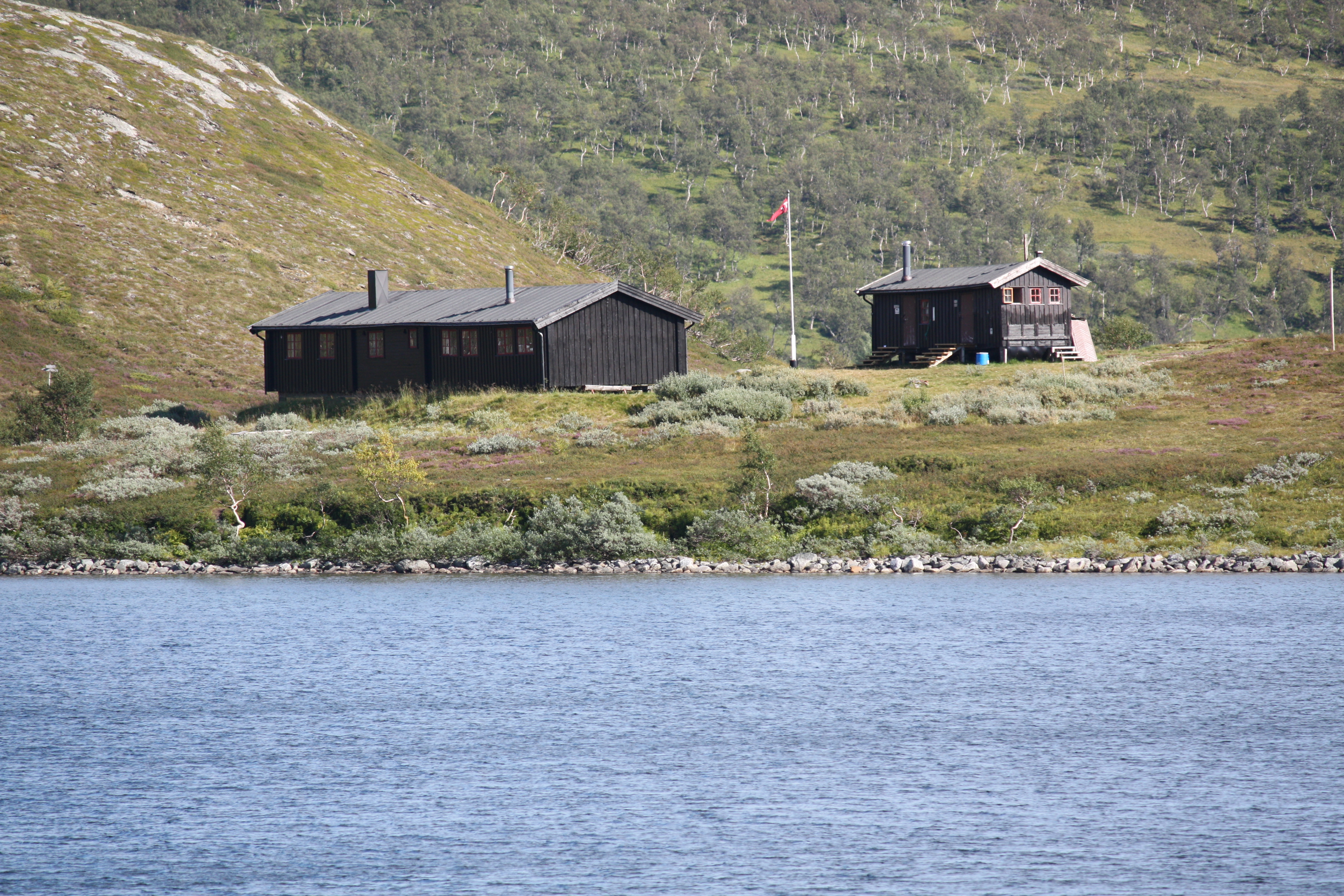

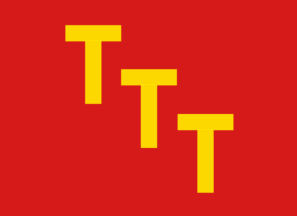
- Flag Coat of arms

- Trøndelag within Norway

- Tydal within Trøndelag
- Coordinates: 63°01′06″N 11°48′54″E
- Country: Norway
- County: Trøndelag
- District: Neadalen
- Established: 1 Jan 1901
  - Preceded by: Selbu Municipality
- Administrative centre: Ås

Government
  - Mayor (2019): Jens Arne Kvello (Sp)

Area
  - Total: 1,328.66 km^{2} (513.00 sq mi)
  - Land: 1,217.37 km^{2} (470.03 sq mi)
  - Water: 111.27 km^{2} (42.96 sq mi) 8.4%
  - Rank: #75 in Norway
- Highest elevation: 1,762.35 m (5,782.0 ft)

Population (2024)
  - Total: 773
  - Rank: #346 in Norway
  - Density: 0.6/km^{2} (1.6/sq mi)
  - Change (10 years): ▼ −10.5%
- Demonym: Tydaling

Official language
  - Norwegian form: Bokmål
- Time zone: UTC+01:00 (CET)
  - Summer (DST): UTC+02:00 (CEST)
- ISO 3166 code: NO-5033
- Website: Official website

Tydal is a municipality in Trøndelag county, Norway. It is located in the Neadalen/Tydalen valley. The administrative centre of the municipality is the village of Ås. Other villages include Østby, Græsli, Aungrenda, and Stugudalen. There is a school and a kindergarten in Tydal.

The 1,329-square-kilometre (513 sq mi) municipality is the 75th largest by area out of the 357 municipalities in Norway. Tydal Municipality is the 346th most populous municipality in Norway with a population of 773. The municipality's population density is 0.6 inhabitants per square kilometre (1.6/sq mi) and its population has decreased by 10.5% over the previous 10-year period.

The inhabitants of Tydal earn a living in the areas of farming, forestry, energy production, and tourism. During Easter, the number of people in Tydal Municipality increases by up to 5,000 people. Many people from Trondheim celebrate their holidays in the 1,400 cabins located throughout the municipality.

== General information ==
The municipality of Tydal was established on 1 January 1901 when it was separated from the large Selbu Municipality. The initial population of Tydal Municipality was 881. The municipal borders have not changed since that time. On 1 January 2018, the municipality switched from the old Sør-Trøndelag county to the newly created Trøndelag county.

=== Name ===
The municipality (originally the parish) is named after the Tydalen valley (Old Norse: Þýjardalr) since the first Tydal Church was built there. The first element is Þý which is the old name for the Tya River which runs through the valley. The meaning of the river name is unknown, but it could mean "bondmaid". The last element is dalr which means "valley" or "dale". Historically, the name of the municipality was spelled Thidalen or Tydalen. On 3 November 1917, a royal resolution changed the spelling of the name of the municipality to Tydal, removing the definite form ending -en.

=== Coat of arms ===
The coat of arms was granted on 7 February 1997. The official blazon is "Gules, three St. Anthony's crosses in bend Or" (Norwegian: I rødt tre gull Antonius-kors i skrå rekke). This means the arms have a red field (background) and the charge is three St. Anthony's crosses lined up diagonally. The cross design has a tincture of Or which means it is commonly colored yellow, but if it is made out of metal, then gold is used. This design was chosen to represent a power line and the letter T, representing the name of the municipality and the importance of hydroelectric power generation in Tydal. The arms were designed by Einar Skjervold. The municipal flag has the same design as the coat of arms.

=== Churches ===
The Church of Norway has one parish (sokn) within Tydal Municipality. It is part of the Stjørdal prosti (deanery) in the Diocese of Nidaros.

Churches in Tydal Municipality
Parish (sokn)	Church name	Location of the church	Year built
Tydal	Tydal Church	Aungrenda	1696
Tydal	Stugudal Chapel	Stugudalen	1957

== Geography ==
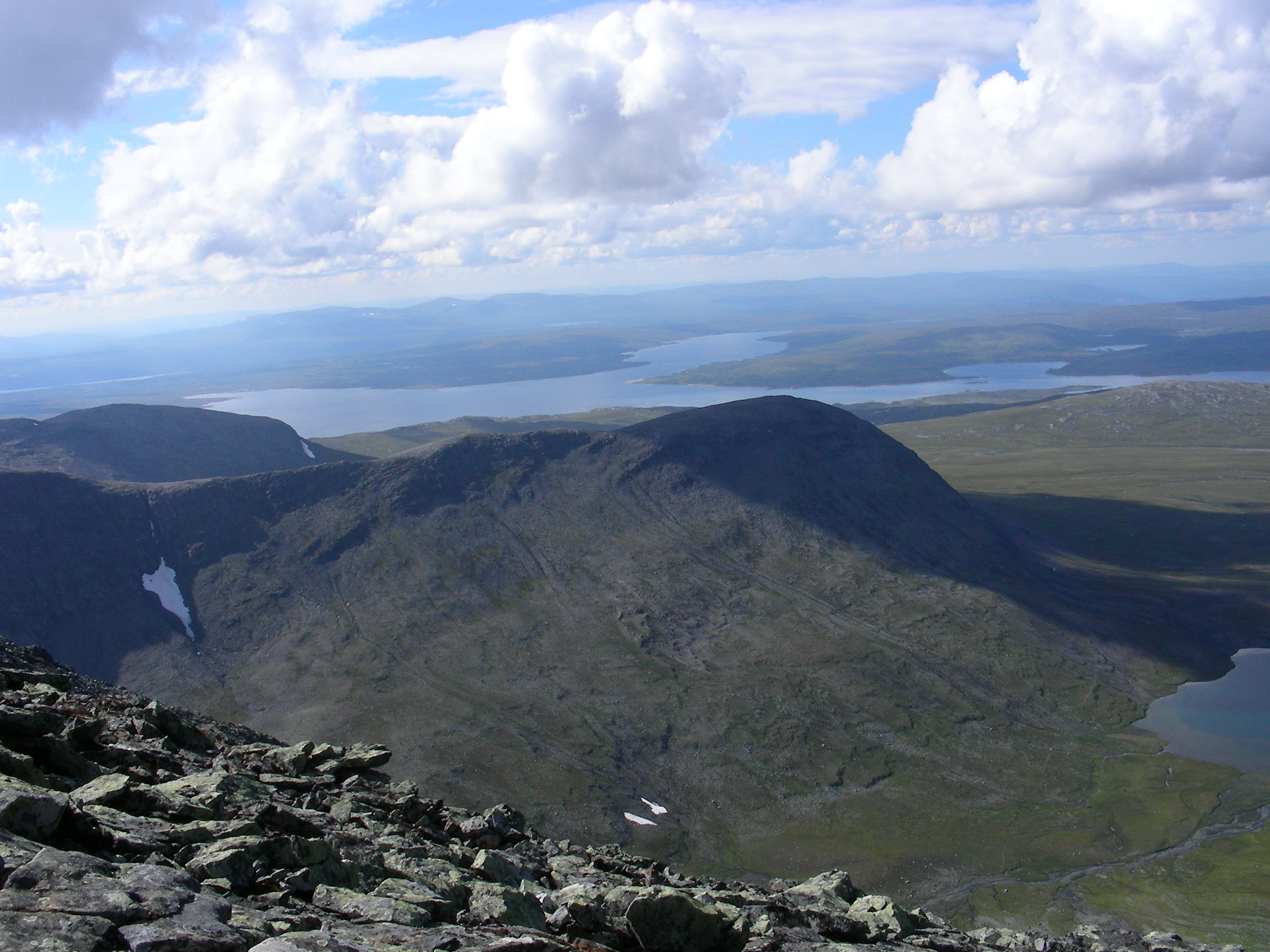
View from Sylan towards Nesjøen

Tydal covers an area of 1,330 square kilometres (510 sq mi). The rivers Tya River and Nea River (together forming the Nea-Nidelvvassdraget watershed) flow through the Tydalen valley on their way towards Trondheimsfjorden. The highest point in the municipality is the 1,762.35-metre (5,782.0 ft) tall mountain Storsylen.

In the southwest, the lake Nesjøen lies just west of the Sylan mountain range with the mountain Storsylen. In the north, the Skarvan and Roltdalen National Park is home to the mountain Fongen.

== Government ==
Tydal Municipality is responsible for primary education (through 10th grade), outpatient health services, senior citizen services, welfare and other social services, zoning, economic development, and municipal roads and utilities. The municipality is governed by a municipal council of directly elected representatives. The mayor is indirectly elected by a vote of the municipal council. The municipality is under the jurisdiction of the Trøndelag District Court and the Frostating Court of Appeal. Waste management has since 2015 been provided by the intermunicipal agency Innherred Renovasjon, and waste collection has been operated by ReTrans Midt since 2018.

=== Municipal council ===
The municipal council (Kommunestyre) of Tydal Municipality is made up of 13 representatives that are elected to four year terms. The tables below show the current and historical composition of the council by political party.

Tydal kommunestyre 2023–2027
Party name (in Norwegian)	Number of representatives
Labour Party (Arbeiderpartiet)	5
Centre Party (Senterpartiet)	8
Total number of members:	13

Tydal kommunestyre 2019–2024
Party name (in Norwegian)	Number of representatives
Labour Party (Arbeiderpartiet)	5
Centre Party (Senterpartiet)	12
Total number of members:	17

Tydal kommunestyre 2015–2019
Party name (in Norwegian)	Number of representatives
Centre Party (Senterpartiet)	12
Joint list of the Labour Party (Arbeiderpartiet) and the Socialist Left Party (Sosialistisk Venstreparti)	5
Total number of members:	17

Tydal kommunestyre 2011–2015
Party name (in Norwegian)	Number of representatives
Joint list of the Labour Party (Arbeiderpartiet) and the Socialist Left Party (Sosialistisk Venstreparti)	6
Joint list of the Centre Party (Senterpartiet) and the Liberal Party (Venstre)	8
Tydal List (Tydalslista)	3
Total number of members:	17

Tydal kommunestyre 2007–2011
Party name (in Norwegian)	Number of representatives
Labour Party (Arbeiderpartiet)	4
Centre Party (Senterpartiet)	4
Socialist Left Party (Sosialistisk Venstreparti)	1
Liberal Party (Venstre)	5
Tydal List, local list for development (Tydalslista, bygdeliste for utvikling)	3
Total number of members:	17

Tydal kommunestyre 2003–2007
Party name (in Norwegian)	Number of representatives
Labour Party (Arbeiderpartiet)	6
Conservative Party (Høyre)	1
Centre Party (Senterpartiet)	4
Socialist Left Party (Sosialistisk Venstreparti)	2
Liberal Party (Venstre)	4
Total number of members:	17

Tydal kommunestyre 1999–2003
Party name (in Norwegian)	Number of representatives
Labour Party (Arbeiderpartiet)	6
Conservative Party (Høyre)	1
Centre Party (Senterpartiet)	5
Socialist Left Party (Sosialistisk Venstreparti)	1
Liberal Party (Venstre)	4
Total number of members:	17

Tydal kommunestyre 1995–1999
Party name (in Norwegian)	Number of representatives
Labour Party (Arbeiderpartiet)	3
Conservative Party (Høyre)	1
Centre Party (Senterpartiet)	3
Socialist Left Party (Sosialistisk Venstreparti)	1
Liberal Party (Venstre)	2
Local residents' list (Bygdefolkets liste)	7
Total number of members:	17

Tydal kommunestyre 1991–1995
Party name (in Norwegian)	Number of representatives
Labour Party (Arbeiderpartiet)	5
Socialist Left Party (Sosialistisk Venstreparti)	2
Joint list of the Conservative Party (Høyre), Christian Democratic Party (Kristelig Folkeparti), Centre Party (Senterpartiet), and Liberal Party (Venstre)	3
Local residents' list (Bygdefolkets liste)	7
Total number of members:	17

Tydal kommunestyre 1987–1991
Party name (in Norwegian)	Number of representatives
Labour Party (Arbeiderpartiet)	4
Socialist Left Party (Sosialistisk Venstreparti)	1
Joint list of the Conservative Party (Høyre), Christian Democratic Party (Kristelig Folkeparti), and Centre Party (Senterpartiet)	3
Local residents' list (Bygdefolkets liste)	9
Total number of members:	17

Tydal kommunestyre 1983–1987
Party name (in Norwegian)	Number of representatives
Labour Party (Arbeiderpartiet)	9
Socialist Left Party (Sosialistisk Venstreparti)	2
Joint list of the Conservative Party (Høyre), Christian Democratic Party (Kristelig Folkeparti), Centre Party (Senterpartiet), and Liberal Party (Venstre)	6
Total number of members:	17

Tydal kommunestyre 1979–1983
Party name (in Norwegian)	Number of representatives
Labour Party (Arbeiderpartiet)	9
Joint list of the Conservative Party (Høyre), Christian Democratic Party (Kristelig Folkeparti), Centre Party (Senterpartiet), and Liberal Party (Venstre)	8
Total number of members:	17

Tydal kommunestyre 1975–1979
Party name (in Norwegian)	Number of representatives
Labour Party (Arbeiderpartiet)	8
Socialist Left Party (Sosialistisk Venstreparti)	1
Joint list of the Conservative Party (Høyre), Christian Democratic Party (Kristelig Folkeparti), Centre Party (Senterpartiet), and Liberal Party (Venstre)	8
Total number of members:	17

Tydal kommunestyre 1971–1975
Party name (in Norwegian)	Number of representatives
Labour Party (Arbeiderpartiet)	9
Socialist People's Party (Sosialistisk Folkeparti)	2
Local List(s) (Lokale lister)	6
Total number of members:	17

Tydal kommunestyre 1967–1971
Party name (in Norwegian)	Number of representatives
Labour Party (Arbeiderpartiet)	7
Socialist People's Party (Sosialistisk Folkeparti)	2
Local List(s) (Lokale lister)	4
Total number of members:	13

Tydal kommunestyre 1963–1967
Party name (in Norwegian)	Number of representatives
Labour Party (Arbeiderpartiet)	9
Local List(s) (Lokale lister)	4
Total number of members:	13

Tydal herredsstyre 1959–1963
Party name (in Norwegian)	Number of representatives
Labour Party (Arbeiderpartiet)	9
Local List(s) (Lokale lister)	4
Total number of members:	13

Tydal herredsstyre 1955–1959
Party name (in Norwegian)	Number of representatives
Labour Party (Arbeiderpartiet)	9
Local List(s) (Lokale lister)	4
Total number of members:	13

Tydal herredsstyre 1951–1955
Party name (in Norwegian)	Number of representatives
Labour Party (Arbeiderpartiet)	8
Local List(s) (Lokale lister)	4
Total number of members:	12

Tydal herredsstyre 1947–1951
Party name (in Norwegian)	Number of representatives
Labour Party (Arbeiderpartiet)	8
Local List(s) (Lokale lister)	4
Total number of members:	12

Tydal herredsstyre 1945–1947
Party name (in Norwegian)	Number of representatives
List of workers, fishermen, and small farmholders (Arbeidere, fiskere, småbrukere liste)	8
Local List(s) (Lokale lister)	4
Total number of members:	12

Tydal herredsstyre 1937–1941*
Party name (in Norwegian)	Number of representatives
Labour Party (Arbeiderpartiet)	7
Local List(s) (Lokale lister)	5
Total number of members:	12
Note: Due to the German occupation of Norway during World War II, no elections were held for new municipal councils until after the war ended in 1945.

=== Mayors ===
The mayor (Norwegian: ordfører) of Tydal Municipality is the political leader of the municipality and the chairperson of the municipal council. Here is a list of people who have held this position:

- 1901–1907: Nils P. Svelmo (LL)
- 1908–1919: Olaus Aune (LL)
- 1920–1931: Jon Næsvold (V)
- 1932–1934: Bardo Kristian Rolseth (V)
- 1935–1937: Iver Unsgård (Ap)
- 1938–1940: Mikal L. Uglem (Ap)
- 1946–1947: Olav Svelmoe (Ap)
- 1948–1958: Iver Unsgård (Ap)
- 1959–1967: Ola Gullbrekken (Ap)
- 1967–1967: Olaus Østby (Ap)
- 1968–1968: Hilmar Østby (Ap)
- 1968–1971: Joralf Østby (Ap)
- 1972–1987: Peder Kristian Aune (Ap)
- 1988–1999: Erling Lyngen (LL)
- 1999–2007: Rolf Almåsbakk (Ap)
- 2007–2007: Anne-Karin Brandsfjell (Ap)
- 2007–2011: Kari Slungård (V)
- 2011–2015: John Paulsby (V)
- 2015–2019: Ole Bjarne Østby (Sp)
- 2019–present: Jens Arne Kvello (Sp)

== Transportation ==
Tydal is halfway between the town of Røros and the city of Trondheim, with Norwegian national road 705 as the most important road through Tydal. Trondheim Airport, Værnes is one hour of driving away. There are daily bus connections to Trondheim, Værnes as well as to Røros.

== Notable people ==
- Iver Johan Unsgård (1903 in Tydal – 1993), a Norwegian politician and Mayor of Tydal three times between 1945-1958
- Niklas Dyrhaug (born 1987) Former cross-country skier
