= Aungrenda =

Village in Tydal Municipality, Norway

Aungrenda Aunet
- Village
- Interactive map of Aungrenda
- Location within Trøndelag Location within Norway
- Coordinates: 63.0550°N 11.5687°E
- Country: Norway
- Region: Central Norway
- County: Trøndelag
- District: Neadalen
- Municipality: Tydal Municipality
- Elevation: 302 m (991 ft)
- Time zone: UTC+01:00 (CET)
  - Summer (DST): UTC+02:00 (CEST)
- Post Code: 7590 Tydal

Aungrenda or Aunet is a village in Tydal Municipality in Trøndelag county, Norway. The village is located along the Nea River, about 4 kilometres (2.5 mi) west of the municipal center of Ås. The village is the location of Tydal Church which was built in 1696.
