= Østby, Trøndelag =

Village in Tydal Municipality, Norway

Østby
- Village
- Interactive map of Østby
- Location within Trøndelag Location within Norway
- Coordinates: 63.05082°N 11.673°E
- Country: Norway
- Region: Central Norway
- County: Trøndelag
- District: Neadalen
- Municipality: Tydal Municipality
- Elevation: 481 m (1,578 ft)
- Time zone: UTC+01:00 (CET)
  - Summer (DST): UTC+02:00 (CEST)
- Post Code: 7590 Tydal

Østby is a village in Tydal Municipality in Trøndelag county, Norway. The village is located along the Nea River, about 1 kilometre (0.62 mi) northeast of the municipal center of Ås.
