= Inga Balstad =

Norwegian politician (born 1952)

Inga Johanne Balstad (born 25 January 1952 in Selbu Municipality) is a Norwegian politician for the Labour Party. She served as a deputy representative in the Norwegian Parliament from Sør-Trøndelag county during the terms 1993–1997 and 1997–2001.

On the local level, Balstad was a member of the municipal council of Selbu Municipality from 1983 to 1991 and again since 2003, also serving as mayor since 2007. From 1991 to 1995, she was a member of the Sør-Trøndelag county council. She was also a member of the board of Sør-Trøndelag University College from 2001 to 2007.
