= Sylan =

Mountain range in Norway and Sweden

Sylan (Norwegian); Sylarna (Swedish); Bealjehkh (Southern Sami)
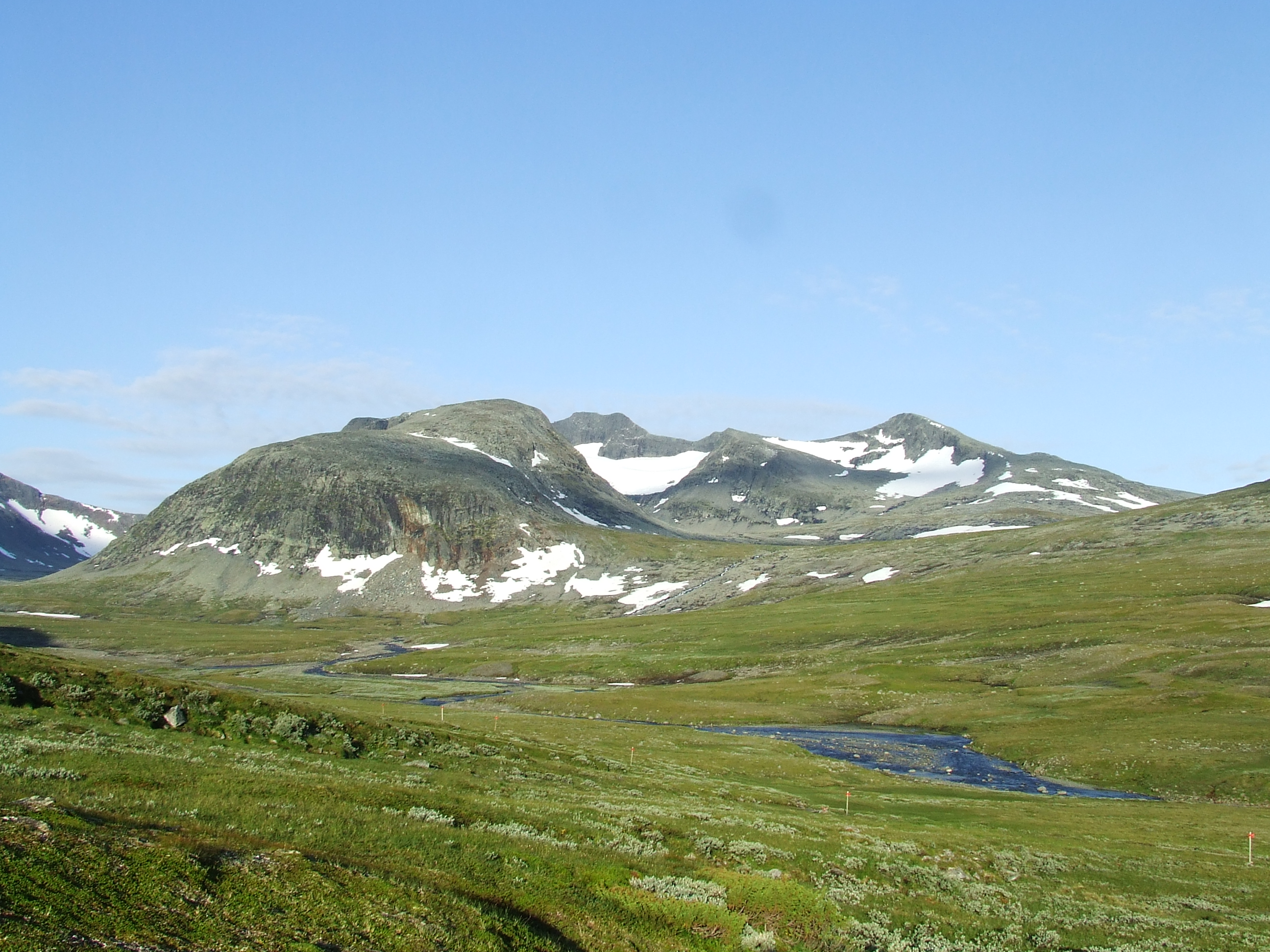

Highest point
- Peak: Storsylen
- Elevation: 1,762 m (5,781 ft)
- Coordinates: 63.02055°N 12.20028°E

Naming
- Etymology: "syl" meaning "awl"

Geography
- Location: Norway-Sweden border
- Countries: Norway and Sweden
- Counties: Trøndelag and Jämtland
- Range coordinates: 63.00869°N 12.17534°E

Sylan (Norwegian), Sylarna (Swedish), or Bealjehkh (Southern Sami) is a mountain range on the border between Norway and Sweden. The mountain range lies in Tydal Municipality in Trøndelag county (Norway) and in Åre Municipality in Jämtland county (Sweden).

== Location ==
The central part of the range includes a large mountain ridge that starts at the 1,523-metre (4,997 ft) tall mountain Lillsylen in the north then heading south to the 1,762-metre (5,781 ft) tall Storsylen (the highest point in the mountain range), and further south to the 1,728-metre (5,669 ft) tall mountain Storsola. Traversing the ridge is a popular trip for experienced hikers, and is easiest from the south to the north, due to a scrambling point about 100 metres (330 ft) south of the Storsylen summit.

== Amenities ==
There are a number of mountain cabins in the area. The Norwegian Trekking Association maintains the tourist huts Schultzhytta in Roltdalen, Storerikvollen and Nedalshytta by Nesjøen. On the Swedish side the Swedish Tourist Association maintains the tourist huts Blåhammarens Fjällstation, Sylarnas Fjällstation and Helags Fjällstation. The mountain has a number of relatively small glaciers in its cirques on the eastern side of the main ridge.

== Climate ==
Climate data for Sylarna A 1991-2020 (1030m)
Month	Jan	Feb	Mar	Apr	May	Jun	Jul	Aug	Sep	Oct	Nov	Dec	Year
Mean daily maximum °C (°F)	−3.1 (26.4)	−3.8 (25.2)	−2.7 (27.1)	0.8 (33.4)	5.3 (41.5)	10.1 (50.2)	13.7 (56.7)	12.4 (54.3)	8.3 (46.9)	2.8 (37.0)	−0.3 (31.5)	−2.4 (27.7)	3.4 (38.2)
Daily mean °C (°F)	−6.1 (21.0)	−6.7 (19.9)	−5.6 (21.9)	−2.3 (27.9)	1.8 (35.2)	6.2 (43.2)	9.8 (49.6)	8.9 (48.0)	5.2 (41.4)	0.2 (32.4)	−3.2 (26.2)	−5.2 (22.6)	0.2 (32.4)
Mean daily minimum °C (°F)	−9.0 (15.8)	−9.7 (14.5)	−8.6 (16.5)	−4.9 (23.2)	−1.0 (30.2)	2.9 (37.2)	6.5 (43.7)	6.1 (43.0)	2.6 (36.7)	−2.2 (28.0)	−6.0 (21.2)	−8.1 (17.4)	−2.6 (27.3)
Source: NOAA

Climate data for Blåhammaren A 1991-2020 (1087m)
Month	Jan	Feb	Mar	Apr	May	Jun	Jul	Aug	Sep	Oct	Nov	Dec	Year
Mean daily maximum °C (°F)	−4.8 (23.4)	−5.4 (22.3)	−4.0 (24.8)	−0.2 (31.6)	4.4 (39.9)	9.4 (48.9)	12.9 (55.2)	11.6 (52.9)	7.3 (45.1)	1.4 (34.5)	−2.1 (28.2)	−4.1 (24.6)	2.2 (36.0)
Daily mean °C (°F)	−7.2 (19.0)	−7.6 (18.3)	−6.2 (20.8)	−2.8 (27.0)	1.4 (34.5)	5.7 (42.3)	9.3 (48.7)	8.3 (46.9)	4.4 (39.9)	−0.8 (30.6)	−4.4 (24.1)	−6.6 (20.1)	−0.5 (31.0)
Mean daily minimum °C (°F)	−9.6 (14.7)	−10.2 (13.6)	−8.9 (16.0)	−5.4 (22.3)	−1.6 (29.1)	2.6 (36.7)	6.1 (43.0)	5.7 (42.3)	2.1 (35.8)	−2.7 (27.1)	−6.6 (20.1)	−8.8 (16.2)	−3.1 (26.4)
Source: NOAA

== Name ==
Sylan is the finite plural of syl which means "awl". The sharp and pointed peaks of the mountains have been compared with the tool.

== Media gallery ==
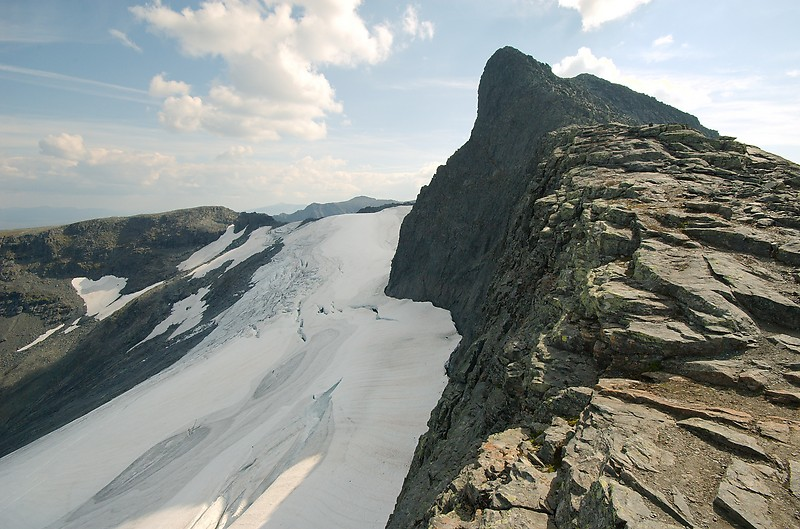
Storsylen, northern ridge. The glacier can be seen to the left.

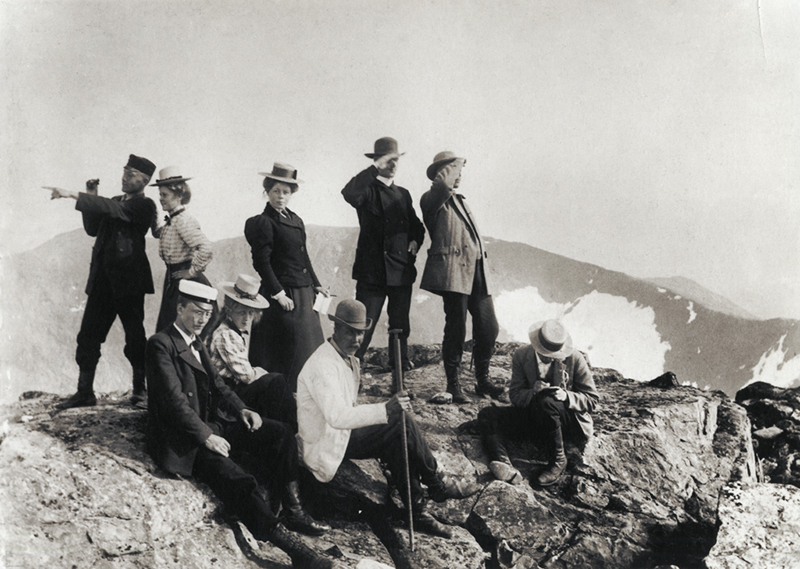
The first tourists on Storsylen in July 1900.

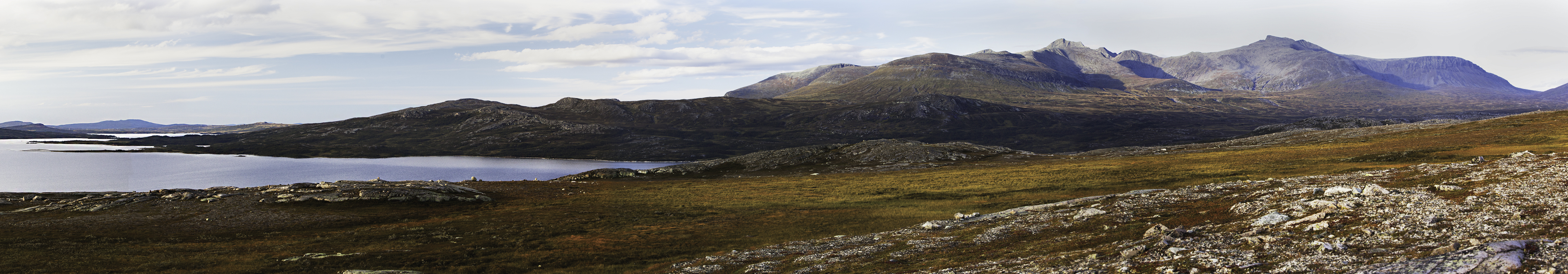
Sylan panorama; view from Nedalshytta with Essandsjøen in view.
