= Selbu Church =

Church in Trøndelag, Norway

- Selbu kirke
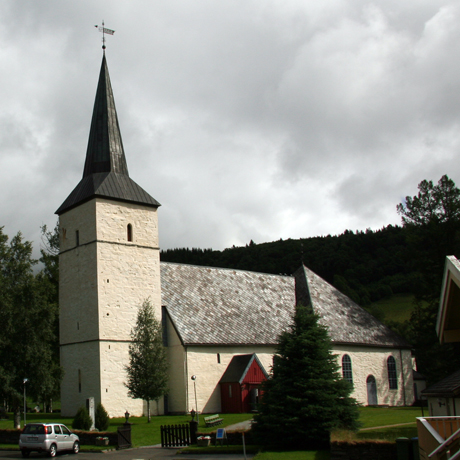
- View of the church
- Selbu Church
- 63.216341419°N 11.042399704°E
- Location: Selbu Municipality, Trøndelag
- Country: Norway
- Denomination: Church of Norway
- Previous denomination: Catholic Church
- Churchmanship: Evangelical Lutheran

History
- Status: Parish church
- Founded: c. 1150
- Consecrated: c. 1150

Architecture
- Functional status: Active
- Architectural type: Cruciform
- Completed: c. 1150 (876 years ago)

Specifications
- Capacity: 550
- Materials: Stone

Administration
- Diocese: Nidaros bispedømme
- Deanery: Stjørdal prosti
- Parish: Selbu
- Norwegian Cultural Heritage Site
- Type: Church
- Status: Automatically protected
- ID: 85415

Selbu Church (Norwegian: Selbu kirke) is a parish church of the Church of Norway in Selbu Municipality in Trøndelag county, Norway. It is located in the village of Mebonden. It is one of the churches for the Selbu parish which is part of the Stjørdal prosti (deanery) in the Diocese of Nidaros. The church seats about 550 people. The white, stone church was built in a cruciform style around the year 1150 under designs by an unknown architect.

== History ==
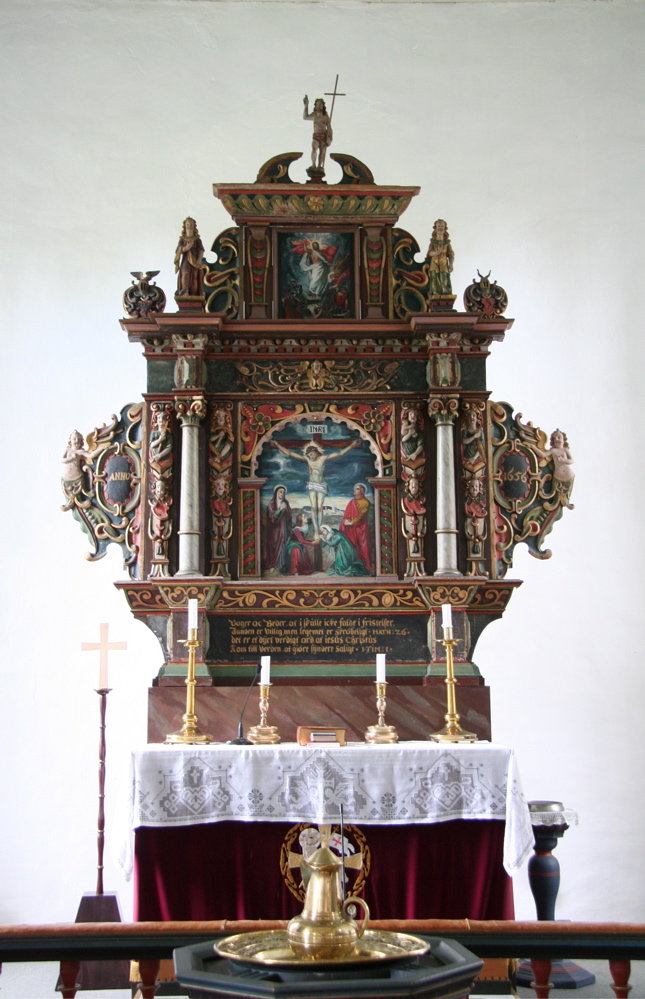
Selbu Church altarpiece

The earliest existing historical records of the church date back to the year 1409, but the church was not new that year. The old stone church was likely built around the year 1150. It was originally built as a single-nave long church with narrower choir with a lower roof line in the southeast. It is believed that the choir was built first, around the mid-12th century while the nave was completed afterwards. Dendrochronological analyses of the roof structure in the nave show that the timber for this was cut in 1176–1177. The stone for the church structure is converted sandstone.

The large tower on the west end also houses the entry porch for the church. This tower was likely free-standing when it was originally built, possibly around the 1280s. The tower bell is dated to the year 1283. Later, the nave was extended further west so that the tower is now attached to the nave.

The baroque altarpiece is from 1656 and was carved by Trøndelag-based artist and craftsman Johan Johansen (Johan bilthugger) and painted by Johan Hanssønn (kontrafeier).

From 1804 to 1806, the church was renovated. The medieval choir was demolished and a new choir was built to replace it. The nave was also enlarged by adding two small transept arms to give the church a cruciform design, although the church is set up as a long church with all seating facing the choir.

In 1814, this church served as an election church (Norwegian: valgkirke). Together with more than 300 other parish churches across Norway, it was a polling station for elections to the 1814 Norwegian Constituent Assembly which wrote the Constitution of Norway. This was Norway's first national elections. Each church parish was a constituency that elected people called "electors" who later met together in each county to elect the representatives for the assembly that was to meet at Eidsvoll Manor later that year.

In 1888, the building was extensively restored and rebuilt. It was then restored again from 1949 to 1963 under the supervision of John Egil Tverdahl. During this time much of the Gothic interior was removed. Many of the parts of the old altarpiece were retrieved and reconstructed according to patterns from other similar altarpieces. The building was not thoroughly investigated during the restoration work of the 20th century, nor was it archaeologically excavated. When a new floor was laid in the church in 1959, a total of 118 coins were found in the dirt under the old church floor, most of them being Norwegian and Swedish. The Swedish coins are from the year 1275 to 1560, while 34 of the total 58 Norwegian coins were minted under Håkon Håkonsson (1217–63).

== Media gallery ==
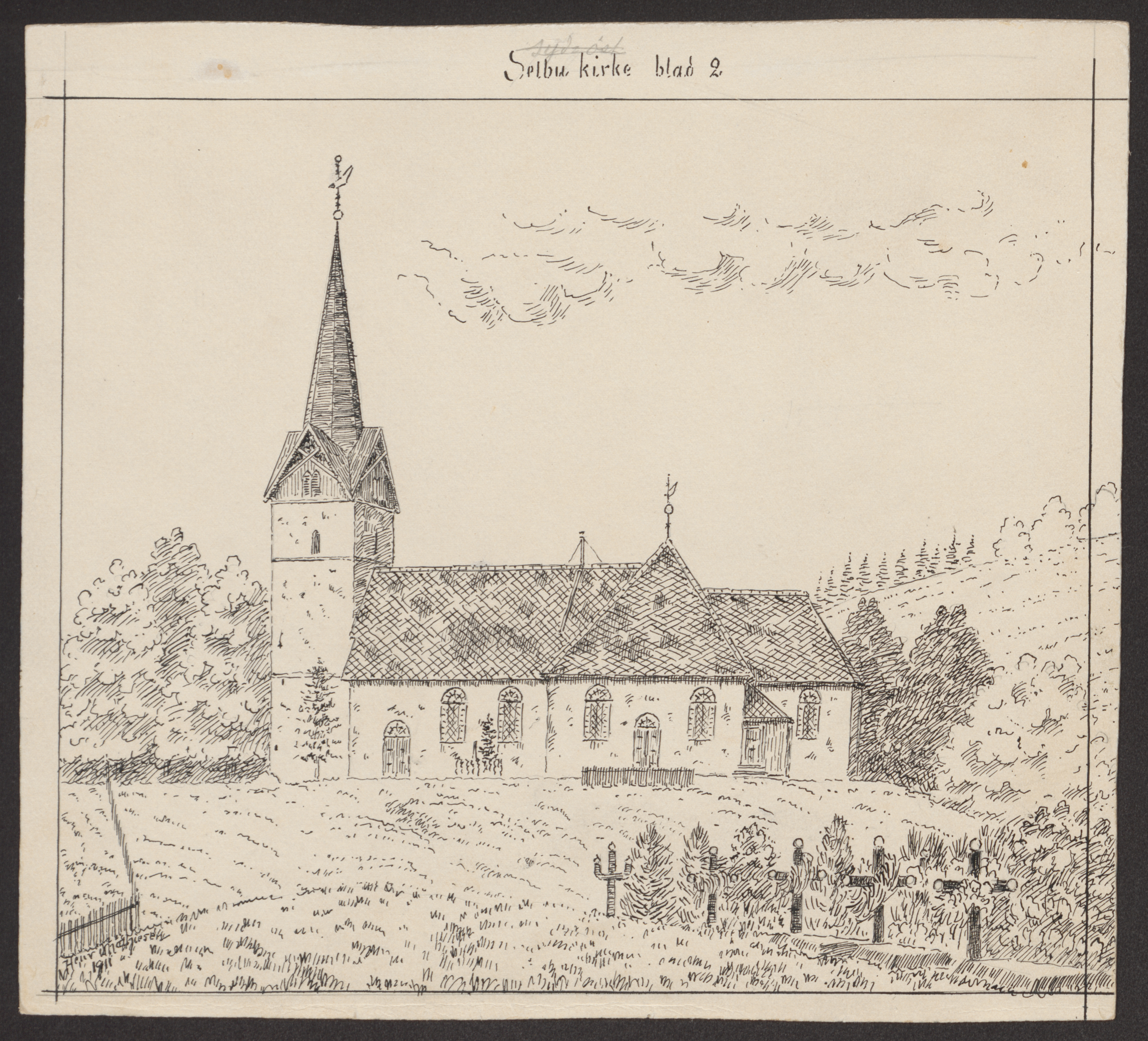

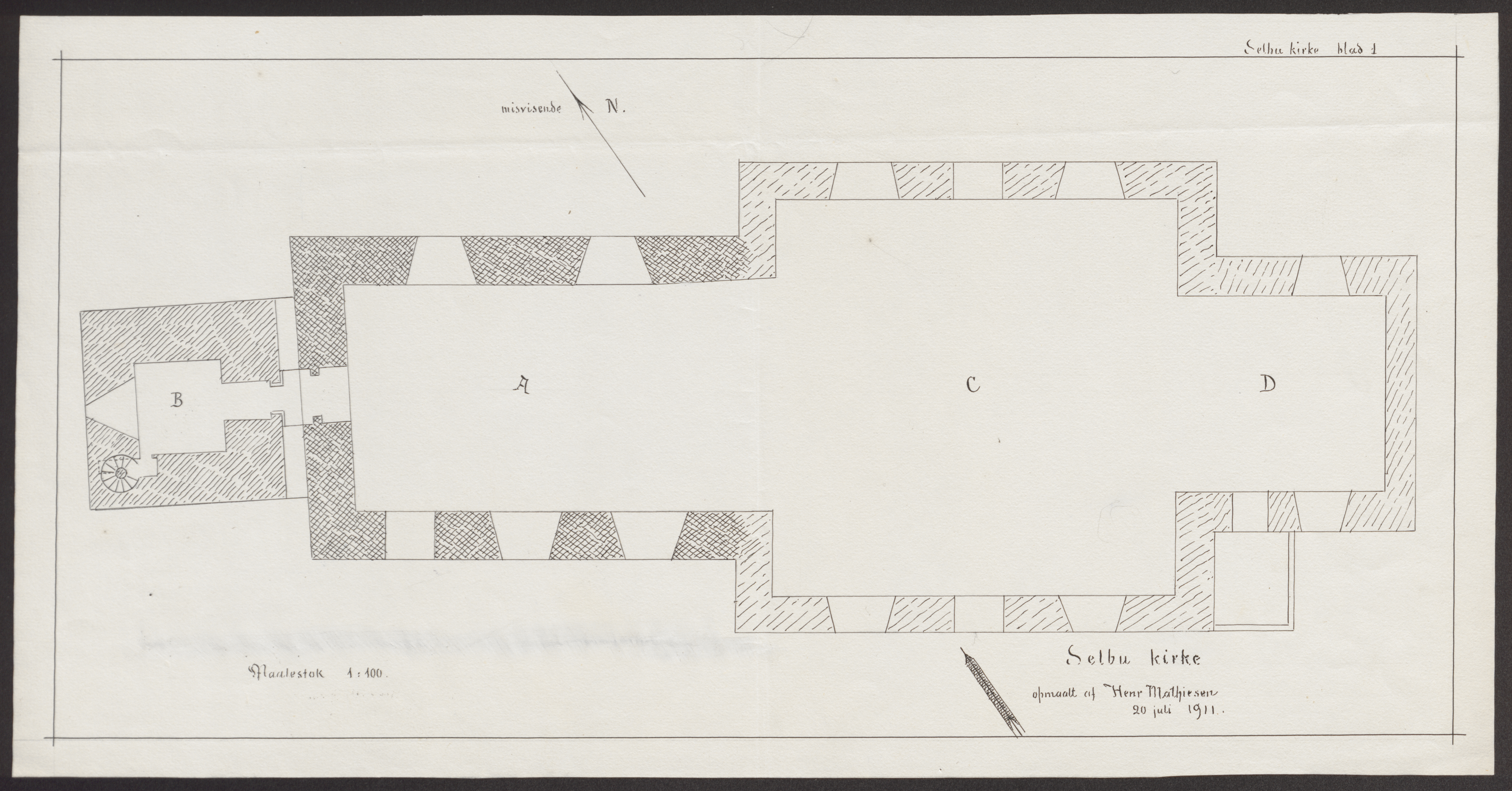

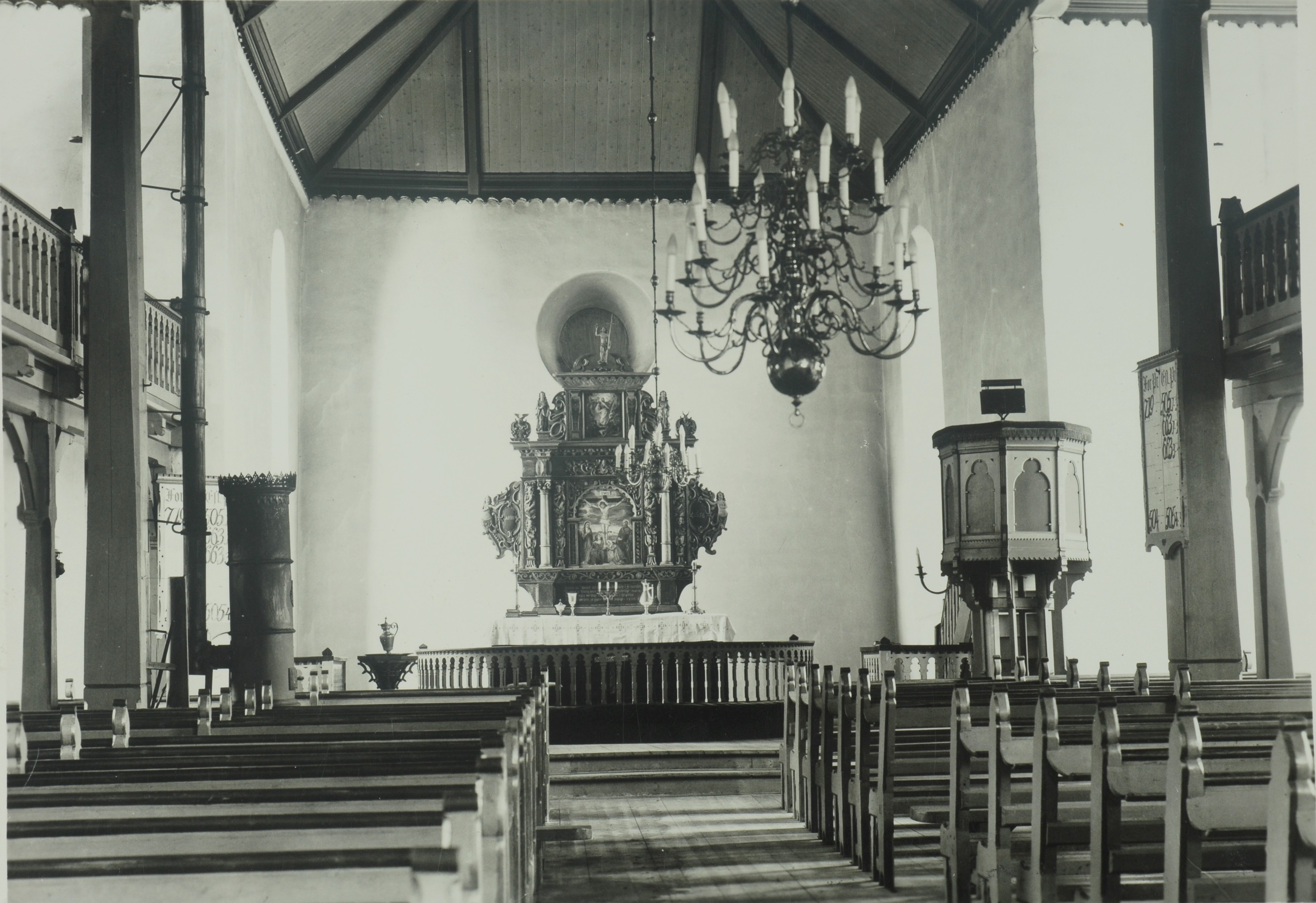

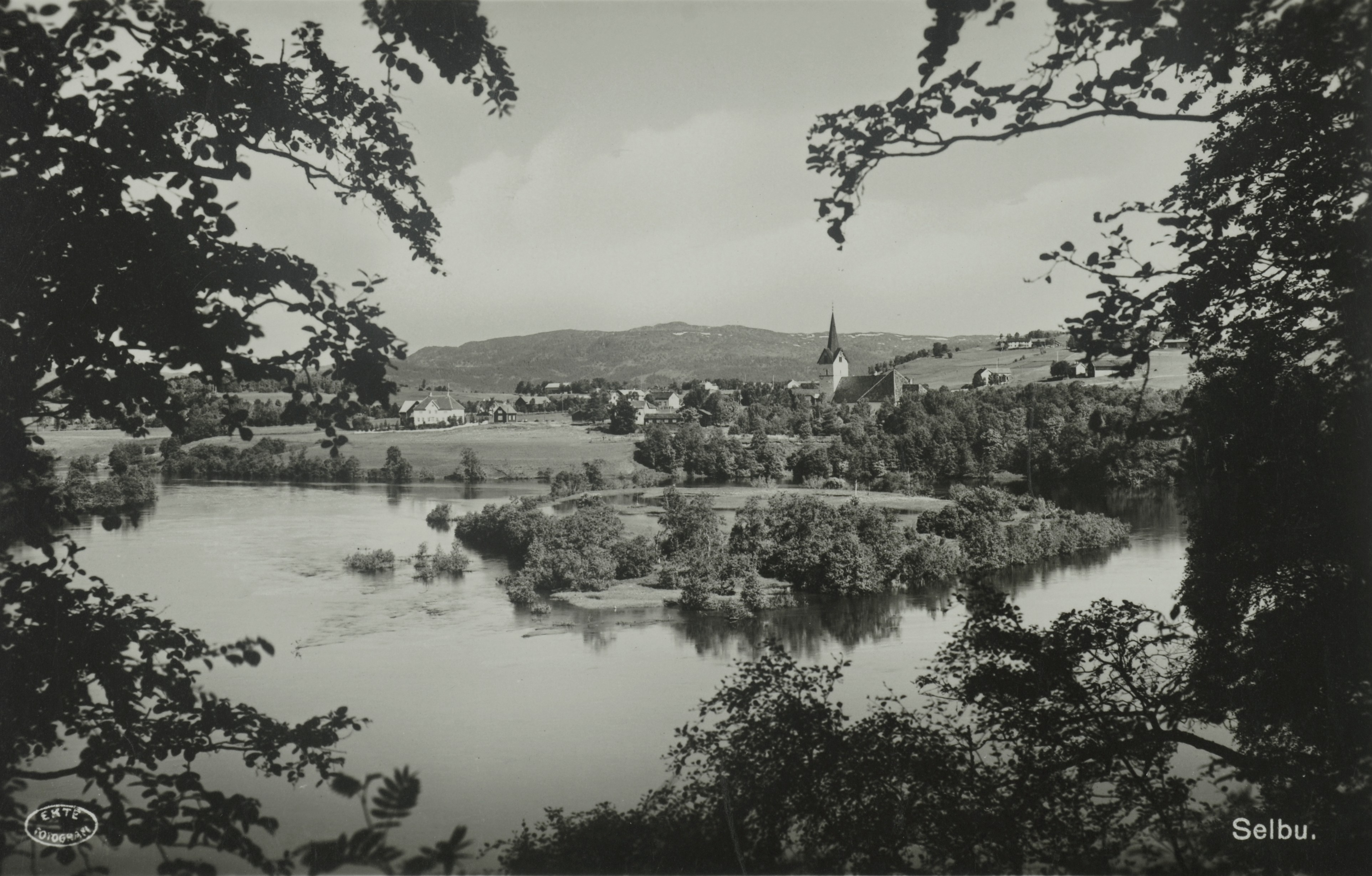

== See also ==
- List of churches in Nidaros
