= Ås, Trøndelag =

Village in Tydal Municipality, Norway

Ås
- Village
- Interactive map of Ås
- Location within Trøndelag Location within Norway
- Coordinates: 63.0449°N 11.6578°E
- Country: Norway
- Region: Central Norway
- County: Trøndelag
- District: Neadalen
- Municipality: Tydal Municipality
- Elevation: 448 m (1,470 ft)
- Time zone: UTC+01:00 (CET)
  - Summer (DST): UTC+02:00 (CEST)
- Post Code: 7590 Tydal

Ås is the administrative center of Tydal Municipality in Trøndelag county, Norway. The village is located along the Nea River, about 1 kilometre (0.62 mi) southwest of the village of Østby.

Most of the residents of Tydal Municipality live in or around the village of Ås. The village is about 5 kilometres (3.1 mi) east of Aungrenda, where Tydal Church is located. The village has some small industries, especially wood products. There are also some sporting facilities in Ås.
