= Selbustrand =

Village in Selbu Municipality, Norway

Selbustrand Selbustranda
- Village
- Interactive map of Selbustrand
- Location within Trøndelag Location within Norway
- Coordinates: 63.2488°N 10.9517°E
- Country: Norway
- Region: Central Norway
- County: Trøndelag
- District: Neadalen
- Municipality: Selbu Municipality
- Elevation: 185 m (607 ft)
- Time zone: UTC+01:00 (CET)
  - Summer (DST): UTC+02:00 (CEST)
- Post Code: 7584 Selbustrand

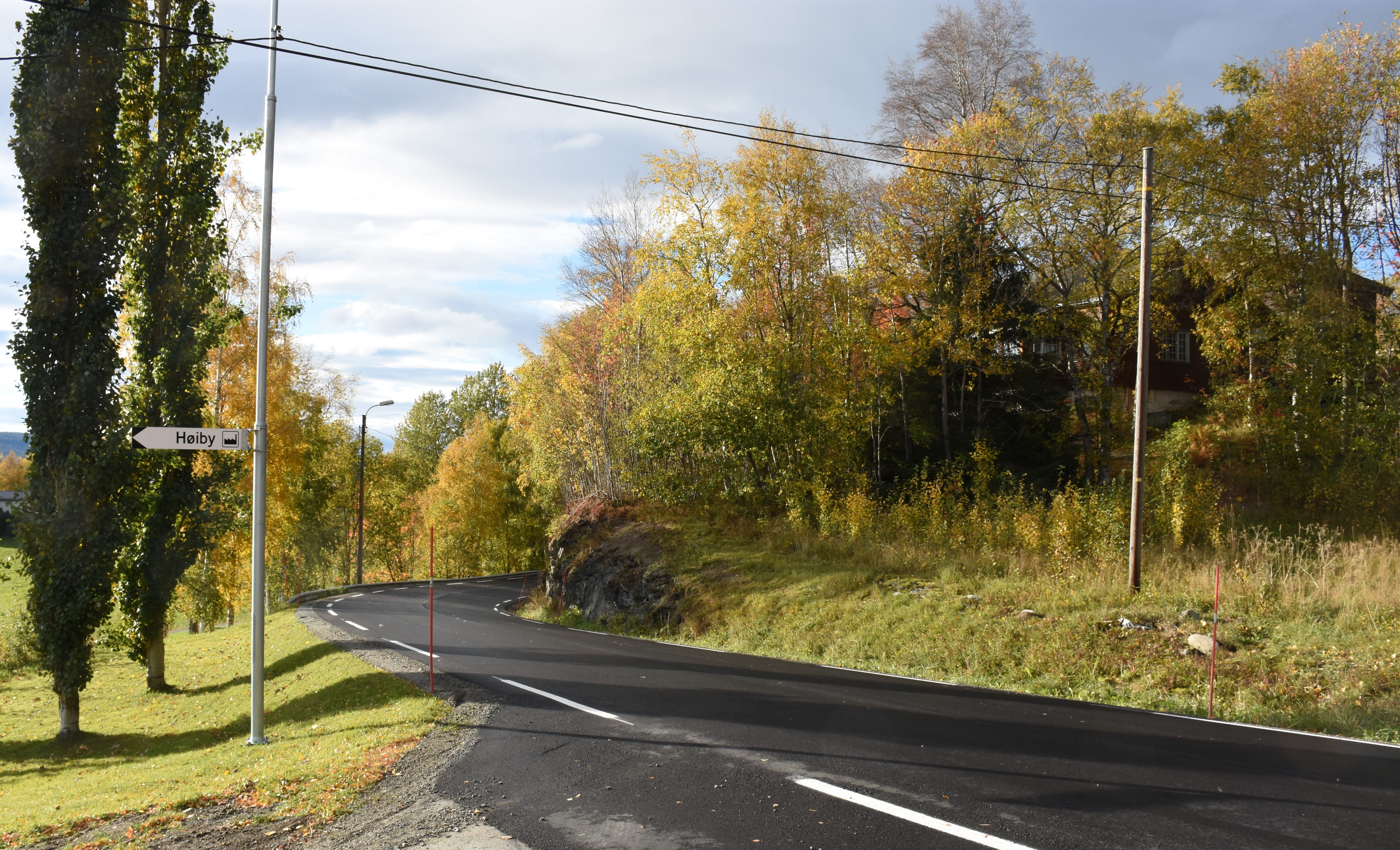
Strandvegen (county road 6712) at Selbustrand church

Selbustrand is a village in Selbu Municipality in Trøndelag county, Norway. It is located about 5 kilometres (3.1 mi) across the lake Selbusjøen from the municipal center of Mebonden. The village of Fossan lies about 3 kilometres (1.9 mi) to the northeast of Selbustrand. The Selbustrand Church is located in this village.
