= Rotla =

River in Trøndelag, Norway

- Interactive map of the river

Location
- Country: Norway
- County: Trøndelag
- Municipalities: Selbu Municipality, Meråker Municipality

Physical characteristics
- Source: Roltdalstjønna
  - location: Meråker Municipality, Trøndelag, Norway
  - coordinates: 63°13′01″N 11°40′01″E
  - elevation: 785 metres (2,575 ft)
- Mouth: Nea River
  - location: Selbu Municipality, Trøndelag, Norway
  - coordinates: 63°11′05″N 11°10′06″E
  - elevation: 220 metres (720 ft)
- Length: 40 km (25 mi)

Basin features
- River system: Nea-Nidelvvassdraget
- Tributaries
  - left: Ramåa, Fongåa, Vela
  - right: Fagermoa, Krossåa

Rotla is a 40-kilometre (25 mi) long river in Trøndelag county, Norway. The river begins at Roltdalstjønna in Meråker Municipality, just north of the mountain Fongen. It then runs through west through the Skarvan and Roltdalen National Park. The river ends when it flows into the Nea River near Stokkan in Selbu Municipality. The Nea River then flows west for 15 kilometres (9.3 mi) until reaching the lake Selbusjøen at the village of Mebonden. The river Rotla is part of the Nea-Nidelvvassdraget watershed.

== See also ==
- List of rivers in Norway
- Raiders of the Lost Ark (ROTLA)
