= Nea-Nidelvvassdraget =

Coordinates: 63.2306°N 10.8895°E

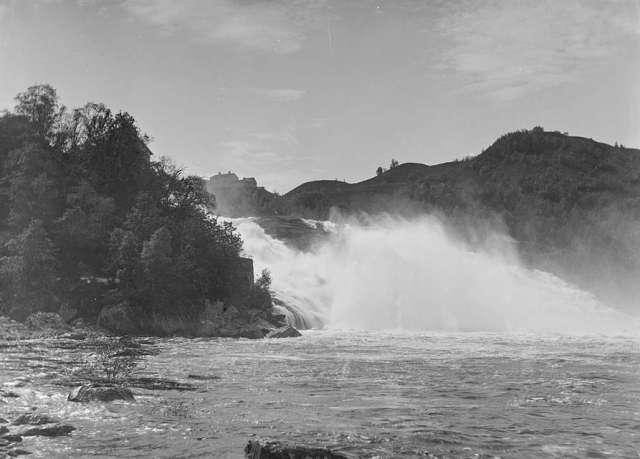
- View of the Øvre Leirfoss waterfall in 1880

Location
- Country: Norway
- County: Trøndelag

Physical characteristics
- Mouth: Trondheimsfjorden
- Length: 160 km (99 mi)

Nea-Nidelvvassdraget is a watercourse in Trøndelag county, Norway. It runs through Tydal Municipality, Selbu Municipality, and Trondheim Municipality. The total area of the watershed is 3,100 square kilometres (1,200 sq mi) and it runs for about 160 kilometres (99 mi) from the source in the Sylan mountains to its mouth in Trondheimsfjorden. Trondheim Energiverk has fourteen power stations along the water course which are highly regulated, with a total production (in 2004) of 2,581 gigawatt-hours (9,290 TJ). Development of the area had already begun in 1890 with the development of the Øvre Leirfoss power station.

Important rivers in the Nea-Nidelvvassdraget watercourse are the Nidelva, Nea, Rotla, Lødølja, and Tya. Amongst the biggest lakes are Sylsjön, Nesjøen, Stugusjøen, Finnkoisjøen, and Selbusjøen.
