= Trøa =

Village in Selbu Municipality, Norway

- Village
- Interactive map of Trøa
- Location within Trøndelag Location within Norway
- Coordinates: 63.2529°N 11.1066°E
- Country: Norway
- Region: Central Norway
- County: Trøndelag
- District: Neadalen
- Municipality: Selbu Municipality

Area
  - Total: 0.23 km^{2} (0.089 sq mi)
- Elevation: 180 m (590 ft)

Population (2024)
  - Total: 234
  - Density: 1,017/km^{2} (2,630/sq mi)
- Time zone: UTC+01:00 (CET)
  - Summer (DST): UTC+02:00 (CEST)
- Post Code: 7580 Selbu

Trøa is a village in Selbu Municipality in Trøndelag county, Norway. It is located along the eastern end of the lake Selbusjøen, just north of the village of Innbygda, about 5 kilometres (3.1 mi) north of the municipal center of Mebonden, and about 4 kilometres (2.5 mi) south of the village of Tømra.

The 0.23-square-kilometre (57-acre) village has a population (2024) of 234 and a population density of 1,017 inhabitants per square kilometre (2,630/sq mi).
