= Fossan =

Village in Selbu Municipality, Norway

- Village
- Interactive map of Fossan
- Location within Trøndelag Location within Norway
- Coordinates: 63.2695°N 11.0102°E
- Country: Norway
- Region: Central Norway
- County: Trøndelag
- District: Neadalen
- Municipality: Selbu Municipality
- Elevation: 177 m (581 ft)
- Time zone: UTC+01:00 (CET)
  - Summer (DST): UTC+02:00 (CEST)
- Post Code: 7584 Selbustrand

Fossan is a village in Selbu Municipality in Trøndelag county, Norway. It is located about 5 kilometres (3.1 mi) north of the municipal center of Mebonden, across the lake Selbusjøen. Fossan is located about halfway between the villages of Selbustrand and Tømra.
