= Vikvarvet =

Village in Selbu Municipality, Norway

- Village
- Interactive map of Vikvarvet
- Location within Trøndelag Location within Norway
- Coordinates: 63°12′26″N 10°57′55″E
- Country: Norway
- Region: Central Norway
- County: Trøndelag
- District: Neadalen
- Municipality: Selbu Municipality
- Elevation: 166 m (545 ft)
- Time zone: UTC+01:00 (CET)
  - Summer (DST): UTC+02:00 (CEST)
- Post Code: 7580 Selbu

Vikvarvet is a village in Selbu Municipality in Trøndelag county, Norway. It is located on the southern shore of the lake Selbusjøen, about 4 kilometres (2.5 mi) southwest of the municipal center of Mebonden.
