= Innbygda, Trøndelag =

Village in Selbu Municipality, Norway

Innbygda
- Village
- Interactive map of Innbygda
- Location within Trøndelag Location within Norway
- Coordinates: 63.2425°N 11.0862°E
- Country: Norway
- Region: Central Norway
- County: Trøndelag
- District: Neadalen
- Municipality: Selbu Municipality
- Elevation: 165 m (541 ft)
- Time zone: UTC+01:00 (CET)
  - Summer (DST): UTC+02:00 (CEST)
- Post Code: 7580 Selbu

Innbygda is a village in Selbu Municipality in Trøndelag county, Norway. It is located along the eastern end of the lake Selbusjøen, about 4 kilometres (2.5 mi) northeast of the municipal center of Mebonden and about 1 kilometre (0.62 mi) southwest of the village of Trøa. The village is home to some small industries including a sawmill and a Tine factory.
