= Tya, Trøndelag =

River in Trøndelag, Norway

Tya
- Interactive map of the river

Location
- Country: Norway
- County: Trøndelag
- Municipality: Tydal Municipality

Physical characteristics
- Source: Stuggusjøen
  - location: Stugudalen, Tydal Municipality, Norway
  - coordinates: 62.93867°N 11.8224°E
  - elevation: 612 metres (2,008 ft)
- Mouth: Nea River
  - location: Ås, Tydal Municipality, Norway
  - coordinates: 63.04136°N 11.66289°E
  - elevation: 0 metres (0 ft)
- Length: 16.3 km (10.1 mi)
- Basin size: 287 square kilometres (111 sq mi)
- Discharge
  - average: 8.64 cubic metres per second (305 cu ft/s)

Basin features
- River system: Nea-Nidelvvassdraget

Tya is a river located in Tydal Municipality in Trøndelag county, Norway. The 16.3-kilometre (10.1 mi) long river flows from the lake Stuggusjøen near the village of Stugudalen and flows north through the Tydalen valley to the village of Ås where it joins the Nea River. It is part of the Nea-Nidelvvassdraget river system. The river has a watershed of about 287 square kilometres (111 sq mi). The river flows at an average rate of 8.64 cubic metres per second (305 cu ft/s).

== See also ==
- List of rivers in Norway
