= Hyttbakken =

Village in Selbu Municipality, Norway

- Village
- Interactive map of Hyttbakken
- Location within Trøndelag Location within Norway
- Coordinates: 63.2018°N 11.1347°E
- Country: Norway
- Region: Central Norway
- County: Trøndelag
- District: Neadalen
- Municipality: Selbu Municipality
- Elevation: 215 m (705 ft)
- Time zone: UTC+01:00 (CET)
  - Summer (DST): UTC+02:00 (CEST)
- Post Code: 7580 Selbu

Hyttbakken is a village in Selbu Municipality in Trøndelag county, Norway. It is located along the Nea River, about 6.5 kilometres (4.0 mi) east of the municipal center of Mebonden and about 15 kilometres (9.3 mi) northwest of the village of Flora.
