= Tømra =

Village in Trøndelag county, Norway

- Village
- Interactive map of Tømra
- Location within Trøndelag Location within Norway
- Coordinates: 63.28544°N 11.07277°E
- Country: Norway
- Region: Central Norway
- County: Trøndelag
- District: Neadalen
- Municipality: Selbu Municipality
- Elevation: 165 m (541 ft)
- Time zone: UTC+01:00 (CET)
  - Summer (DST): UTC+02:00 (CEST)
- Post Code: 7584 Selbustrand

Tømra is a village in Selbu Municipality in Trøndelag county, Norway. It is located on the northeast shore of the lake Selbusjøen, approximately 7.1 kilometres (4.4 mi) north of the municipal center of Mebonden. The village of Fossan lies approximately 3.6 kilometres (2.2 mi) southwest of Tømra.

The village of Tømra and the surrounding countryside had a population (in 2024) of 246.
