= Stugudal Chapel =

Church in Trøndelag, Norway

- Stugudal kapell
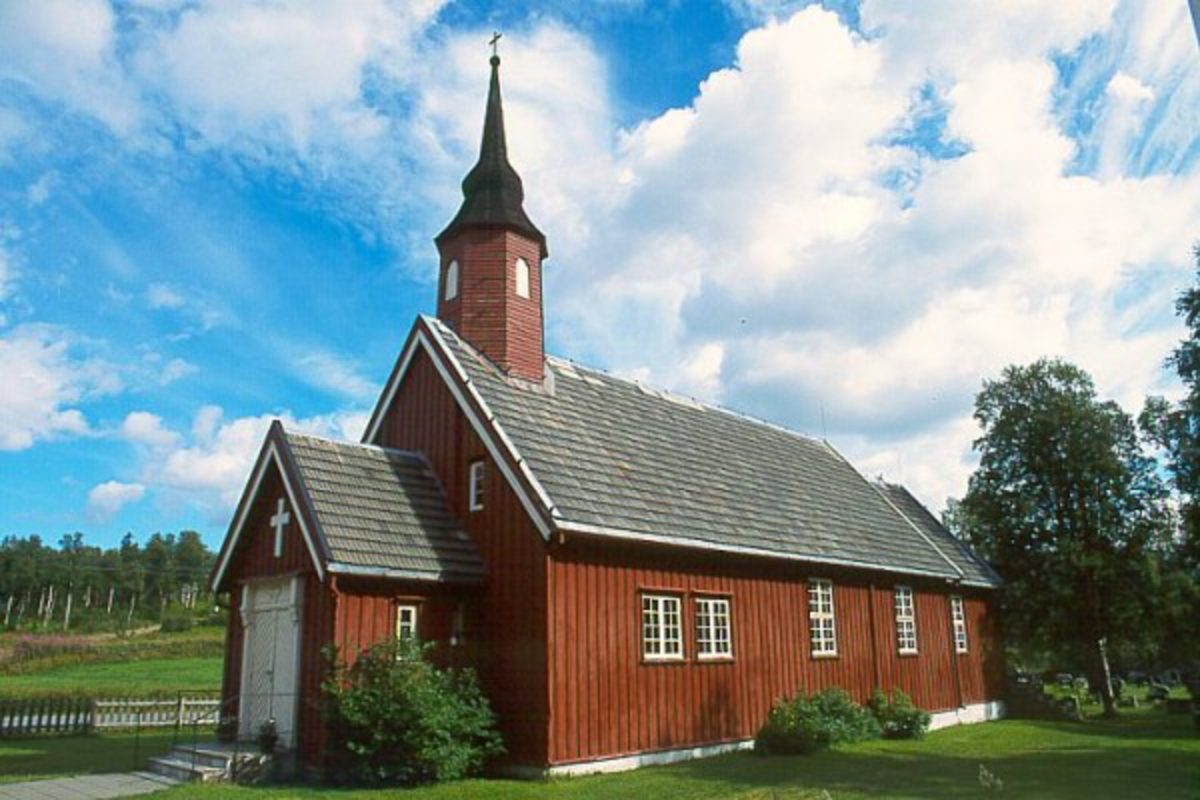
- View of the church
- Stugudal Chapel
- 62.907146148°N 11.89325273°E
- Location: Tydal Municipality, Trøndelag
- Country: Norway
- Denomination: Church of Norway
- Churchmanship: Evangelical Lutheran

History
- Status: Parish church
- Founded: 1957
- Consecrated: 28 July 1957

Architecture
- Functional status: Active
- Architect: John Egil Tverdahl
- Architectural type: Long church
- Completed: 1957 (69 years ago)

Specifications
- Capacity: 124
- Materials: Wood

Administration
- Diocese: Nidaros bispedømme
- Deanery: Stjørdal prosti
- Parish: Tydal
- Norwegian Cultural Heritage Site
- Type: Church
- Status: Not protected
- ID: 84990

Stugudal Chapel (Norwegian: Stugudal kapell) is a parish church of the Church of Norway in Tydal Municipality in Trøndelag county, Norway. It is located in the village of Stugudalen, about 20 kilometres (12 mi) southeast of the municipal center of Ås. It is one of the churches for the Tydal parish which is part of the Stjørdal prosti (deanery) in the Diocese of Nidaros. The red, wooden church was built in a long church style in 1957 by the architect John Egil Tverdahl. The church seats about 124 people.

== History ==
The farms in the Stugudal valley were fairly isolated for long periods of the year. This meant that the people of the valley could not get to church throughout the winters and worse, they could not transport the bodies of those who had died to the church for burial. Therefore, the village received permission to build an auxiliary cemetery in Stugudalen. The cemetery was consecrated in 1907. After this, the village desired their own chapel so they wouldn't have to travel so far to get to church. The preparations for a church building started in 1946 and over the next decade money was raised to pay for the new building. The new building was completed in 1957. On 28 July 1957, the chapel was consecrated by Bishop Arne Fjellbu, and since then the chapel has been regularly used for church services. By the turn of the 21st century, the area had more holiday cottages than permanent residents in the area, so the church is used less regularly.

== Media gallery ==
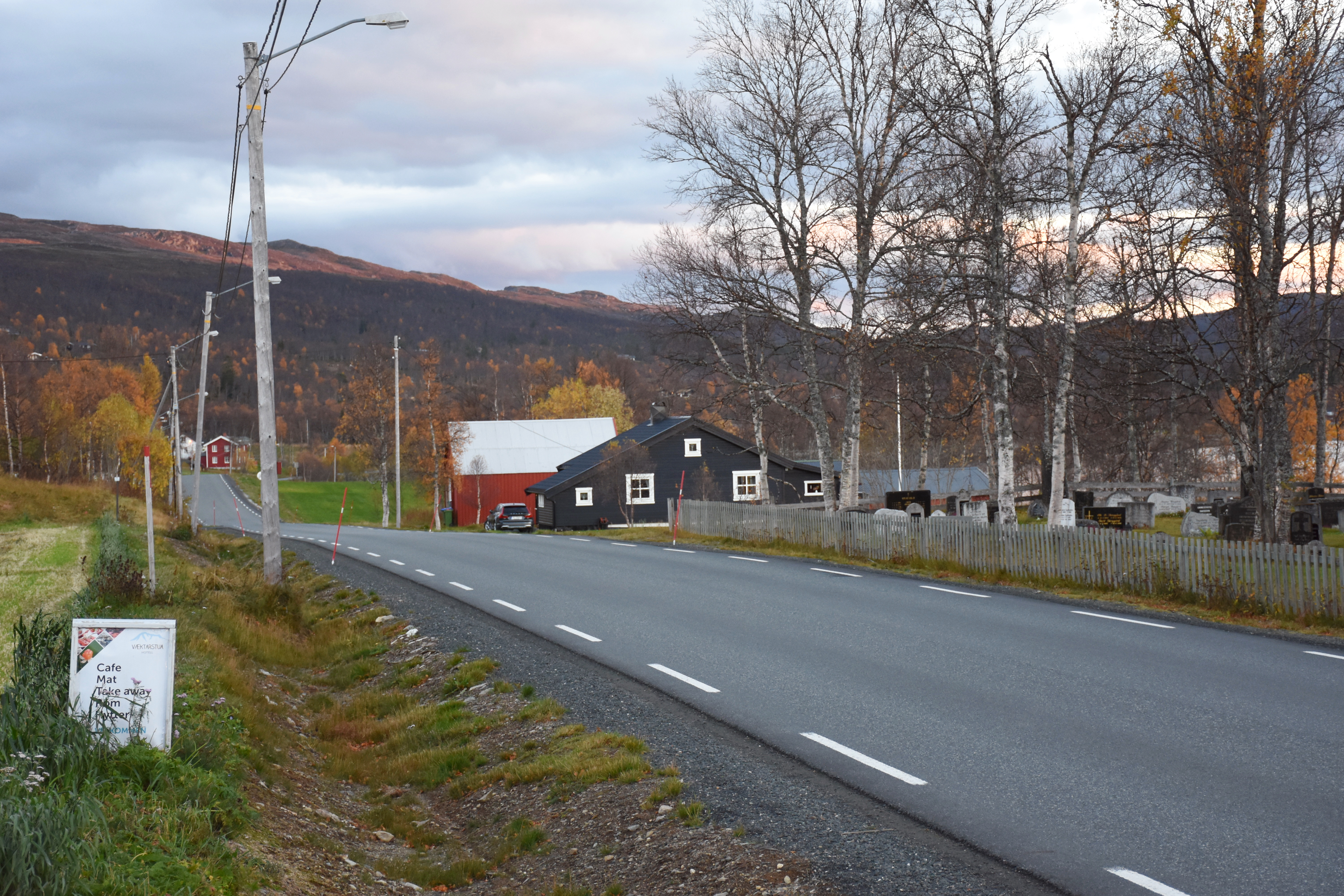

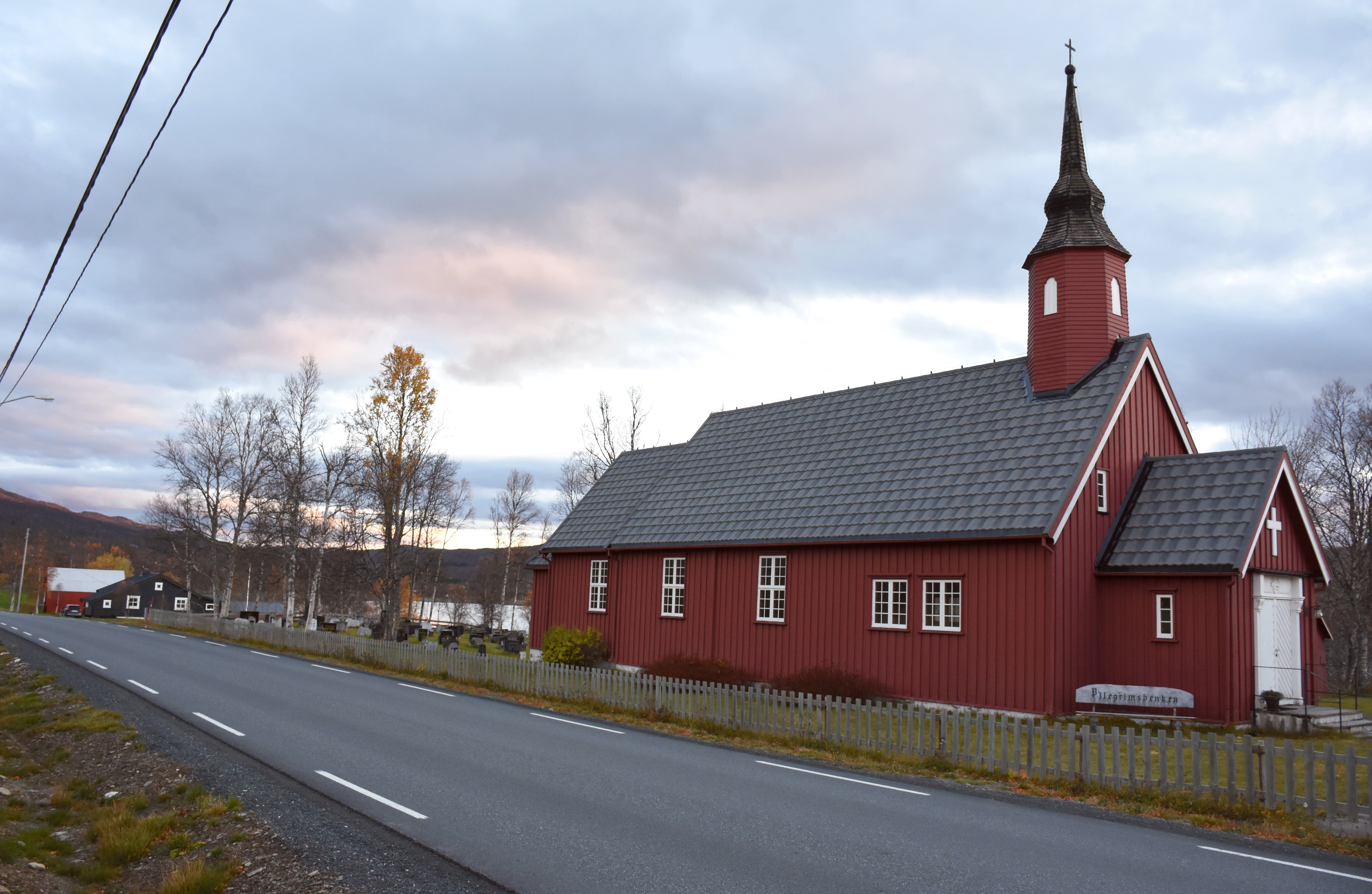

== See also ==
- List of churches in Nidaros
