= Nesjøen =

Lake in Trøndelag, Norway

- Interactive map of the lake (Esandsjøen lake is north of the red outline.)
- Location: Tydal Municipality, Trøndelag
- Coordinates: 62.9798°N 12.0079°E
- Type: Reservoir
- Primary outflows: Nea River
- Catchment area: Nea-Nidelvvassdraget
- Basin countries: Norway
- Built: 1971
- Max. length: 17.5 kilometres (10.9 mi)
- Max. width: 13 kilometres (8.1 mi)
- Surface area: 65.89 km^{2} (25.44 sq mi)
- Water volume: 340,000,000 cubic metres (440,000,000 yd^{3})
- Shore length^{1}: 113.59 kilometres (70.58 mi)
- Surface elevation: 733 m (2,405 ft) (Upper Essand); 722 m (2,369 ft) (Lower Essand); 710 metres (2,330 ft) (Nesjøen)
- References: NVE
- ^{1} Shore length is not a well-defined measure.

Nesjøen is an artificial lake (reservoir) in Tydal Municipality in Trøndelag county, Norway. The lake is part of the Nea-Nidelv watershed which lies on the western part of the Sylan mountain range. The lake lies about 10 kilometres (6.2 mi) southeast of the municipal center of Ås and 6.5 kilometres (4.0 mi) north of the village of Stugudalen. The lake is good for trout fishing.

== History ==
Trondheim Energiverk was given the contract for hydroelectric power generation in 1968 and they built and completed a dam in 1971. The dam was built on the Nea River and would flood the bogs to the east and north and would create a lake that would eventually merge with the nearby lake Esandsjøen. The results of the new, combined lake would be a 66-square-kilometre (25 sq mi) reservoir holding about 340,000,000 cubic metres (440,000,000 yd^{3}) of water. The lake Nesjøen has a total watershed feeding it of about 712 square kilometres (275 sq mi).

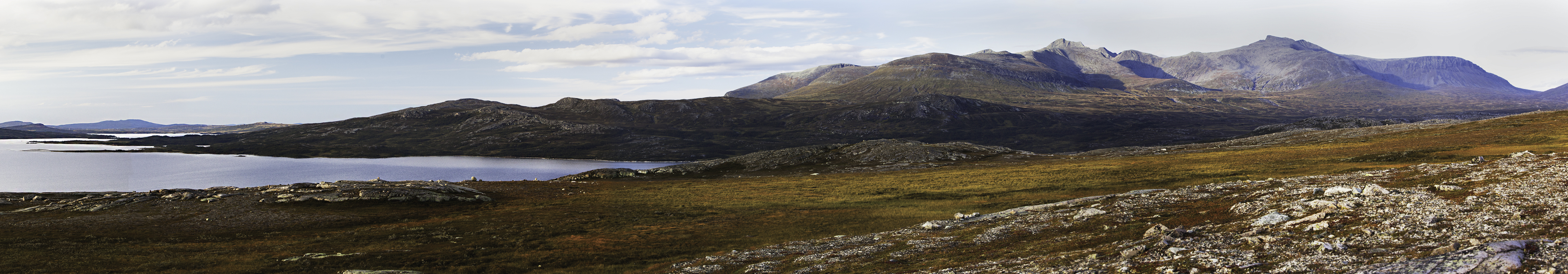
Sylan panorama

== Esandsjøen ==
Esandsjøen (Norwegian) or Saantenjaevrie (Southern Sami) is a former lake in Tydal Municipality that is now part of the lake Nesjøen. Esandsjøen became regulated for hydroelectric power production by Trondheim Energiverk with the construction of a dam at Esna that was built from 1941 until 1947. The lake had an area of about 27 square kilometres (10 sq mi). In 1971, another nearby dam was built and that lake gradually enlarged until it essentially merged with the Esandsjøen. Today the name Esandsjøen is used to refer to the northern part of the lake Nesjøen.

== See also ==
- List of lakes in Norway
