= Stugudalen =

Village in Tydal Municipality, Norway

- Village
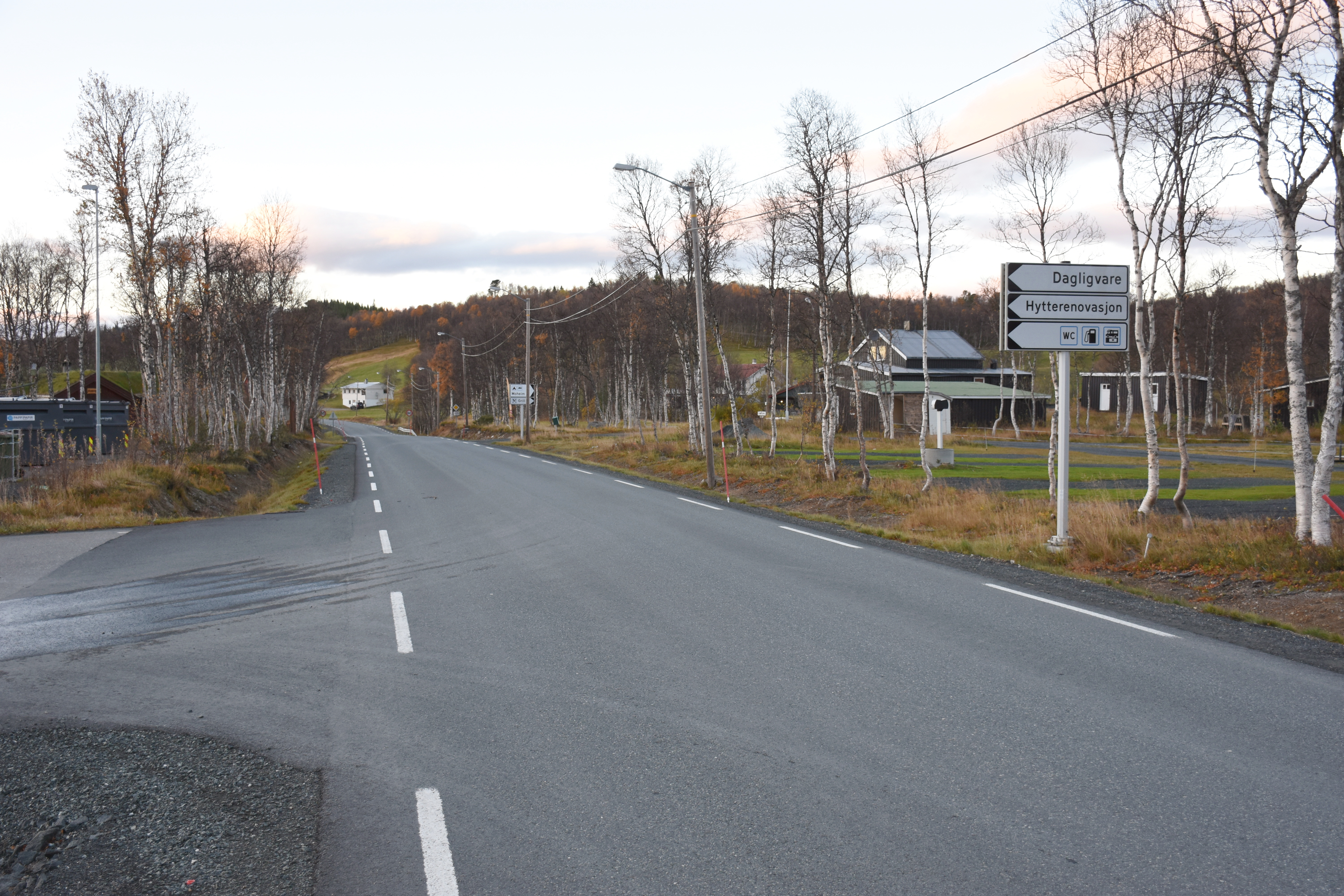
- View of the village
- Interactive map of Stugudalen
- Location within Trøndelag Location within Norway
- Coordinates: 62.9080°N 11.8928°E
- Country: Norway
- Region: Central Norway
- County: Trøndelag
- District: Neadalen
- Municipality: Tydal Municipality
- Elevation: 630 m (2,070 ft)
- Time zone: UTC+01:00 (CET)
  - Summer (DST): UTC+02:00 (CEST)
- Post Code: 7590 Tydal

Stugudalen is a village in Tydal Municipality in Trøndelag county, Norway. The village is located in the southeastern corner of the municipality. It sits along the lake Stugusjøen, about 20 kilometres (12 mi) southeast of the municipal center of Ås and about 6 kilometres (3.7 mi) south of the lake Nesjøen. The village is primarily a tourist area with many summer cabins near the lake. The Stugudal Chapel is located in the village.
