= Nidelva =

River in Trøndelag, Norway

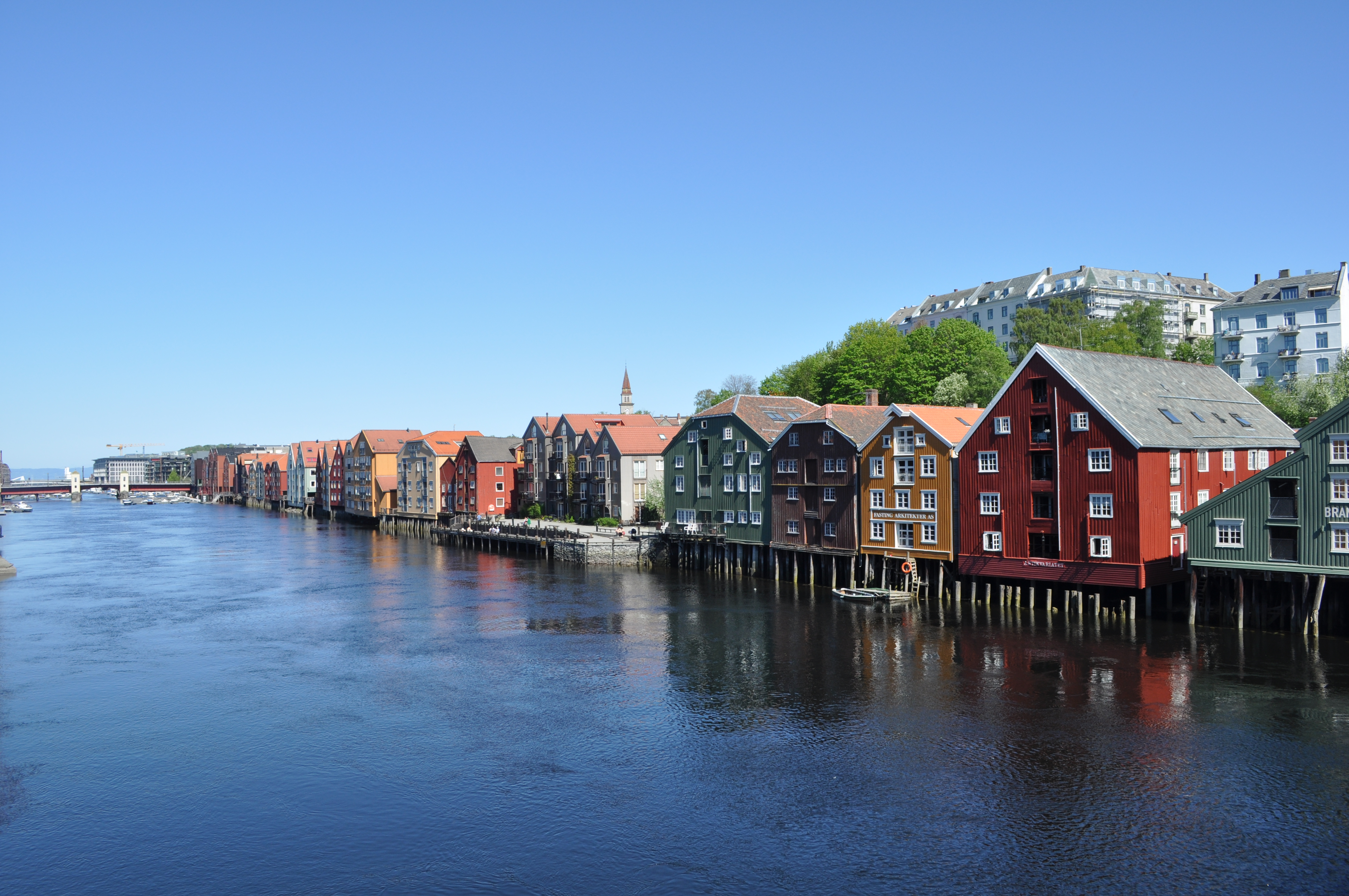
- Nidelva in Trondheim, view downstream
- Interactive map of the river

Location
- Country: Norway
- County: Trøndelag
- Municipality: Trondheim Municipality

Physical characteristics
- Source: Selbusjøen
  - location: Trondheim Municipality, Norway
  - coordinates: 63.2582°N 10.4637°E
  - elevation: 157 metres (515 ft)
- Mouth: Trondheimsfjorden
  - location: Trondheim Municipality, Norway
  - coordinates: 63.4438°N 10.4147°E
  - elevation: 0 metres (0 ft)
- Length: 30 km (19 mi)
- Basin size: 3,118 km^{2} (1,204 sq mi)
- Discharge
  - average: 94 m^{3}/s (3,300 cu ft/s)

Basin features
- River system: Nea-Nidelvvassdraget
- Inland ports: Trondheim

Nidelva is a 30-kilometre (19 mi) river in Trondheim in Trøndelag county, Norway.

== Location ==
The Nidelva starts at the Hyttfossen waterfall which rises from Bjørsjøen, a small lake located just below Selbusjøen, the largest lake in the southern part of Trøndelag County. The Nidelva runs north through Klæbu, then to Tiller, and then through the city of Trondheim before reaching Trondheimsfjord by the island of Brattøra near Trondheim Central Station. The Nidelva is at its deepest at the Trongfossen, a deep ravine in the village of Klæbu. There are six hydro-electric power stations along the river. The Nidelva forms the last part of the Nea-Nidelvvassdraget watershed. The Nea River is a tributary which empties into Selbusjøen, which in turn flows into the Nidelva.

A song referencing the river, Nidelven stille og vakker du er ("Nidelven quiet and beautiful you are"), was written by resistance fighter and composer Oskar Hoddø.

== Gallery ==
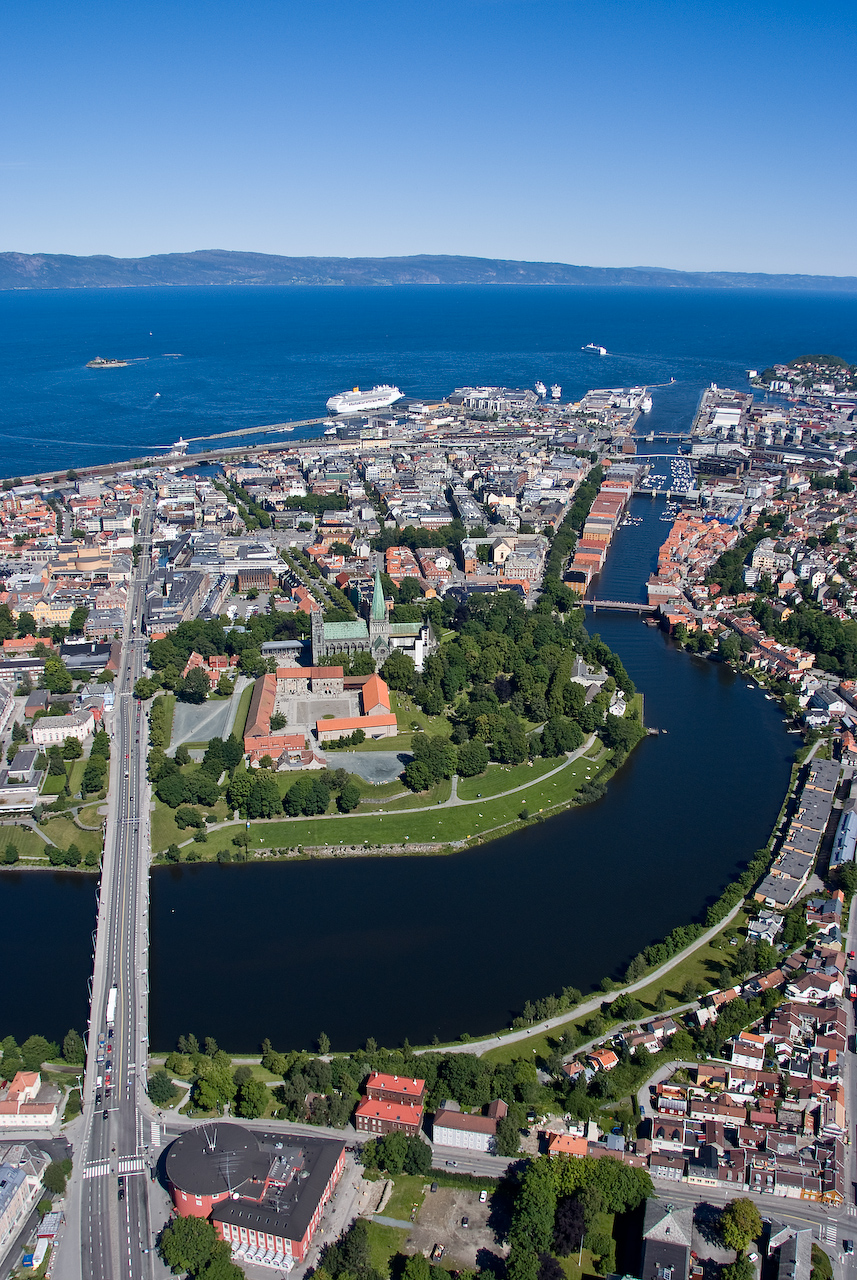
Overview, 2008

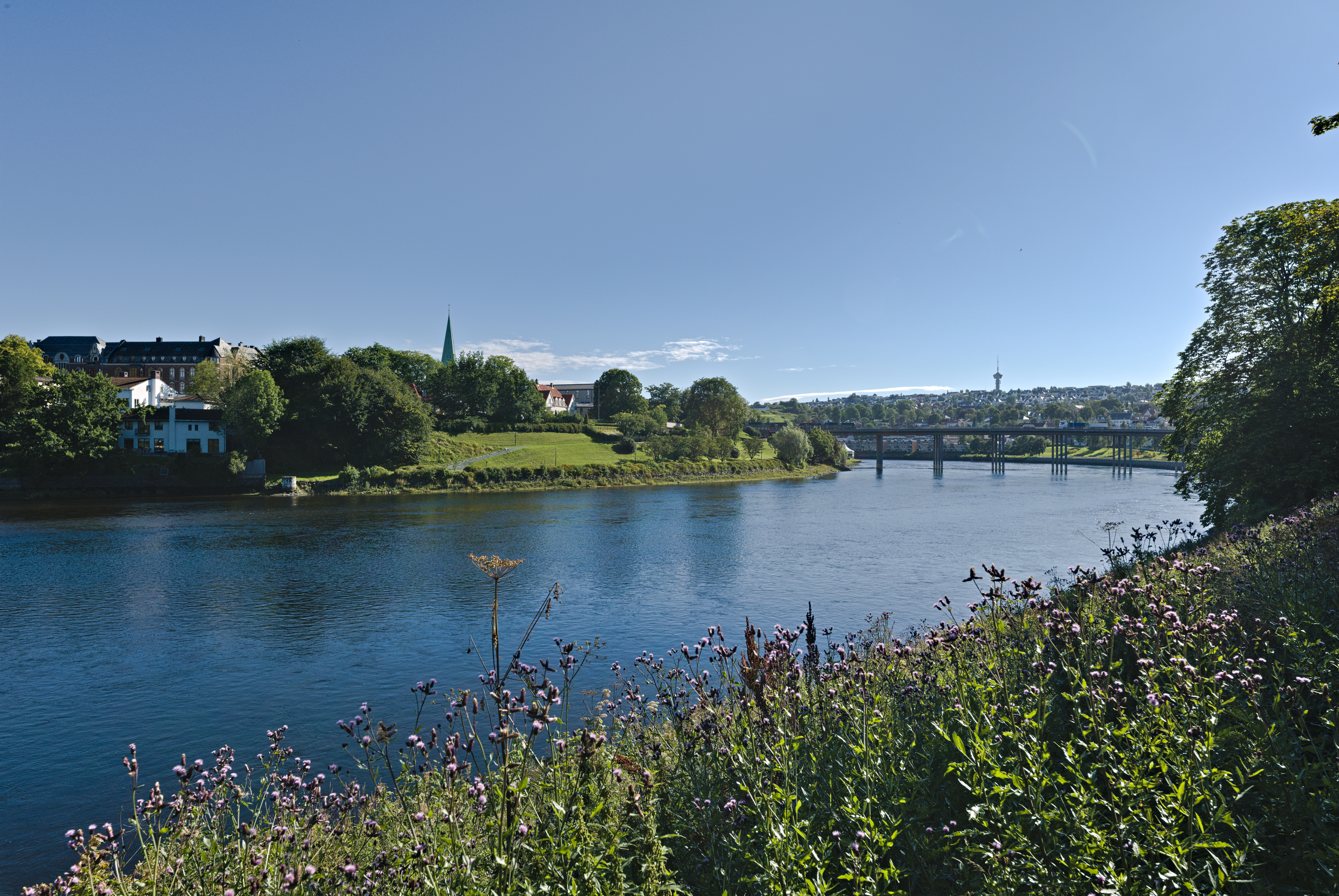
Nidelva, 2022

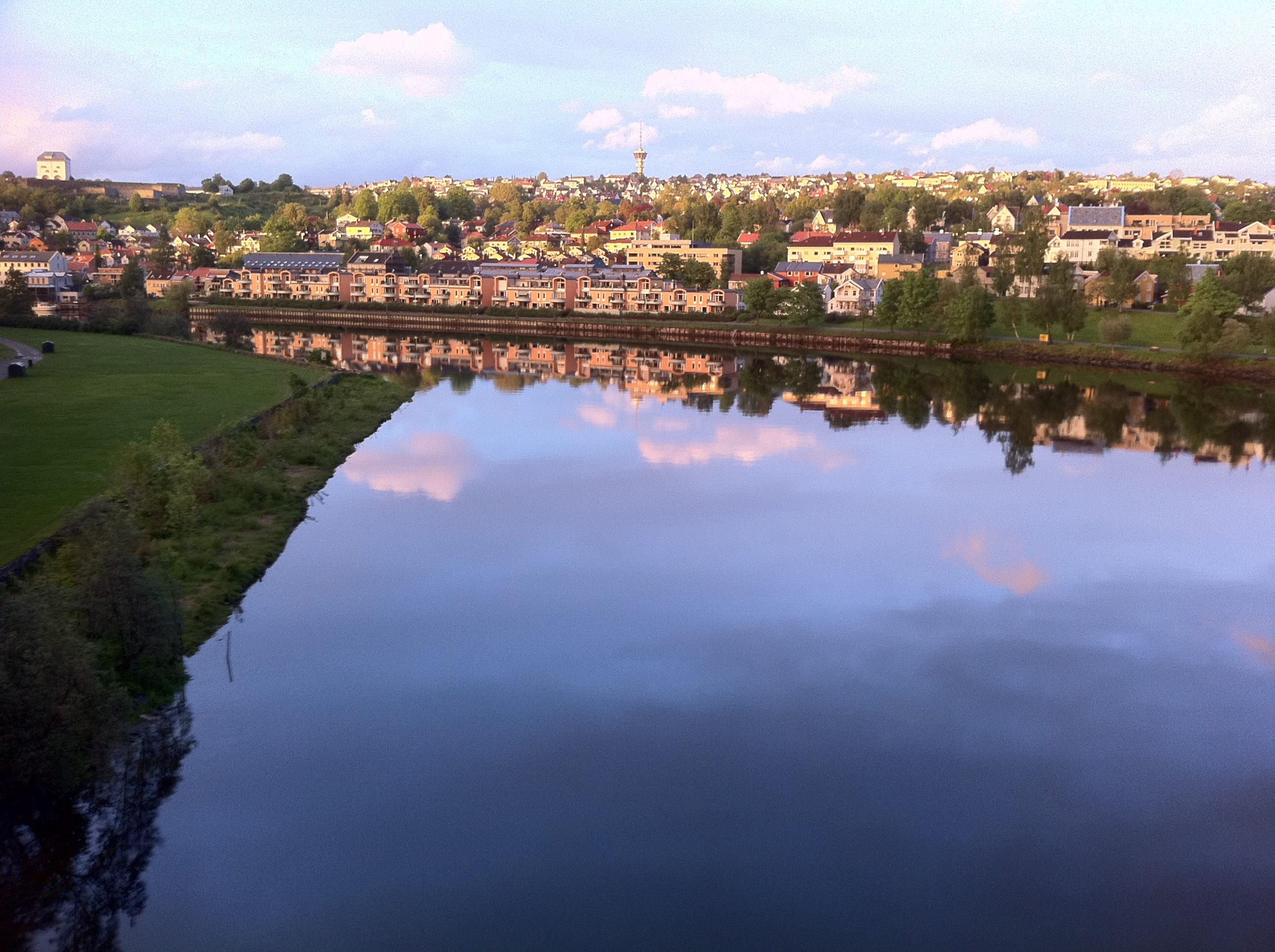
2011

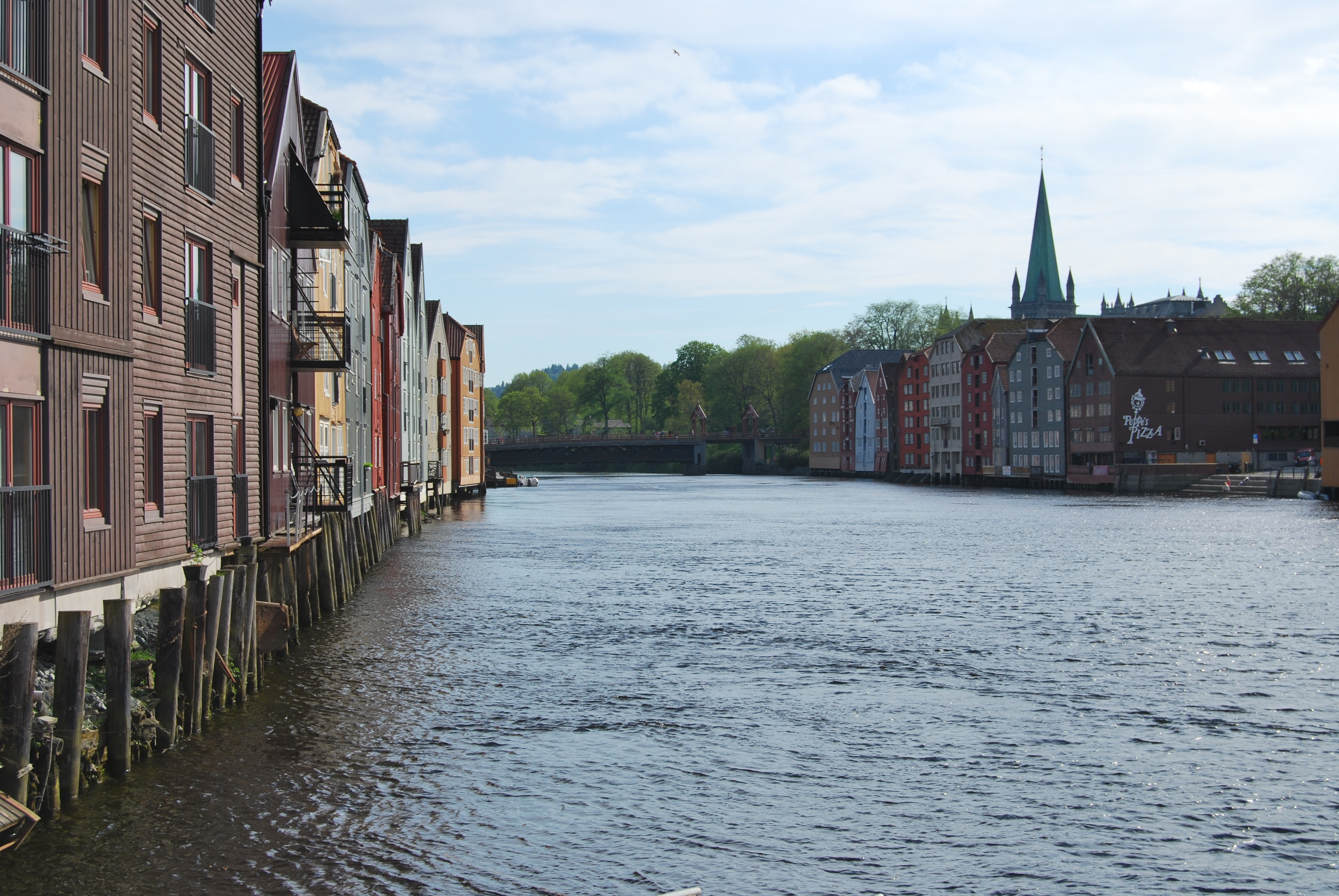
2012

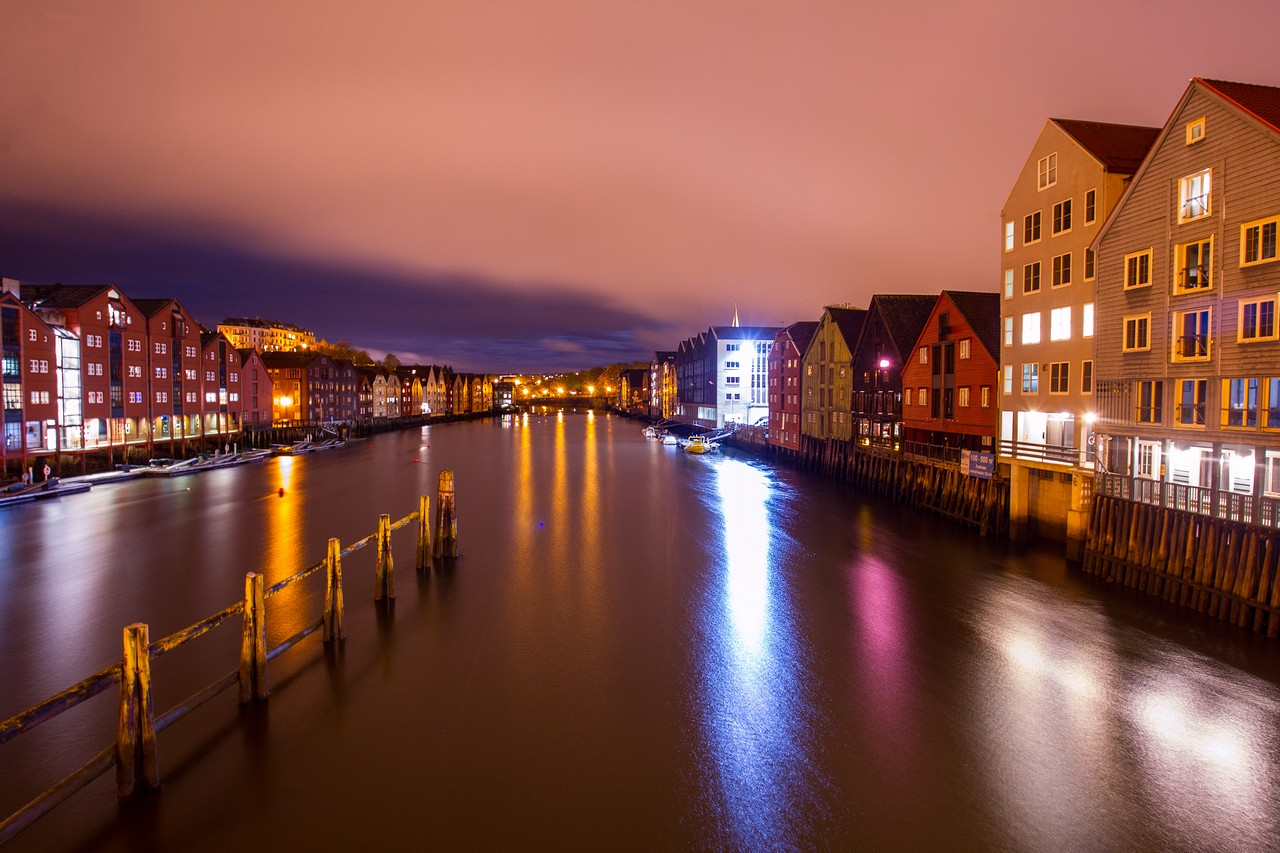
2012

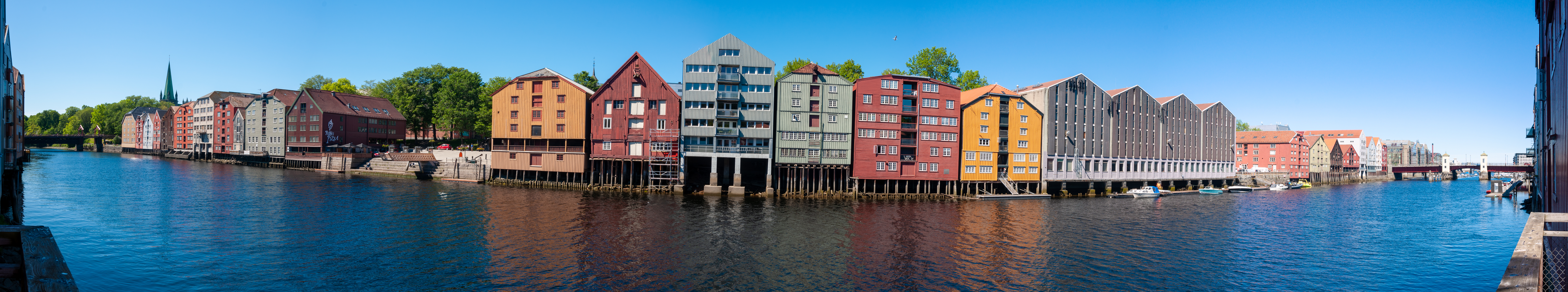
2018
