= Trondheim Energi =

Norwegian utility firm

Trondheim Energi AS
- Company type: Subsidiary
- Industry: Power
- Founded: 1901
- Founder: City of Trondheim
- Defunct: 2010
- Fate: Acquired by TrønderEnergi
- Headquarters: Trondheim, Norway
- Area served: Trondheim
- Key people: Bjørn Hølaas (CEO)
- Products: Electricity; District heating
- Revenue: 1,674 million kr (2006)
- Number of employees: 378 (2007)
- Parent: Statkraft
- Website: www.trondheimenergi.no

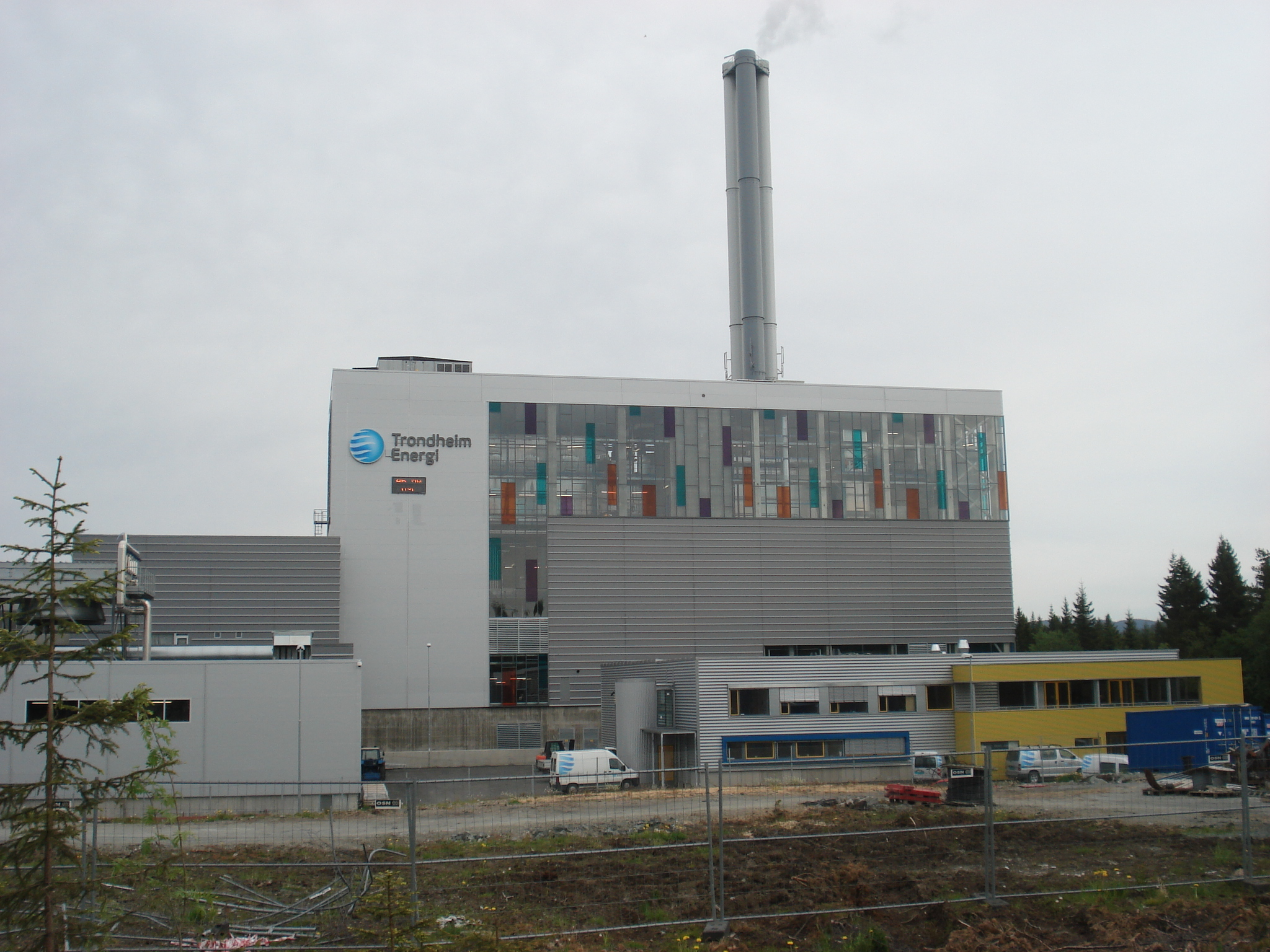
The district heating plant at Tiller

Trondheim Energi, formerly Trondheim Energiverk, was a Trondheim, Norway-based power company and a subsidiary of Statkraft. The company owned the power grid and district heating in Trondheim Municipality and Klæbu Municipality, fourteen hydroelectric power plants in Nea and Nidelva, and five partially owned power plants in the Orkla Valley.

== History ==
Trondheim Energi was founded in 1901 as Trondhjems Elektricitetsværk og Sporvei to build a power plant in Øvre Leirfoss and operate the Trondheim Tramway. In 1921 the company was split into Trondheim Energiverk (TEV) and Trondheim Sporvei, the latter with responsibility for the tramway. In 1952 TEV and Stockholm Elverk made an agreement where they would cooperate in building the Nea power plant. The agreement included exchange of power with Sweden. In 1982 the district heating system was decided built by the municipal council, with operation starting in 1986.

In 1997 the company was reorganized as a limited company and in 1999 as a corporation. In 2002 Trondheim city council sold the company to Statkraft.

Total production of electricity was 2,865 GWh in 2006, while district heating was 451 GWh. Trondheim Energi has 82,000 power customers, 93,000 grid customers and 2,400 district heating customers.

In 2007 the group changed its name to Trondheim Energi.

Trondheim Energi was bought by TrønderEnergi from Statkraft in 2010.
