= Selbu Municipality =

Municipality in Trøndelag, Norway

Selbu Municipality Selbu kommune Saalpove
- Municipality
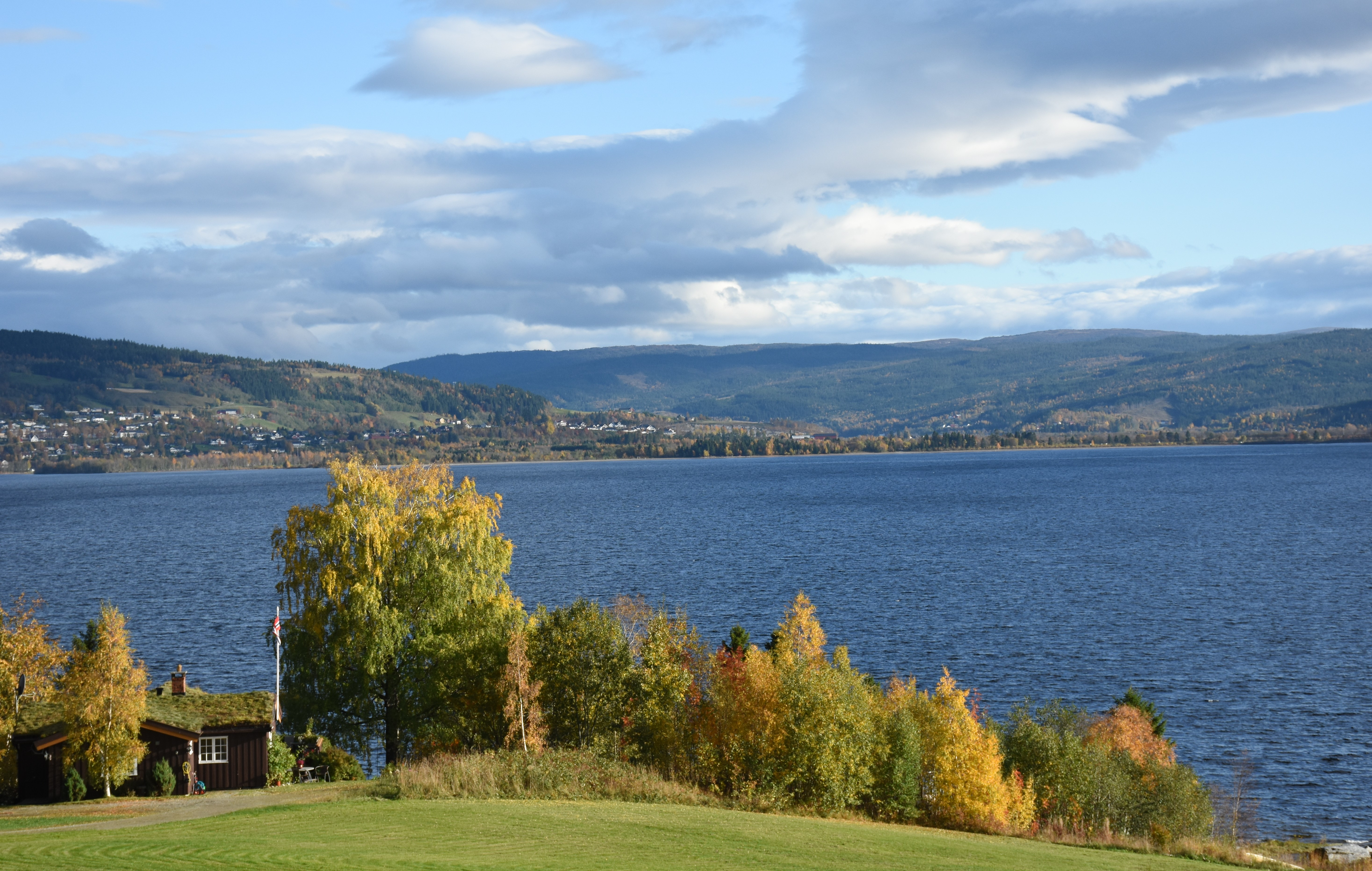
- Part of Selbustrand and Selbusjøen

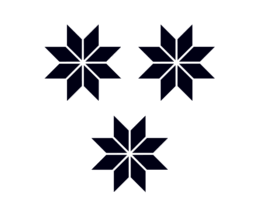
- Flag Coat of arms

- Trøndelag within Norway

- Selbu within Trøndelag
- Coordinates: 63°11′54″N 11°08′25″E
- Country: Norway
- County: Trøndelag
- District: Neadalen
- Established: 1 Jan 1838
  - Created as: Formannskapsdistrikt
- Administrative centre: Mebonden

Government
  - Mayor (2015): Ole Morten Balstad (Ap)

Area
  - Total: 1,234.84 km^{2} (476.77 sq mi)
  - Land: 1,139.94 km^{2} (440.13 sq mi)
  - Water: 94.90 km^{2} (36.64 sq mi) 7.7%
  - Rank: #86 in Norway
- Highest elevation: 1,441.37 m (4,728.9 ft)

Population (2024)
  - Total: 4,216
  - Rank: #200 in Norway
  - Density: 3.4/km^{2} (8.8/sq mi)
  - Change (10 years): ▲ +4.6%
- Demonym: Selbygg

Official language
  - Norwegian form: Neutral
- Time zone: UTC+01:00 (CET)
  - Summer (DST): UTC+02:00 (CEST)
- ISO 3166 code: NO-5032
- Website: Official website

Selbu is a municipality in Trøndelag county, Norway. The administrative centre of the municipality is the village of Mebonden. Other villages in Selbu include Flora, Fossan, Hyttbakken, Innbygda, Selbustrand, Trøa, Tømra, and Vikvarvet.

The 1,235-square-kilometre (477 sq mi) municipality is the 86th largest by area out of the 357 municipalities in Norway. Selbu Municipality is the 200th most populous municipality in Norway with a population of 4,216. The municipality's population density is 3.4 inhabitants per square kilometre (8.8/sq mi) and its population has increased by 4.6% over the previous 10-year period.

== General information ==
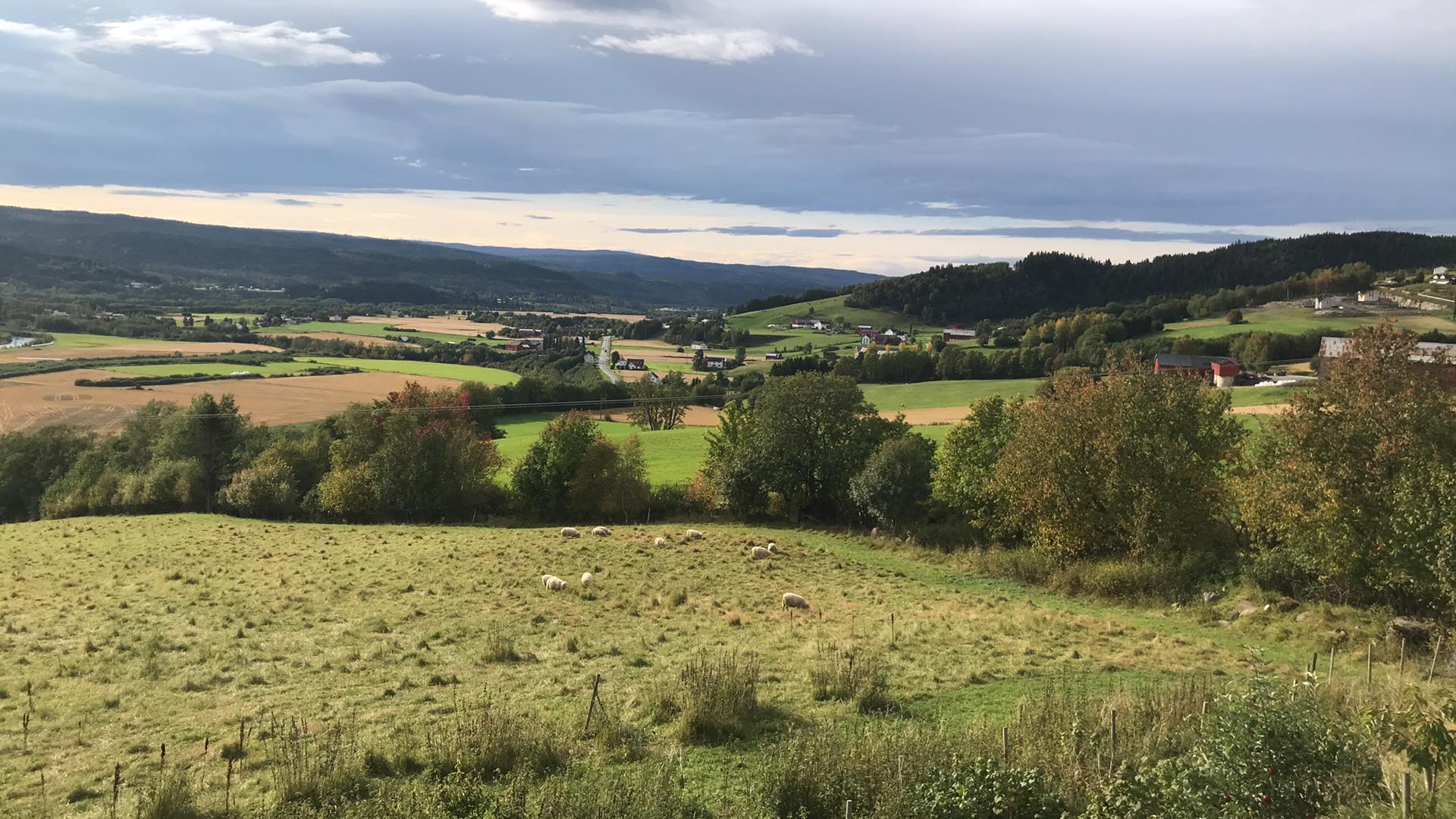
View of the Øverbygda area

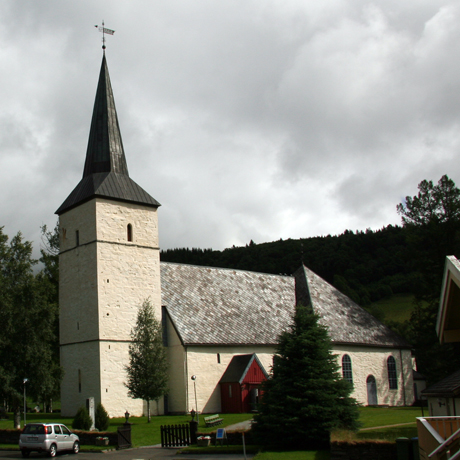
View of the Selbu Church

The parish of Selbu was established as a municipality on 1 January 1838 (see formannskapsdistrikt law). On 1 January 1901, the eastern part of the municipality was separated to form the new Tydal Municipality. This left Selbu Municipality with 4,607 inhabitants. The borders of Selbu have not changed since that date.

On 1 January 2018, the municipality switched from the old Sør-Trøndelag county to the new Trøndelag county.

=== Name ===
The municipality (originally the parish) is named "Selbu" (Old Norse: Selabú) after a nearby lake since the first Selbu Church was built near its southeastern shore. The first element is the genitive case of the old name of the lake Selbusjøen (Old Norse: Seli). The old name of the lake is probably derived from the word seli which means "harness" since the lake is long and narrow. The last element is bú which means "rural district".

=== Coat of arms ===
The coat of arms was granted on 31 May 1991. The official blazon is "Argent, 24 lozenges sable in three rosettes two over one" (Norwegian: I sølv 24 svarte spissruter samlet i tre rosetter, 2-1). This means the arms have a field (background) has a tincture of argent which means it is commonly colored white, but if it is made out of metal, then silver is used. The charge is a three selburoses made out of 8 rhombus shapes each. The selburose design is a typical pattern used in the local lusekofte (traditional Norwegian sweaters) and other woollen garments. Home knitting has been a long tradition in the municipality. The arms were designed by John Digernes. The municipal flag has the same design as the coat of arms.

=== Churches ===
The Church of Norway has one parish (sokn) within Selbu Municipality. It is part of the Stjørdal prosti (deanery) in the Diocese of Nidaros.

Churches in Selbu Municipality
Parish (sokn)	Church name	Location of the church	Year built
Selbu	Selbu Church	Mebonden	1150
Selbu	Selbustrand Church	Selbustrand	1901
Selbu	Flora Chapel	Flora	1936

== Economy ==
Selbu mittens

Traditionally, Selbu has been an agricultural and forest managing community. The area is well known for its special knitting techniques such as the Selburose. The last decades have led to efforts in business such as high technology, electronics, and mechanics. The newspaper Selbyggen has been published in Selbu since 1889.

== Government ==
Selbu Municipality is responsible for primary education (through 10th grade), outpatient health services, senior citizen services, welfare and other social services, zoning, economic development, and municipal roads and utilities. The municipality is governed by a municipal council of directly elected representatives. The mayor is indirectly elected by a vote of the municipal council. The municipality is under the jurisdiction of the Trøndelag District Court and the Frostating Court of Appeal. Waste management has since 2000 been provided by the intermunicipal agency Innherred Renovasjon, and waste collection has been operated by ReTrans Midt since 2018.

=== Municipal council ===
The municipal council (Kommunestyre) of Selbu Municipality is made up of 25 representatives that are elected to four year terms. The tables below show the current and historical composition of the council by political party.

Selbu kommunestyre 2023–2027
Party name (in Norwegian)	Number of representatives
Labour Party (Arbeiderpartiet)	11
Conservative Party (Høyre)	3
Centre Party (Senterpartiet)	8
Socialist Left Party (Sosialistisk Venstreparti)	3
Total number of members:	25

Selbu kommunestyre 2019–2023
Party name (in Norwegian)	Number of representatives
Labour Party (Arbeiderpartiet)	13
Centre Party (Senterpartiet)	7
Socialist Left Party (Sosialistisk Venstreparti)	2
Joint list of the Conservative Party (Høyre) and Christian Democratic Party (Kristelig Folkeparti)	3
Total number of members:	25

Selbu kommunestyre 2015–2019
Party name (in Norwegian)	Number of representatives
Labour Party (Arbeiderpartiet)	10
Green Party (Miljøpartiet De Grønne)	1
Conservative Party (Høyre)	4
Socialist Left Party (Sosialistisk Venstreparti)	2
Joint list of the Centre Party (Senterpartiet), Christian Democratic Party (Kristelig Folkeparti), and Liberal Party (Venstre)	8
Total number of members:	25

Selbu kommunestyre 2011–2015
Party name (in Norwegian)	Number of representatives
Progress Party (Fremskrittspartiet)	3
Conservative Party (Høyre)	4
Joint list of the Labour Party (Arbeiderpartiet) and the Socialist Left Party (Sosialistisk Venstreparti)	12
Joint list of the Centre Party (Senterpartiet), Christian Democratic Party (Kristelig Folkeparti), and Liberal Party (Venstre)	6
Total number of members:	25

Selbu kommunestyre 2007–2011
Party name (in Norwegian)	Number of representatives
Progress Party (Fremskrittspartiet)	3
Conservative Party (Høyre)	3
Joint list of the Labour Party (Arbeiderpartiet) and the Socialist Left Party (Sosialistisk Venstreparti)	11
Joint list of the Centre Party (Senterpartiet), Christian Democratic Party (Kristelig Folkeparti), and Liberal Party (Venstre)	8
Total number of members:	25

Selbu kommunestyre 2003–2007
Party name (in Norwegian)	Number of representatives
Labour Party (Arbeiderpartiet)	8
Progress Party (Fremskrittspartiet)	3
Conservative Party (Høyre)	3
Joint list: Socialist Left Party and independent socialists (Fellesliste av Sosialistisk venstreparti og uavhengige sosialister)	3
Joint list of the Centre Party (Senterpartiet), Christian Democratic Party (Kristelig Folkeparti), and Liberal Party (Venstre)	8
Total number of members:	25

Selbu kommunestyre 1999–2003
Party name (in Norwegian)	Number of representatives
Labour Party (Arbeiderpartiet)	10
Progress Party (Fremskrittspartiet)	2
Joint list: Socialist Left Party and independent socialists (Fellesliste av Sosialistisk venstreparti og uavhengige sosialister)	2
Joint list of the Conservative Party (Høyre), Christian Democratic Party (Kristelig Folkeparti), Centre Party (Senterpartiet), and Liberal Party (Venstre)	11
Total number of members:	25

Selbu kommunestyre 1995–1999
Party name (in Norwegian)	Number of representatives
Labour Party (Arbeiderpartiet)	10
Conservative Party (Høyre)	3
Liberal Party (Venstre)	1
Joint list: Socialist Left Party and independent socialists (Fellesliste av Sosialistisk venstreparti og uavhengige sosialister)	3
Joint list of the Centre Party (Senterpartiet) and the Christian Democratic Party (Kristelig Folkeparti)	8
Total number of members:	25

Selbu kommunestyre 1991–1995
Party name (in Norwegian)	Number of representatives
Labour Party (Arbeiderpartiet)	10
Conservative Party (Høyre)	3
Christian Democratic Party (Kristelig Folkeparti)	1
Centre Party (Senterpartiet)	6
Liberal Party (Venstre)	1
Joint list: Socialist Left Party and independent socialists (Fellesliste av Sosialistisk venstreparti og uavhengige sosialister)	4
Total number of members:	25

Selbu kommunestyre 1987–1991
Party name (in Norwegian)	Number of representatives
Labour Party (Arbeiderpartiet)	13
Conservative Party (Høyre)	4
Christian Democratic Party (Kristelig Folkeparti)	1
Centre Party (Senterpartiet)	4
Liberal Party (Venstre)	1
Joint list of the Socialist Left Party, Communist Party, and independent socialists (Fellesliste av Sosialistisk venstreparti, Norges kommunistisk parti og uavhengige sosialister)	2
Total number of members:	25

Selbu kommunestyre 1983–1987
Party name (in Norwegian)	Number of representatives
Labour Party (Arbeiderpartiet)	12
Conservative Party (Høyre)	4
Joint list of the Centre Party (Senterpartiet), Christian Democratic Party (Kristelig Folkeparti), Liberal People's Party (Liberale Folkepartiet), and Liberal Party (Venstre)	7
Joint list of the Socialist Left Party (Sosialistisk Venstreparti) and the Communist Party (Kommunistiske Parti)	2
Total number of members:	25

Selbu kommunestyre 1979–1983
Party name (in Norwegian)	Number of representatives
Labour Party (Arbeiderpartiet)	10
Joint list of the Conservative Party (Høyre), Christian Democratic Party (Kristelig Folkeparti), New People's Party (Nye Folkepartiet), Centre Party (Senterpartiet), and Liberal Party (Venstre)	13
Joint list of the Socialist Left Party (Sosialistisk Venstreparti) and the Communist Party (Kommunistiske Parti)	2
Total number of members:	25

Selbu kommunestyre 1975–1979
Party name (in Norwegian)	Number of representatives
Labour Party (Arbeiderpartiet)	9
Socialist Left Party (Sosialistisk Venstreparti)	3
Joint list of the Conservative Party (Høyre), Christian Democratic Party (Kristelig Folkeparti), New People's Party (Nye Folkepartiet), Centre Party (Senterpartiet), and Liberal Party (Venstre)	13
Total number of members:	25

Selbu kommunestyre 1971–1975
Party name (in Norwegian)	Number of representatives
Labour Party (Arbeiderpartiet)	11
Conservative Party (Høyre)	2
Christian Democratic Party (Kristelig Folkeparti)	2
Centre Party (Senterpartiet)	6
Liberal Party (Venstre)	2
Socialist common list (Venstresosialistiske felleslister)	2
Total number of members:	25

Selbu kommunestyre 1967–1971
Party name (in Norwegian)	Number of representatives
Labour Party (Arbeiderpartiet)	12
Conservative Party (Høyre)	2
Communist Party (Kommunistiske Parti)	1
Christian Democratic Party (Kristelig Folkeparti)	2
Centre Party (Senterpartiet)	5
Socialist People's Party (Sosialistisk Folkeparti)	1
Liberal Party (Venstre)	2
Total number of members:	25

Selbu kommunestyre 1963–1967
Party name (in Norwegian)	Number of representatives
Labour Party (Arbeiderpartiet)	11
Conservative Party (Høyre)	2
Communist Party (Kommunistiske Parti)	2
Christian Democratic Party (Kristelig Folkeparti)	2
Centre Party (Senterpartiet)	6
Liberal Party (Venstre)	2
Total number of members:	25

Selbu herredsstyre 1959–1963
Party name (in Norwegian)	Number of representatives
Labour Party (Arbeiderpartiet)	12
Conservative Party (Høyre)	1
Communist Party (Kommunistiske Parti)	2
Christian Democratic Party (Kristelig Folkeparti)	2
Centre Party (Senterpartiet)	6
Liberal Party (Venstre)	2
Total number of members:	25

Selbu herredsstyre 1955–1959
Party name (in Norwegian)	Number of representatives
Labour Party (Arbeiderpartiet)	11
Conservative Party (Høyre)	1
Communist Party (Kommunistiske Parti)	3
Christian Democratic Party (Kristelig Folkeparti)	2
Farmers' Party (Bondepartiet)	5
Liberal Party (Venstre)	3
Total number of members:	25

Selbu herredsstyre 1951–1955
Party name (in Norwegian)	Number of representatives
Labour Party (Arbeiderpartiet)	10
Conservative Party (Høyre)	1
Communist Party (Kommunistiske Parti)	3
Christian Democratic Party (Kristelig Folkeparti)	2
Farmers' Party (Bondepartiet)	5
Liberal Party (Venstre)	3
Total number of members:	24

Selbu herredsstyre 1947–1951
Party name (in Norwegian)	Number of representatives
Labour Party (Arbeiderpartiet)	10
Conservative Party (Høyre)	1
Communist Party (Kommunistiske Parti)	3
Christian Democratic Party (Kristelig Folkeparti)	2
Farmers' Party (Bondepartiet)	5
Liberal Party (Venstre)	3
Total number of members:	24

Selbu herredsstyre 1945–1947
Party name (in Norwegian)	Number of representatives
Labour Party (Arbeiderpartiet)	10
Communist Party (Kommunistiske Parti)	4
Christian Democratic Party (Kristelig Folkeparti)	2
Farmers' Party (Bondepartiet)	5
Liberal Party (Venstre)	3
Total number of members:	24

Selbu herredsstyre 1937–1941*
Party name (in Norwegian)	Number of representatives
Labour Party (Arbeiderpartiet)	13
Farmers' Party (Bondepartiet)	6
Liberal Party (Venstre)	5
Total number of members:	24
Note: Due to the German occupation of Norway during World War II, no elections were held for new municipal councils until after the war ended in 1945.

=== Mayors ===
The mayor (Norwegian: ordfører) of Selbu Municipality is the political leader of the municipality and the chairperson of the municipal council. Here is a list of people who have held this position:

- 1838–1845: Hans E. Sandborg
- 1845–1847: Ole I. Sesseng
- 1848–1855: Hans Henrik Emil Tybring
- 1856–1873: Ingebrigt Norbye
- 1873–1873: Agathon Bartholomæus Hansteen
- 1874–1893: Ingebrigt Flønæs (H)
- 1894–1898: John Klegseth (V)
- 1899–1916: Ole O. Henmo (V)
- 1917–1922: Peder Johannes Norbye (V)
- 1923–1925: Ole H. Kjøsnes (Ap)
- 1926–1928: Arnt Kvello (Bp)
- 1929–1940: Ole H. Kjøsnes (Ap)
- 1941–1941: P.P. Evjen (Bp)
- 1941–1945: Martin Hofsli (NS)
- 1945–1963: Johan Berge (Ap)
- 1964–1975: Olav N. Overvik (Ap)
- 1976–1983: Halvard Kulseth (Sp)
- 1984–1987: Albert Uglem (Ap)
- 1988–1995: Helga Renå (Ap)
- 1995–1999: Torbjørn Olsen (Ap)
- 1999–2003: Kjell Mebust (KrF)
- 2003–2007: Karin Galaaen (Sp)
- 2007–2015: Inga Balstad (Ap)
- 2015–present: Ole Morten Balstad (Ap)

== Geography ==
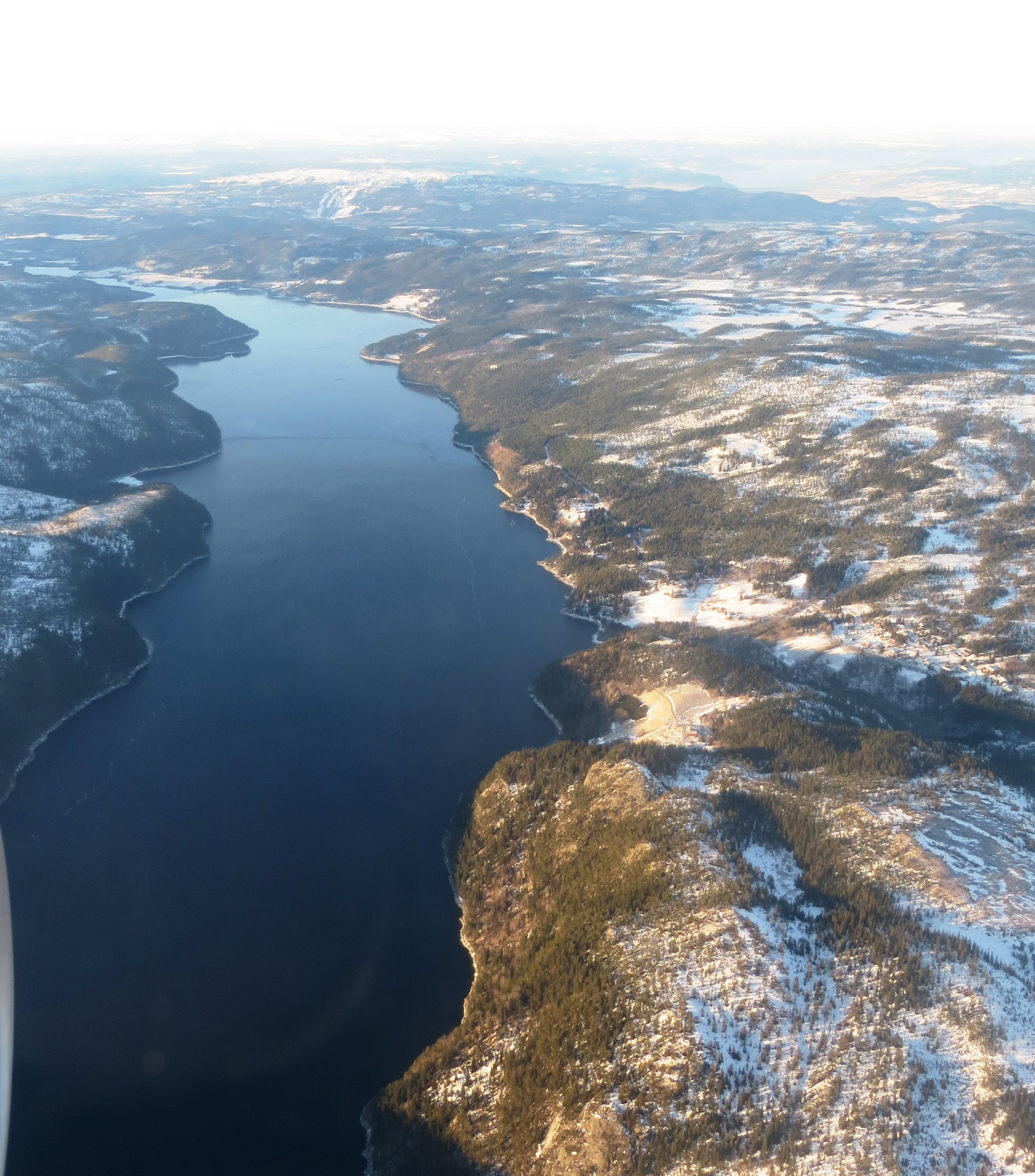
Selbusjöen lake

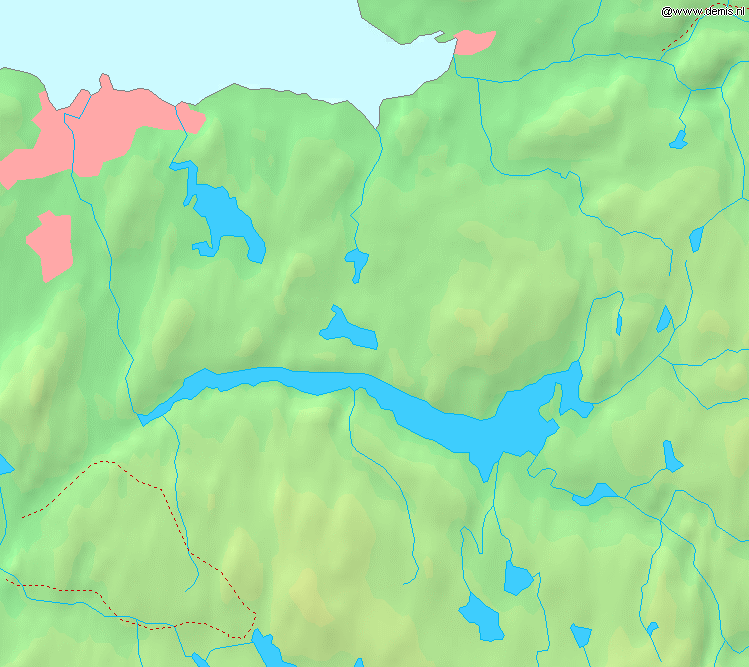
Map of Selbu lake (center) in relation to Trondheim (red)

Selbu borders eight municipalities: Malvik Municipality, and Stjørdal Municipality are to the north; Meråker Municipality and Tydal Municipality are to the east; Holtålen Municipality, and Midtre Gauldal Municipality are to the south; and Melhus Municipality and Trondheim Municipality are to the west.

The largest lake in Selbu is Selbusjøen with an area of about 60 square kilometres (23 sq mi). It is located 160 metres (520 ft) above sea level. Another lake in the municipality is Sørungen. The highest mountain in Selbu is the 1,441.37-metre (4,728.9 ft) tall mountain Fongen, located inside Skarvan and Roltdalen National Park, forming the tripoint border with Meråker, Tydal, and Selbu municipalities. The Nea River and Rotla River both flow through the municipality. The municipality covers a total of 1,254 square kilometres (484 sq mi) which consists of:

Land use in Selbu
Land type	Area		
Land type	square kilometres	square miles	percentage
Freshwater lakes (Note: Including the Selbusjøen Lake, which itself is over 58 square kilometres (22 sq mi) in area, making it the largest lake in Sør-Trøndelag and the 17th largest lake in Norway.) and rivers	85	33	6.8
Agriculture	31	12	2.5
Woodlands	308	119	14.7
Swampland and mountains	830	320	66.0

== Climate ==
Located inland in the Trøndelag region at relatively low altitude, Selbu has a humid continental climate (Dfb), but with a relatively mild winter for this climate type, as the sea is not that far away. The all-time low −30 °C (−22 °F) was recorded Februar 2010 and January record low is also from 2010, all the other record lows are from 1983 or older. The all-time high 33.3 °C (91.9 °F) is from June 2020. Recent decades have tended to be warmer than earlier decades; 8 of the 12 record highs are from after 2010.

Climate data for Selbu 1991-2020 (160 m, precipitation days 1961-90, extremes 1957-2020 includes earlier stations)
Month	Jan	Feb	Mar	Apr	May	Jun	Jul	Aug	Sep	Oct	Nov	Dec	Year
Record high °C (°F)	12.5 (54.5)	11.8 (53.2)	16.3 (61.3)	21.5 (70.7)	28.1 (82.6)	33.3 (91.9)	33.2 (91.8)	30.5 (86.9)	27.3 (81.1)	22 (72)	14.3 (57.7)	12.4 (54.3)	33.3 (91.9)
Daily mean °C (°F)	−2.7 (27.1)	−2.8 (27.0)	−0.5 (31.1)	3.6 (38.5)	7.9 (46.2)	11.7 (53.1)	14.7 (58.5)	13.9 (57.0)	10.2 (50.4)	4.8 (40.6)	0.5 (32.9)	−2.3 (27.9)	4.9 (40.9)
Record low °C (°F)	−29.7 (−21.5)	−30 (−22)	−26 (−15)	−17 (1)	−7 (19)	−1.5 (29.3)	−0.2 (31.6)	−0.3 (31.5)	−4.8 (23.4)	−13.2 (8.2)	−23.5 (−10.3)	−25.2 (−13.4)	−30 (−22)
Average precipitation mm (inches)	57 (2.2)	51 (2.0)	62 (2.4)	43 (1.7)	46 (1.8)	81 (3.2)	74 (2.9)	84 (3.3)	78 (3.1)	66 (2.6)	50 (2.0)	54 (2.1)	746 (29.3)
Average precipitation days (≥ 1.0 mm)	11	10	10	10	9	13	15	14	16	14	12	12	146
Source: Norwegian Meteorological Institute

== Transportation ==
The main road through Selbu is Norwegian County Road 705 that runs between Stjørdal Municipality, Selbu Municipality, and Tydal Municipality. Selbu is located near important destinations:

Destination	Distance	
Destination	kilometres	miles
Stjørdalshalsen	45	28
Trondheim Airport, Værnes	40	25
Trondheim	70	43
Ås (Tydal)	45	28
Røros	120	75

== Notable people ==
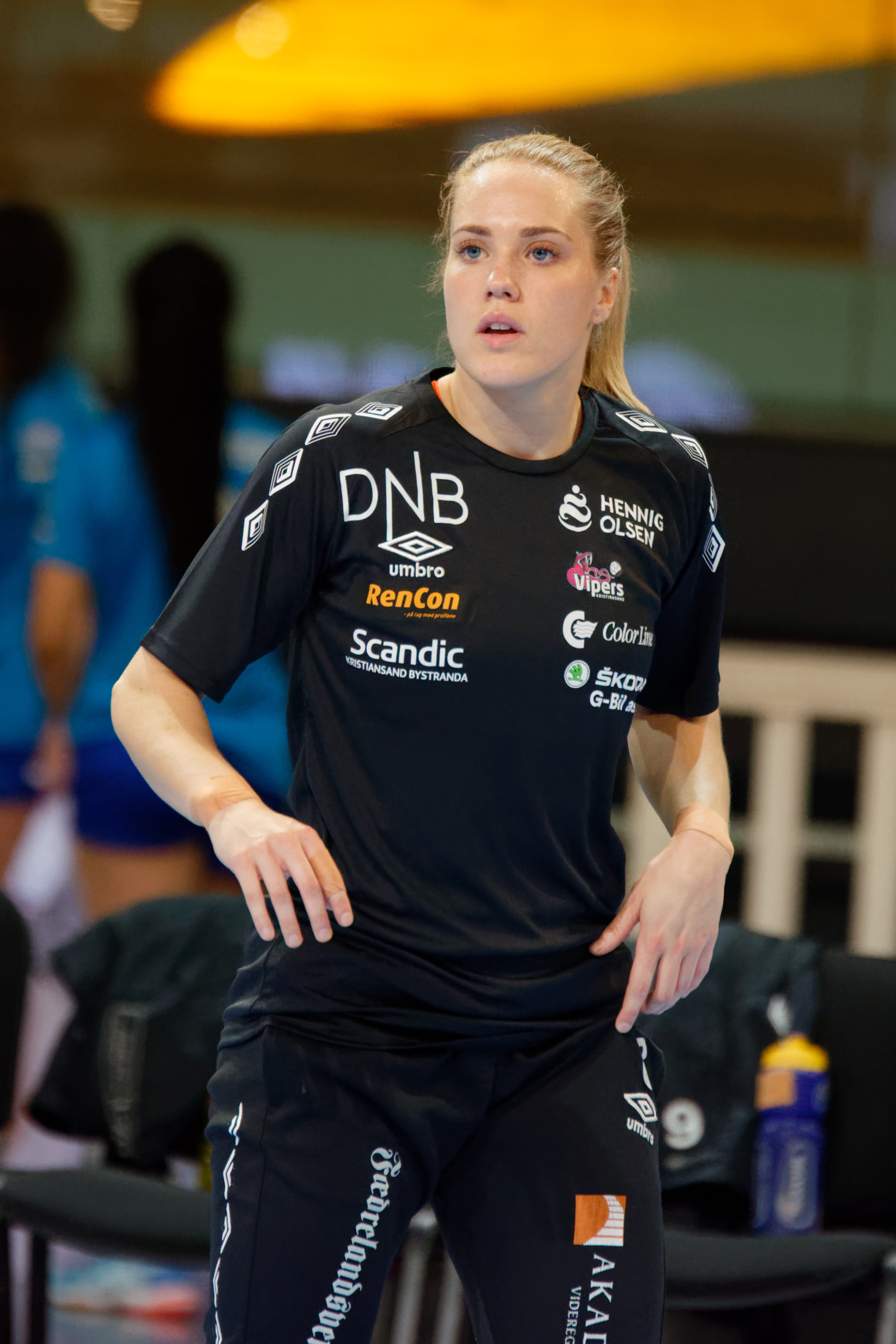
Malin Aune, 2018

- Marit Guldsetbrua Emstad (1841 in Selbu – 1929), an artist who created the Selburose knitting design
- Belle Gunness (1859 in Selbu – ca.1908), a Norwegian-American serial killer who was active in Illinois and Indiana between 1884 and 1908; she was thought to have killed at least fourteen people
- Peder Morset (1887 in Selbu – 1943), a teacher and Norwegian resistance member
- Per Almaas (1898 in Selbu – 1991), a teacher and politician and Mayor of Strinda before and after WWII
- Inga Balstad (born 1952 in Selbu), a Norwegian politician who was Mayor of Selbu in 2007
- Kjersti Synneva Moen (born 1995), a cartoonist and illustrator

=== Sport ===
- Hans Olav Sørensen (born 1942 in Selbu), a Norwegian former ski jumper who competed at the 1964 Winter Olympics
- Brit Stav (born 1944 in Selbu), a Norwegian archer who competed at the 1972 Summer Olympics
- Malin Aune (born 1995 in Selbu), a handball player for the Norway women's national handball team
