= Nea (river) =

River in Trøndelag, Norway

Nea; Ganka; Nean
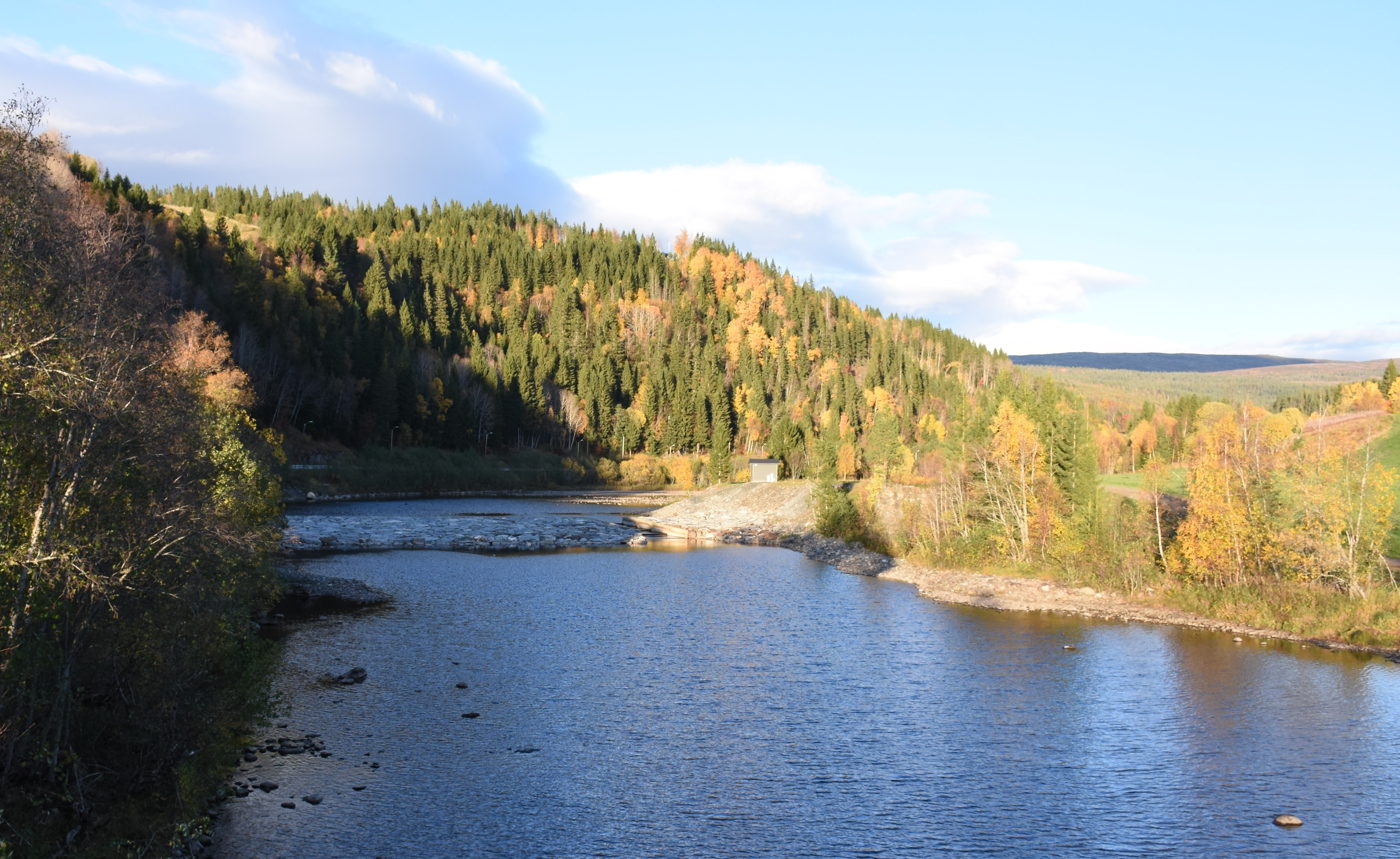
- Interactive map of the river

Location
- Countries: Norway, Sweden
- Counties: Trøndelag, Jämtland
- Municipalities: Tydal Municipality; Selbu Municipality; Åre Municipality; Berg Municipality

Physical characteristics
- Source: Sylsjön
  - location: Åre Municipality, Jämtland, Sweden
  - coordinates: 62°55′49″N 12°09′06″E
  - elevation: 851 metres (2,792 ft)
- Mouth: Selbusjøen at Mebonden
  - location: Tydal Municipality, Trøndelag, Norway
  - coordinates: 63°13′44″N 11°01′52″E
  - elevation: 157 metres (515 ft)
- Length: 80 km (50 mi)
- Basin size: 2,082.89 km^{2} (804.21 sq mi)
- Discharge
  - average: 70 m^{3}/s (2,500 cu ft/s)

Basin features
- River system: Nea-Nidelvvassdraget
- Tributaries
  - left: Rotla
  - right: Tya

The Nea (Norwegian), Ganka (Southern Sami), or Nean (Swedish), is a river in Norway and Sweden. The 80-kilometre (50 mi) long river runs through Berg Municipality and Åre Municipality in Jämtland county (in Sweden) and then Tydal Municipality and Selbu Municipality in Trøndelag county (in Norway). The river Nea is a part of the Nea-Nidelvvassdraget watershed. Some of the main villages along the river include: Østby, Ås, Aunet, and Gressli (in Tydal Municipality) and Flora, Hyttbakken, and Mebonden (in Selbu Municipality).

The river is first named Nean at the eastern end of the artificial lake Sylsjön, which lies in Åre Municipality and Berg Municipality in Sweden. Below the dam, the river flows for 6 kilometres (3.7 mi), crossing the Swedish-Norwegian border where the name becomes Nea, before entering the lake Nesjøen. On the downstream side of the lake, the river continues through the smaller lake Vessingsjøen before continuing on its westward course. At the municipal center of Ås the river Tya joins it. After that, it follows the Neadalen valley and meets the river Rotla about 15 kilometres (9.3 mi) east of the village of Mebonden where it ends when it flows into the lake Selbusjøen.

== See also ==
- List of rivers in Norway
