= Selbusjøen =

Lake in Trøndelag, Norway

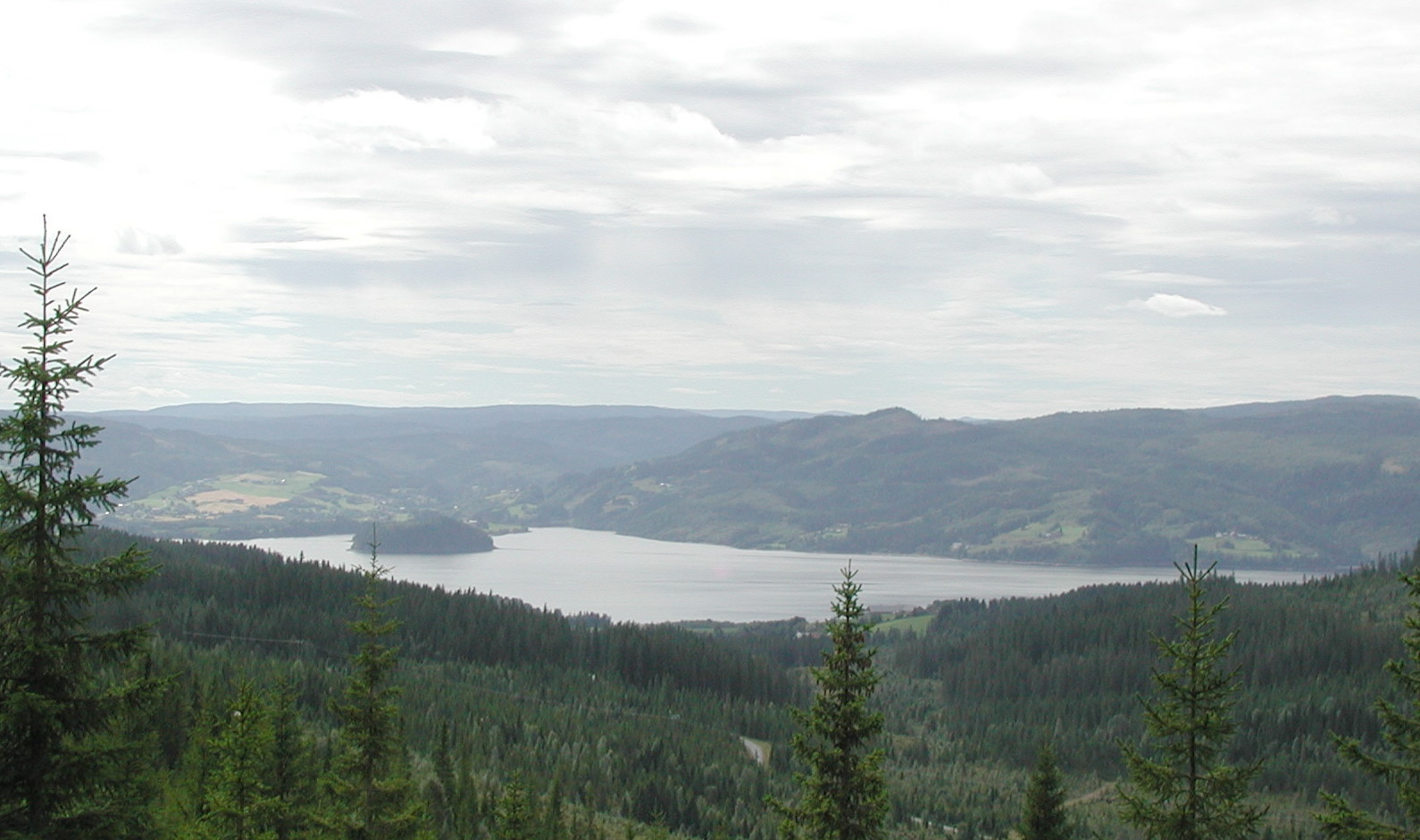
- Interactive map of the lake
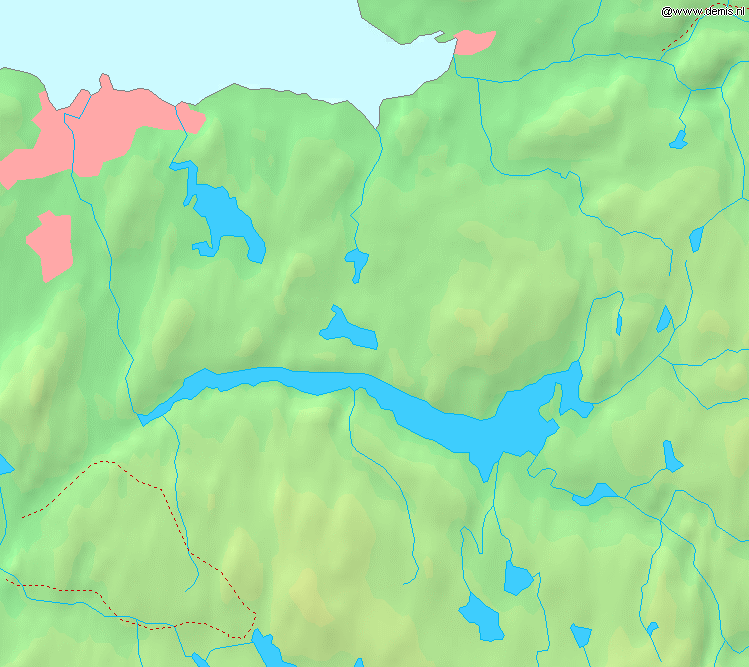
- Selbusjøen lies southeast of the city of Trondheim
- Location: Selbu Municipality and Trondheim Municipality, Trøndelag
- Coordinates: 63.2312°N 10.9484°E
- Type: glacial lake
- Primary inflows: Nea River
- Primary outflows: Nidelva
- Catchment area: 2,876.05 km^{2} (1,110.45 sq mi)
- Basin countries: Norway
- Max. length: 30 km (19 mi)
- Max. width: 4 km (2.5 mi)
- Surface area: 57.9 km^{2} (22.4 sq mi)
- Average depth: 70 m (230 ft)
- Max. depth: 206 m (676 ft)
- Water volume: 4.05 km^{3} (0.97 cu mi)
- Shore length^{1}: 110.81 km (68.85 mi)
- Surface elevation: 161 m (528 ft)
- Islands: Hoøya
- References: NVE
- ^{1} Shore length is not a well-defined measure.

Selbusjøen is the 17th largest lake in Norway. It is located in Trøndelag county, primarily in Selbu Municipality, although the western end of it lies in the neighboring Trondheim Municipality. The 57.9-square-kilometre (22.4 sq mi) lake is the largest lake in the southern part of Trøndelag county. Selbusjøen is part of the Nea-Nidelv watershed, with the Nea River flowing into it on the eastern end and the Nidelva River flowing out the western end. The deepest part of the lake reaches 206 m (676 ft) below the surface. The villages of Selbustrand, Fossan, Tømra, Trøa, Innbygda, Mebonden, Vikvarvet, and Sjøbygda are located on the shores around the lake.

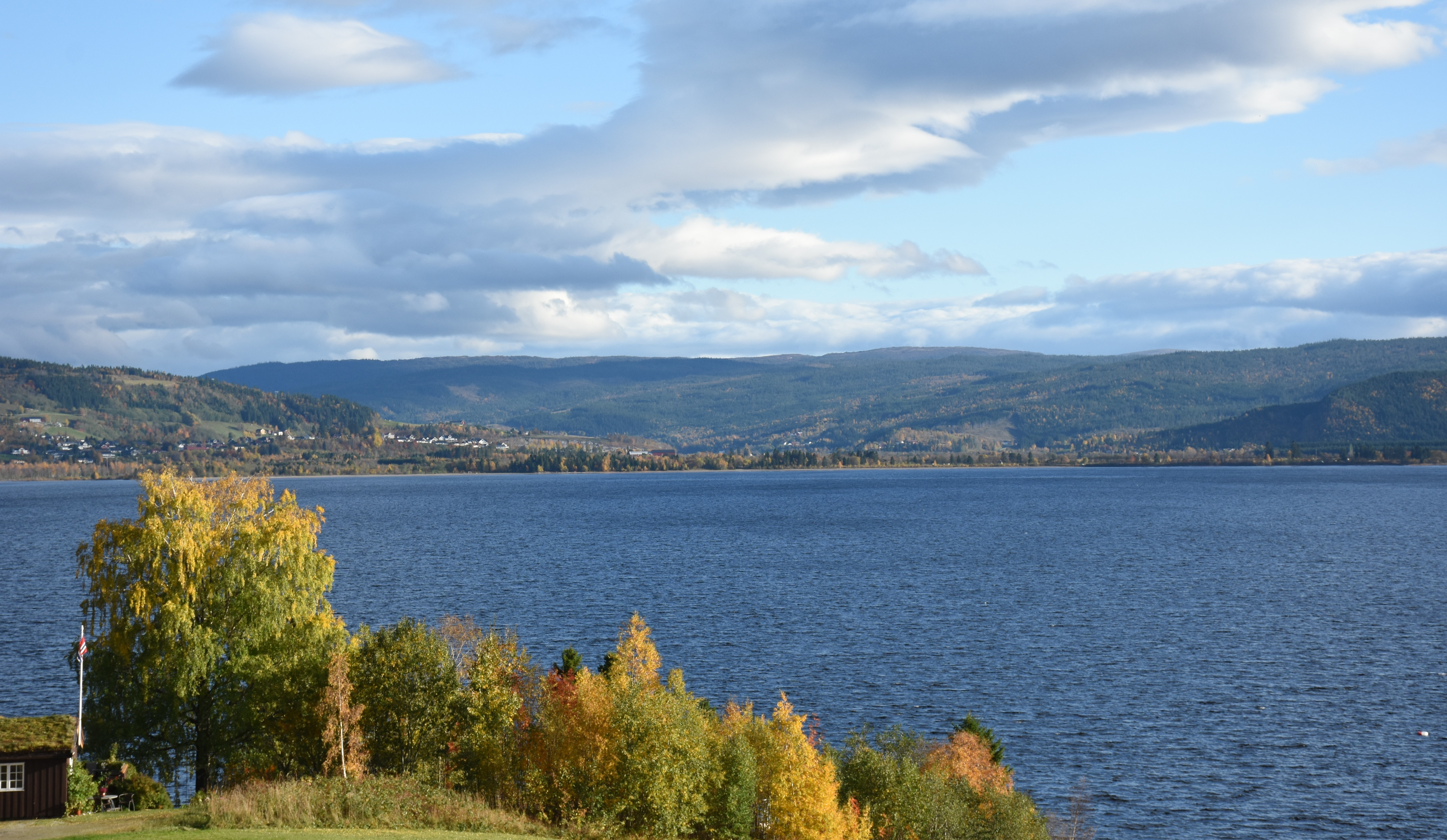
View of Selbusjøen

== See also ==
- List of lakes in Norway
