= Mebonden =

Village in Selbu Municipality, Norway

Mebonden Mebond
- Village
- Interactive map of Mebonden
- Location within Trøndelag Location within Norway
- Coordinates: 63.2303°N 11.0310°E
- Country: Norway
- Region: Central Norway
- County: Trøndelag
- District: Neadalen
- Municipality: Selbu Municipality

Area
  - Total: 1.4 km^{2} (0.54 sq mi)
- Elevation: 165 m (541 ft)

Population (2024)
  - Total: 1,112
  - Density: 794/km^{2} (2,060/sq mi)
- Time zone: UTC+01:00 (CET)
  - Summer (DST): UTC+02:00 (CEST)
- Post Code: 7580 Selbu

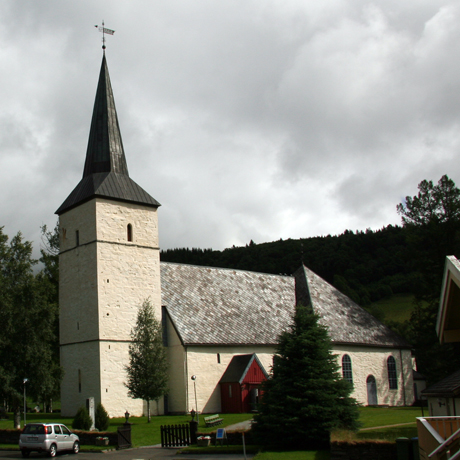
Selbu Church, Mebonden.

Mebonden is the administrative centre of Selbu Municipality in Trøndelag county, Norway. It is located at the eastern end of the lake Selbusjøen at the mouth of the Nea River. The villages of Vikvarvet, Hyttbakken, Innbygda, and Trøa surround the urban village of Mebonden. The 12th century Selbu Church is located in Mebonden.

The 1.4-square-kilometre (350-acre) village has a population (2024) of 1,112 and a population density of 794 inhabitants per square kilometre (2,060/sq mi).
