= Neadalen =

Valley in Trøndelag, Norway

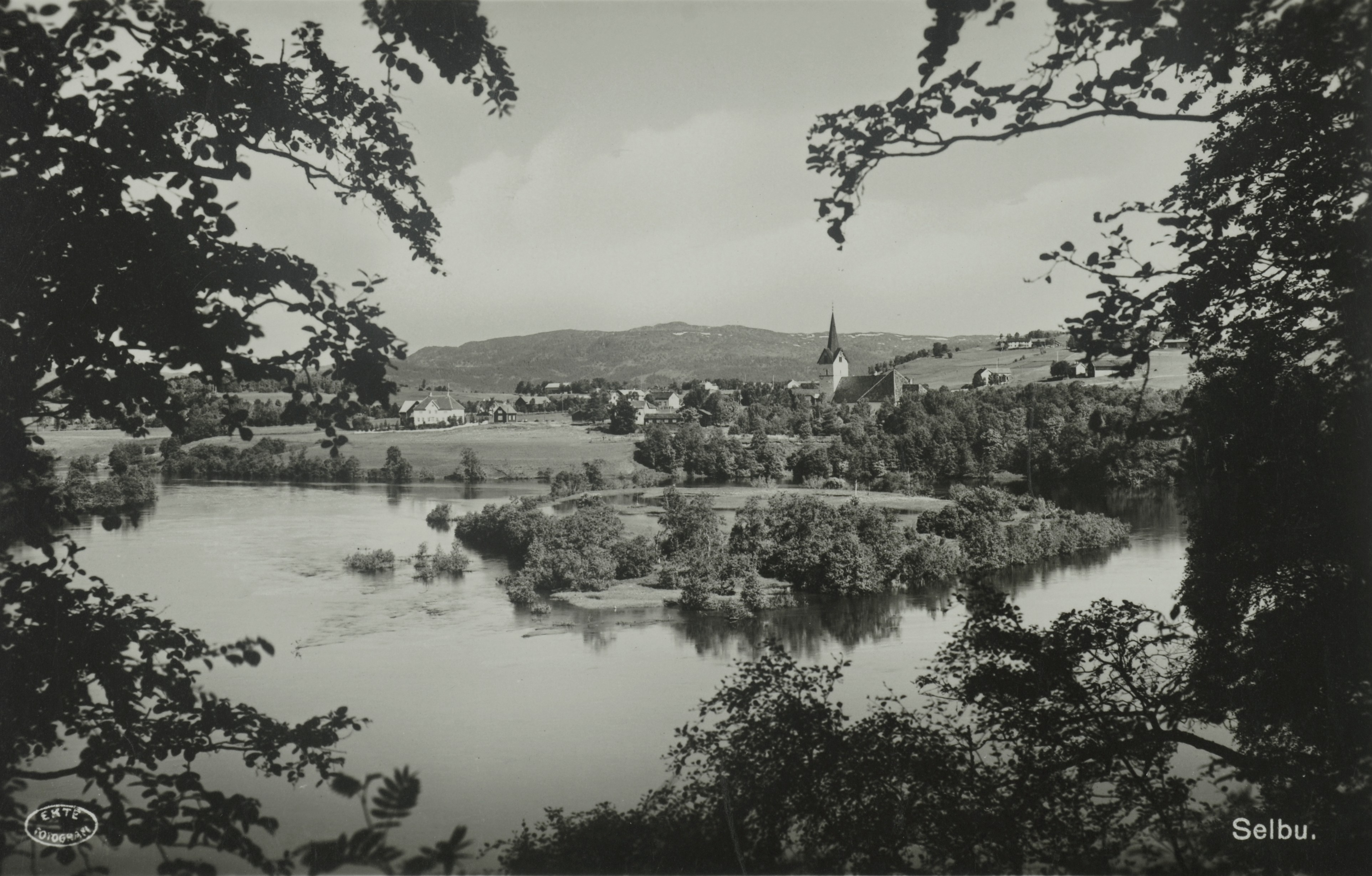
- View of Mebonden at the western end of the valley
- Length: 50 kilometres (31 mi)

Geology
- Type: River valley

Geography
- Location: Trøndelag, Norway
- Coordinates: 63.14925°N 11.23615°E
- River: Nea River

Location
- Interactive map of the valley

Neadalen is a river valley in Trøndelag county, Norway. The 50-kilometre (31 mi) long valley generally runs east to west through Tydal Municipality and Selbu Municipality. The valley begins at the large lake Nesjøen and it follows the Nea River to the west and it ends at the large lake Selbusjøen. The valley parallels the large Stjørdalen valley to the north and the Skarvan og Roltdalen National Park lies in the forested mountain area between the two valleys. Norwegian County Road 705 follows the river through the majority of the valley.

== Tydalen ==
In Tydal Municipality, the Tydalen valley branches off the main Neadalen valley and extends to the southeast. The river Tya flows through the Tydalen valley and empties into the Nea River at the village of Ås.
