= Norwegian knitting =

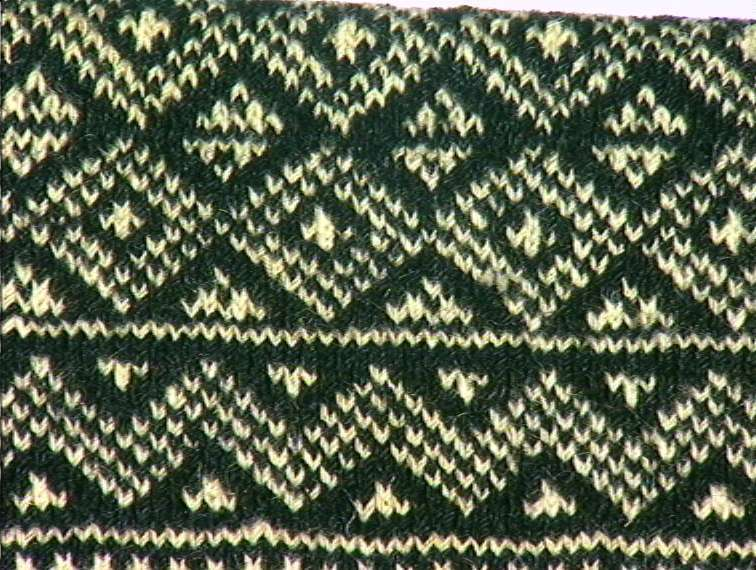
Lusekofte pattern

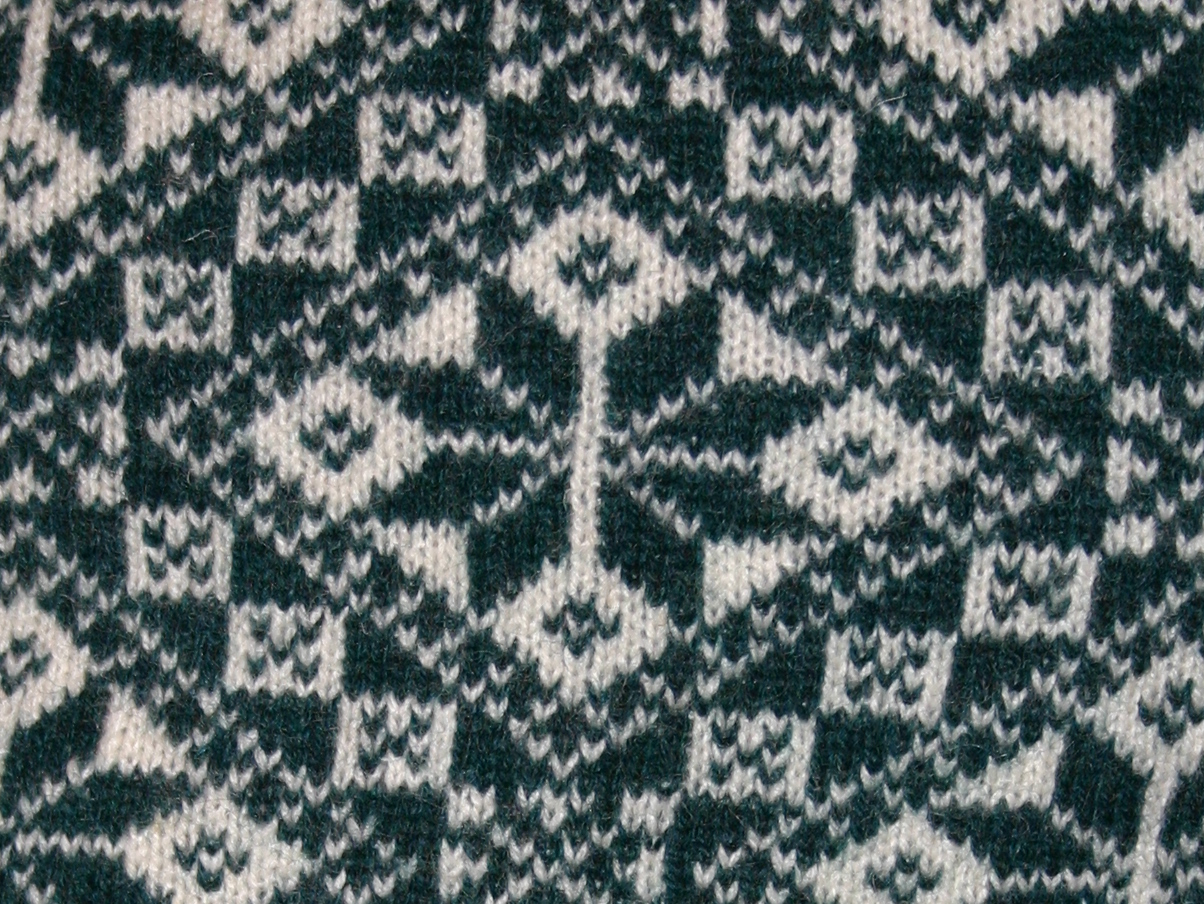
Selburose design

Norwegian knitting (Norwegian: strikking) has a history dating from the 16th century.

== History ==
Knitted garments found in Norway have been dated as far back as between 1476 and 1525. Some of the most well known sweater patterns attributed to Norwegian colorwork knitting are the Setesdal Lusekofte and the Fana Fanacofte patterns. Selbu in Trøndelag county is also well known for the Selburose pattern motif. Selbu mittens first appeared as a vertical column of two snowflakes on the front side of the mittens. The origin of these mittens is attributed to a young girl named Marit Emstad who in 1857 attended church wearing what we now know as Selbu mittens, effectively sparking the imagination of knitters at the time who had never seen anything like it before.

Today, there are over 300 registered mitten patterns attributed to Selbu. There are several brands of Norwegian yarn available today for knitters, including Sandnes Garn and Rauma Garn. Dale of Norway has been a manufacturer of ready-wear sweaters, which have been worn by Norway's Olympic athletes since 1956.

Many of their sweater patterns most closely associated with knitted ski sweaters have been published in English by the manufacturing company. The heritage of Norwegian knitting has been preserved, documented and translated into English language history, and pattern books, that are available to modern knitters, mostly notably by the author Annemor Sundbø. The yarn factory Rauma Ullvarefabrikk has also released a substantial number of Norwegian knitting patterns translated into English.

== See also ==
- Selburose
- Mariusgenser
- Lusekofte

== Other sources ==
- Janine Kosel; Sue Flanders; Laurann Gilbertson (2012). Norwegian Handknits: Heirloom Designs from Vesterheim Museum. (Voyageur Press). ISBN 978-0760342558.
- Annemore Sundbø (2001). Everyday Knitting: Treasures from a Rag Pile. (Torridal Tweed). ISBN 8299465710.
- Annemore Sundbø (2001). Setesdal Sweaters: The History of the Norwegian Lice Pattern. (Torridal Tweed). ISBN 8299465729.
- Annemore Sundbø (2007). Invisible Threads in Knitting. (Torridal Tweed). ISBN 978-8299465731.
- Annemore Sundbø; Carol Huebscher Rhoades (2010). Strikking i billedkunsten - Knitting in Art. (Torridal Tweed). ISBN 978-8299465755.
