= Verdensparken =

Park in Oslo, Norway

Coordinates: 59°56′40.823″N 10°53′46.302″E

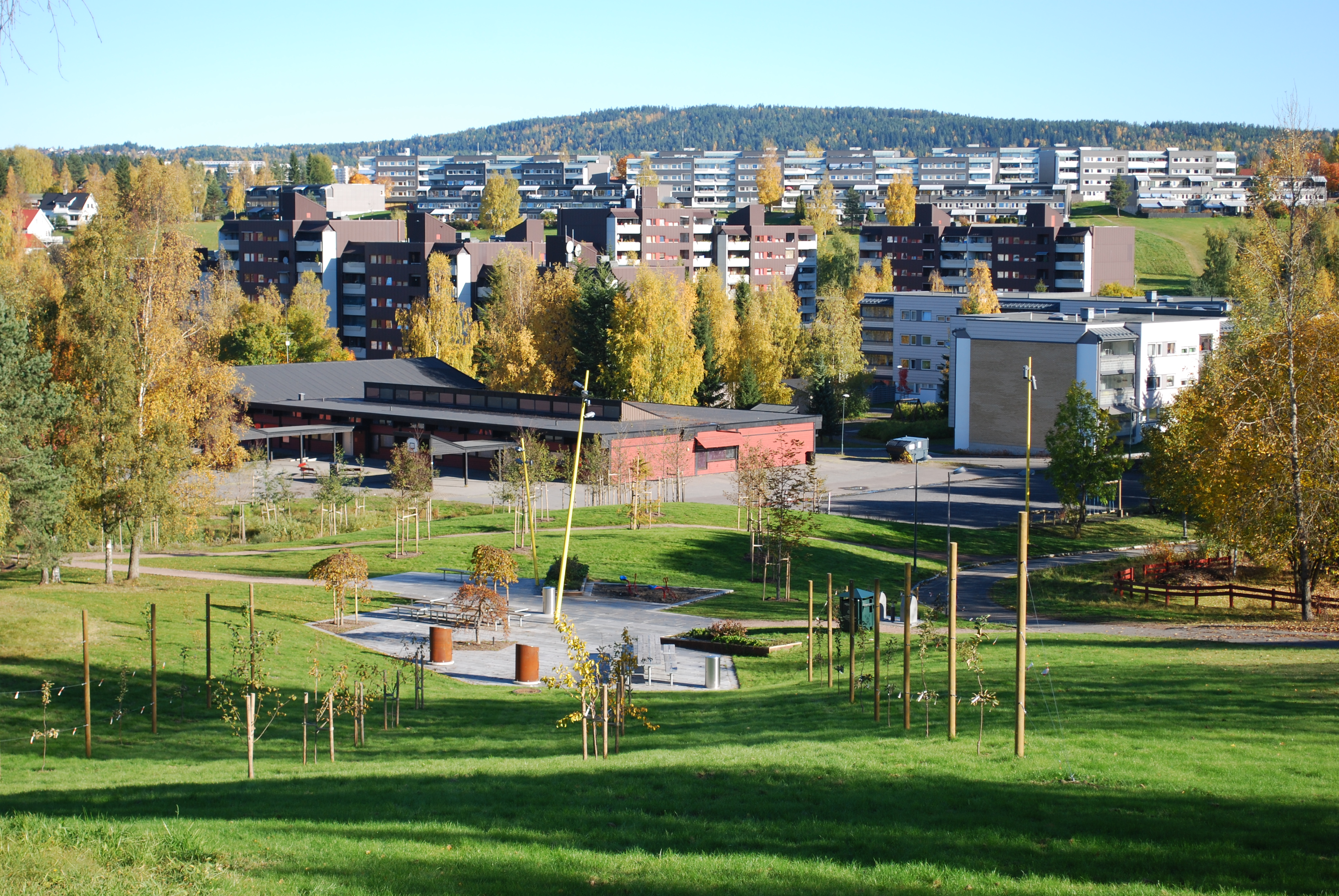
Area south of Verdensparken looking out over Gransdalen and Haugen

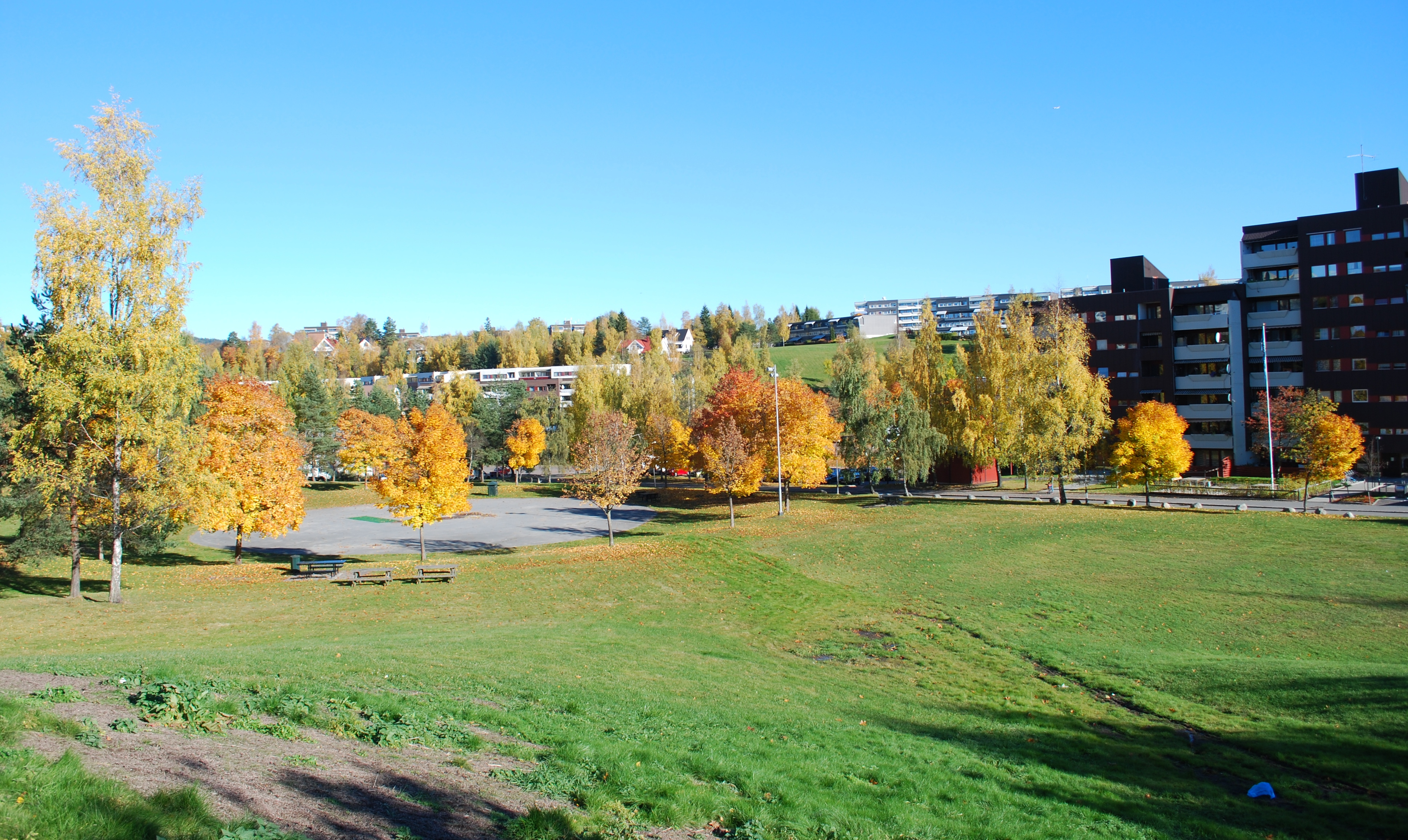
The future Verdensplassen, October 2013

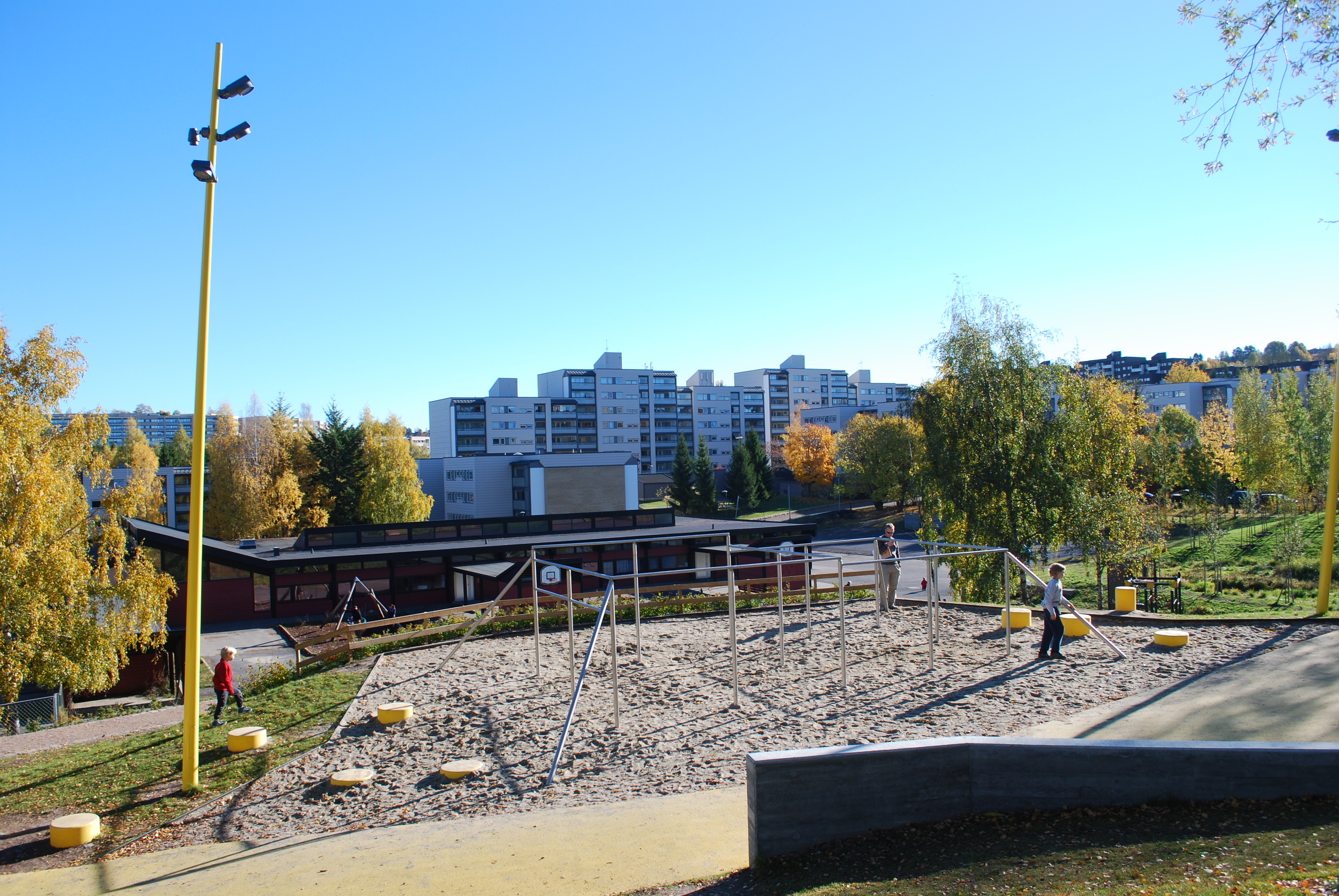
Part of the parkour course in the centre of the park

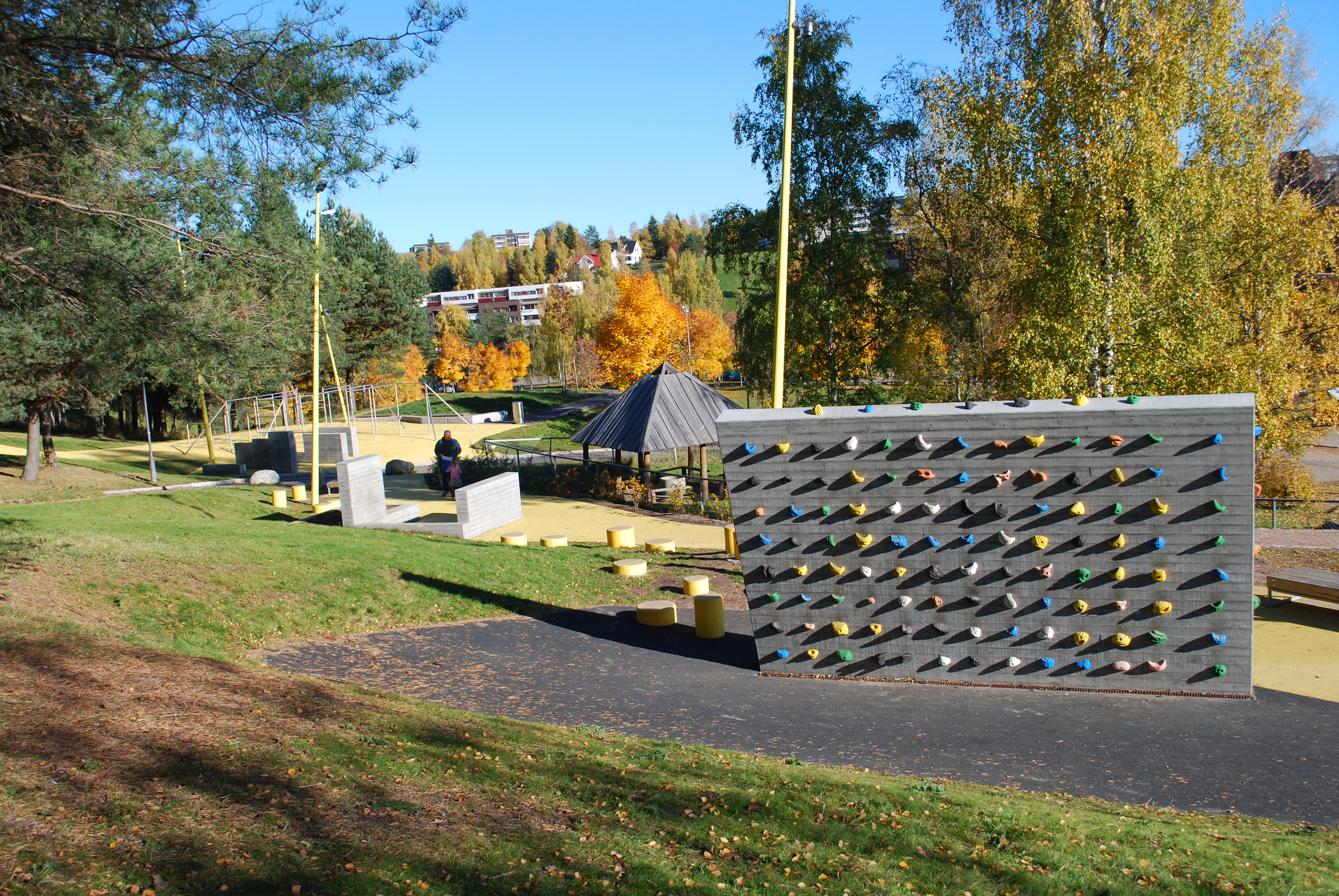
Part of the parkour course

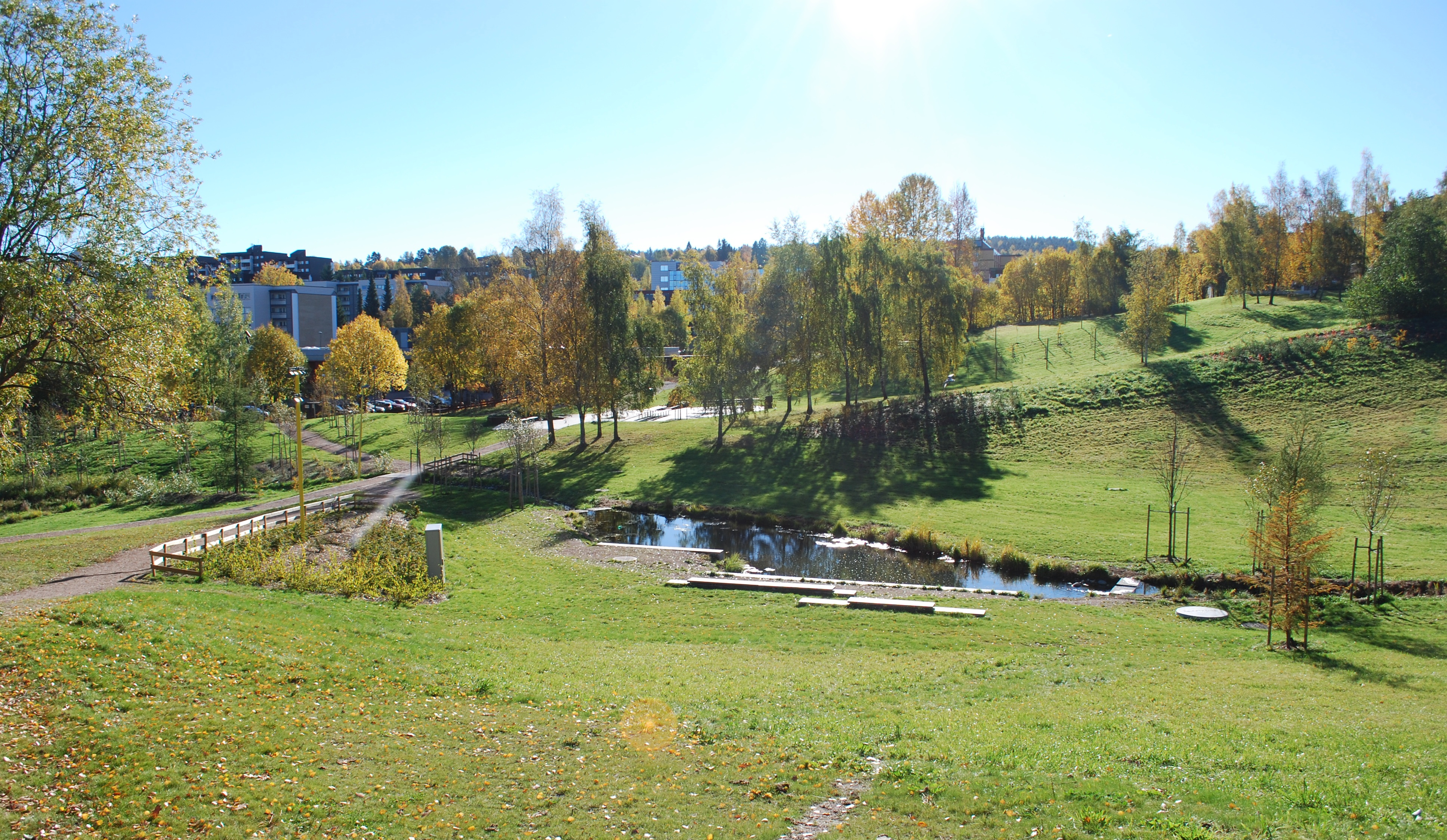
Ravine valley, stream and dam, looking south

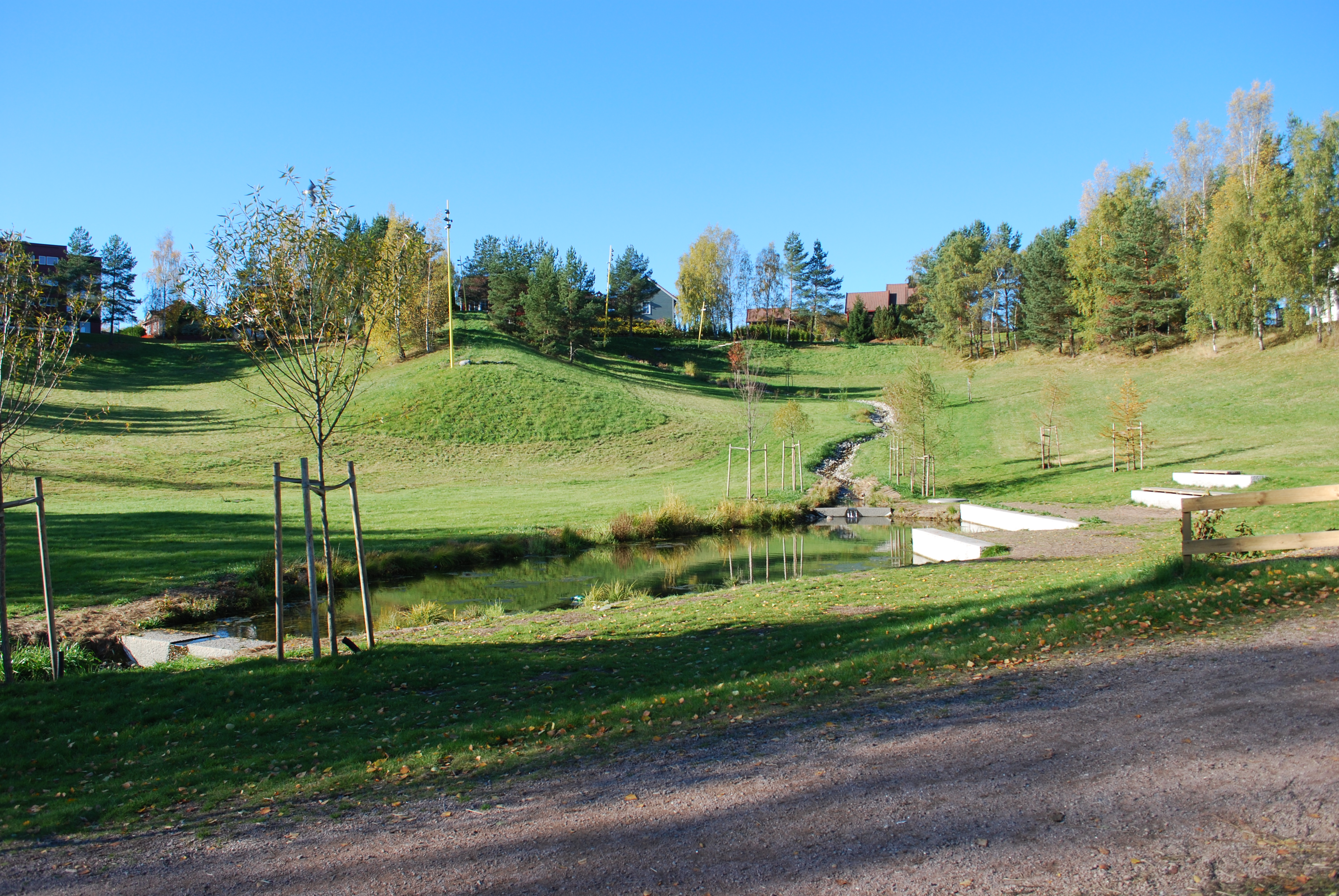
Ravine valley, stream, and dam looking west

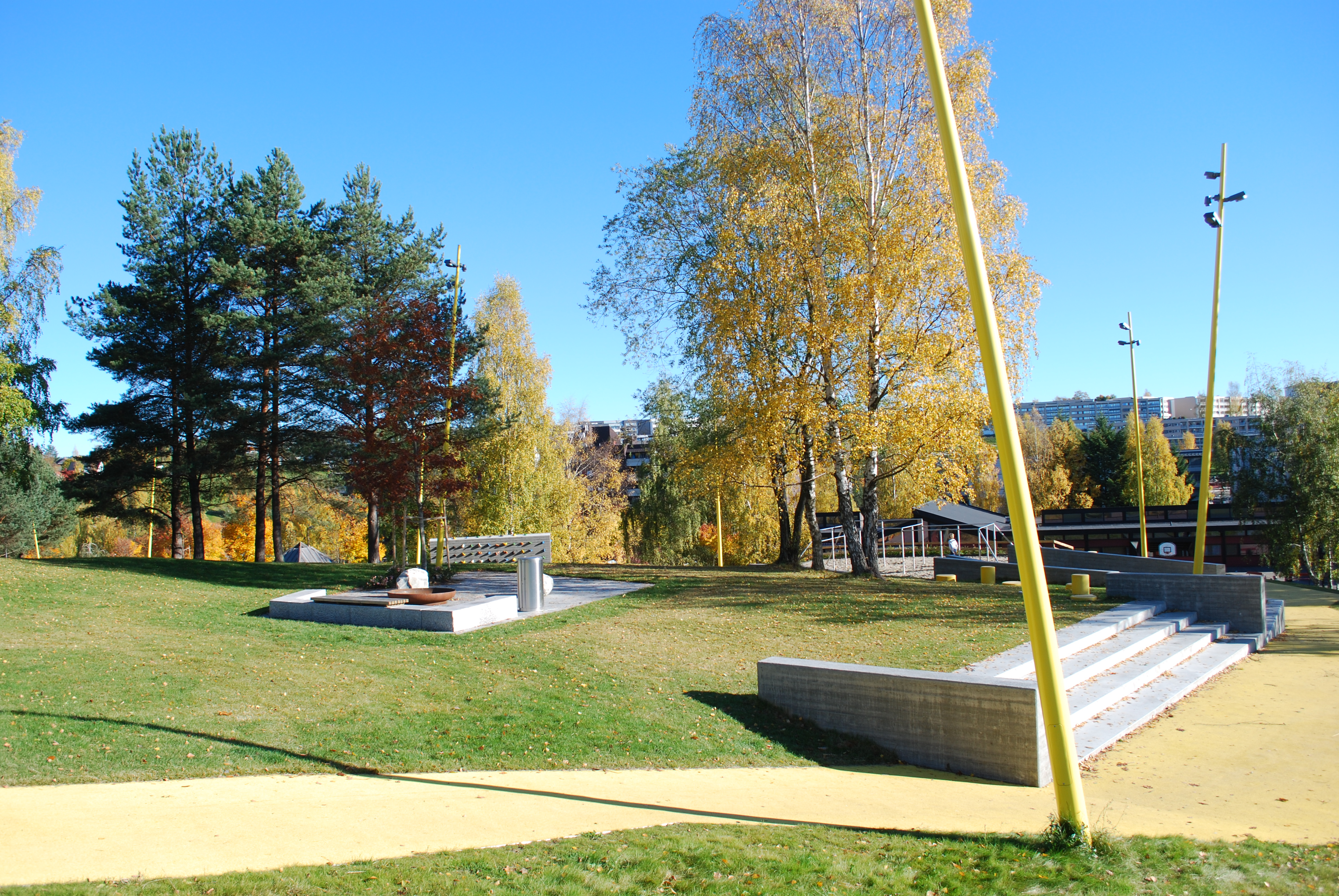
Seating area in the centre of the park

Verdensparken is a park on 5.2 hectares (52 decares; 13 acres) in Furuset, Oslo, Norway which opened in 2013 and was completed in 2014. The park reflects the population of the suburb of Furuset, where 63% of inhabitants had an ethnic origin other than Norwegian in 2009, and immigrants came from around 140 countries. In Verdensparken, there is a space to practice parkour.

== Location, landscape, and background of the new park ==
The park lies on the west side of Gransdalen in Furuset, west of the Furustien walkway which runs between Furuset centre and Gransdalen Road. The Vesterstien walkway runs through the park. The park is to the north and west of Gran school and Gran nursery Verdensparken is part of the walking route network as Vesterstien, which runs through the park, is a part of route D7, which runs from Furuset church to Stovner. Vesterstien is part of the Pilgrim's Route from the Middle Ages, which is now marked and recreated.

The park is in terrain with ravines forming oval landscapes south of the park area. The banks are covered with birch and pine trees which are partially planted. The grass banks follow the ravine forms and run over into short-trimmed lawns to the North and East. The vegetation is limited to a few species, mainly birch and pine, with a few poplars. Much of the vegetation was planted in the 1980s, when the suburb was first growing. The large spaces lacked intimacy, and were therefore not used much for picknicking, for example. The area of the park is mostly green space. The park was little used, and became a "green desert" with little variation in character and contents. The traffic on Furustien, which borders the park to the East, is likewise heavy, with 1400 people per day.

The layout of the park was based on a study undertaken in 2008, planning in 2009, and continued housing analysis through the project. The municipality consulted with residents of Furuset, with particular focus on seeking the needs and wishes of women and youths. . One of the most common requests from the people of Furuset was a good meeting place outdoors. Verdensparken is the first project in a new collaboration between the Norwegian State Housing Bank and the Norwegian Environment Agency (formerly the Directorate for Nature Management), on the improvement of the local area. The park is part of the area improvement for Furuset in the Groruddalssatsingen. Each of the four districts were given a new large park, and Verdensparken is Alna's park.

The name of the park reflects the cultural diversity of the suburb, joined with the UN's message of peace, and Trygve Lie, the UN's first general secretary, who grew up in Furuset.

== Layout of the park ==
The meeting places in the park link new and existing vegetation. The ravines create interesting spaces and soft spaces, which are used to make attractive meeting spaces and seating areas. The ravines also create areas for sports activities and physical exercise in the winter time.

Physical activities which were formerly linked to permanent spaces and organisations moved to open spaces in the park, and organise activities themselves. In Verdensparken, the municipality has supported the use of new green spaces.

The parkour areas (free running) are a project by Kragh & Berglund landscape architecture and urban design in Copenhagen. The most important elements of the space are concrete walls and staircases, padded rubber bins, plastic pads and rails. Parkour is not usually specially built in urban areas. The parkour area was opened by Environment Minister Bård Vegar Solhjell and councillor Bård Folke Fredriksen on 31 May 2013.

The park contains seven meeting places with paving and benches, barbecues, bonfires, fruit trees, and fruit and berry bushes. These are of varying sizes, and are located throughout the park. There is a roof over the long table in meeting place nr. 4. In one of the ravines in the middle of the park, there is a stream ending with a dam. On the dam, an amphitheater has been built with seating areas and stone artwork. A former track has been upgraded to a tourist route with paving. The first to be built were benches, fruit trees, seating areas and parkour equipment throughout the park. At the bottom of Verdensplassen is a lake landscape. The whole park is dealt with in a similar way, a mini-landscape with valleys, streams, rivers and bushes, reinforced by the use of natural elements such as stone, vegetation and water, but without typical play apparatus. Visual inspiration for this came from the Danish landscape architect Helle Nebelong, who has designed a variety of play areas and sensory gardens, including in Copenhagen. The overflow from the water areas leads into a stream to Gran school.

The lighting is provided by ÅF lighting. The lighting in Verdensparken has a distinctive and special design. In the amphitheater, stone benches look like a starry sky. Foot and cycle paths are lit without blending and have good colour separation. The lighting turns off at 11:00 p.m., so that the lights do not disturb the park's neighbours. The lighting was awarded the Norsk Lyspris 2013, and the jury wrote. "The way the light is used gives the park a new meaning in the evening, a new layer of meaning emerges at the time of darkness. The park is divided into different "experience zones", which contributes to variety, curiosity and movement."

Art is central to the design of Verdensplassen, which lies to the lowest, northeast, corner. The placement and size of the square make this area of the park more active, as it was previously a sad area of asphalt. Verdensplassen has its own character from site-specific art in combination with the creation of a social meeting place for people in the suburb and other arrangements. The floor of the square is made as a carpet of mosaic which is meant to reflect the people of Furuset, and inspirations include the Selburose, African graphics, and Persian carpets.

Verdensparken is 52 decares large, around 400 meters at the longest point North-South, and the ground is owned by the municipality. The park is regulated for free use, apart from a small area that is specifically a walking and cycleway. The park is financed by the state and the Directorate for Nature Management (from 2013 the Environment Directorate), Oslo municipality through the Groruddals initiative and the station and meeting places project, and the Sparebankstiftelsen DNB NOR. The park had a budget of 41 million kroner, and work was done in three stages. The builders were Oslo municipality through Frluftsetaten (later the City Environment Office) and Bydel Alna, the Open Air Office had the project lead, while Sundt and Thomassen landscape architects AS project managed the park.

== Literature ==
- «Verdensparken i Oslo. Landets første parkkouranlegg er åpnet.» Park & anlegg 6–2013, page 36–38.
- «Utvikling av Verdensparken.» Oslo kommune, Bymiljøetatens hjemmeside, 4 June 2012, no longer available.
