= Lopapeysa =

Traditional Icelandic wool sweater

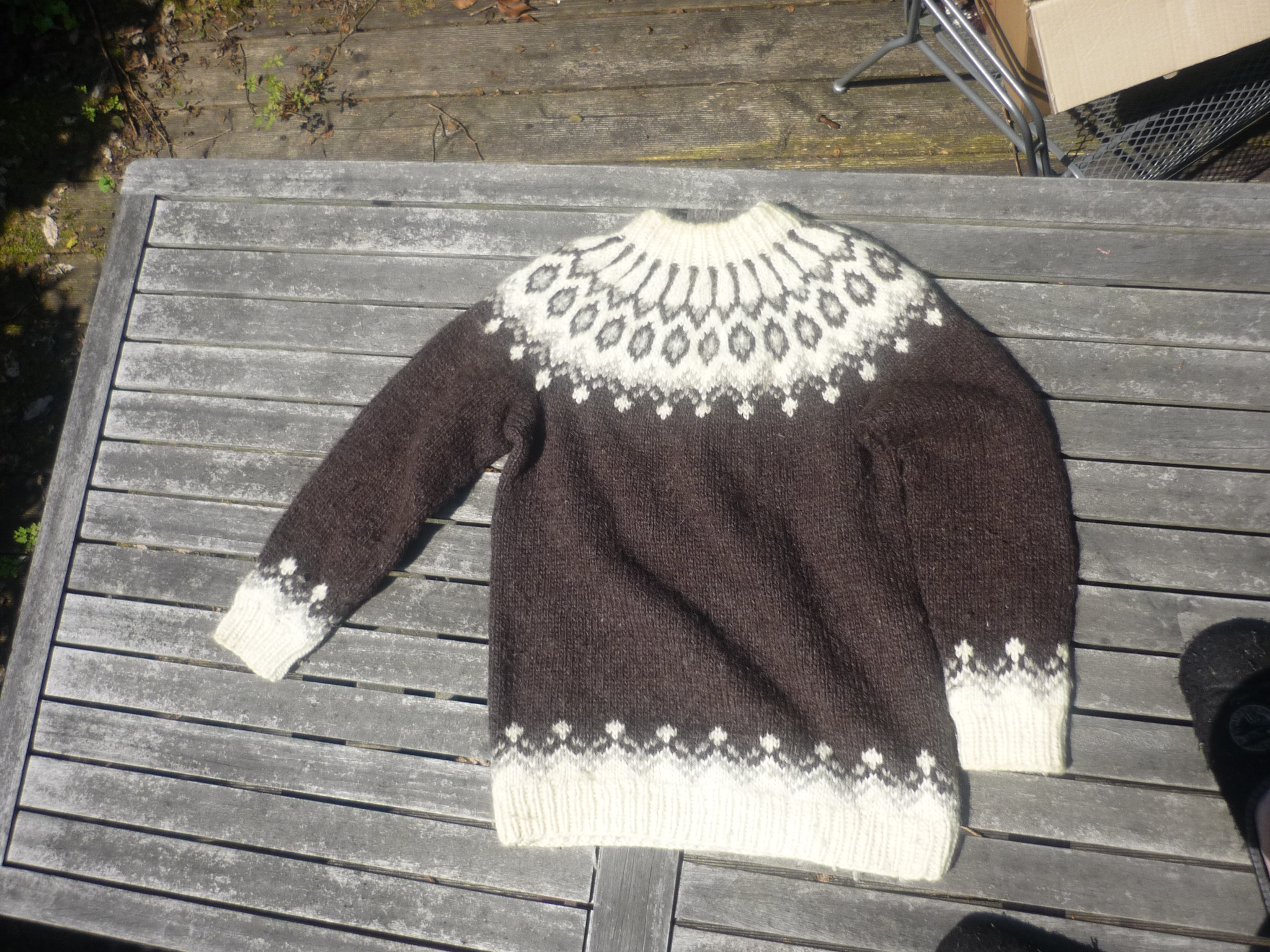
A lopapeysa

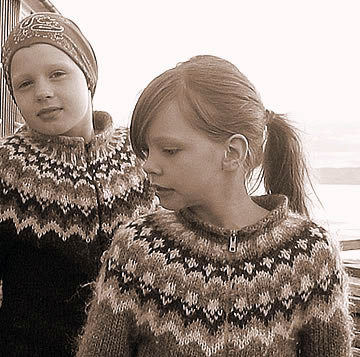
Icelandic girls wearing traditionally patterned lopapeysa sweaters

A lopapeysa (Icelandic: [ˈlɔːpaˌpʰeiːsa]) or Icelandic sweater is an Icelandic style of sweater originating in the early or mid-20th century, at a time when imports had displaced older and more traditional Icelandic clothing and people began to search for new ways to use the plentiful native wool. The design has since become a national icon for Icelandic cultural identity.

== Terminology ==
Lopapeysa (plural lopapeysur) is a compound word, from lopi, denoting the particular kind of single ply yarn traditionally used to make lopapeysur, and peysa 'sweater, jumper, pullover'. Thus the word literally means 'sweater made of lopi'.

== Design of the sweater ==
It is characterized by a yoke design – a wide decorative circle surrounding the neck opening. The sweater is knitted in a non-varying circle, meaning that there is no difference between the front and the back, unless a zipper is added. The body of the sweater is knitted using circular needles, while 'the sleeves are picked up onto the needle containing the bodice. The shaping of the shoulders by gradually casting off is incorporated into the pattern of the yoke'. The yarn used, lopi, is made from the wool of Icelandic sheep and contains both wind hairs and fleece. Icelandic wool has earned an international reputation for its warmth, lightness, and insulation abilities so that even when wet, it keeps the wearer warm.

The colors can be artificial, but undyed wool of various colors is available and much in demand. 'Originally, the sweater had a patterned band of at least two colours at the hem, the wrist and the yoke, forming the main pattern across the shoulders. During the 21st century, this changed so that now it is common for only the yoke to be patterned'.

== Characteristics of the wool ==
As a breed, the Iceland sheep is unique - the purity of the strain has been protected by centuries of isolation and a total absence of contact with others. By the same token, the wool it produces has no counterpart anywhere. Having evolved over 1,100 years of exposure to the sub-Arctic climate, Icelandic wool has a distinctive combination of inner and outer fibers. The outer fibers are long, glossy, tough and water resistant, while the inner ones are fine, soft and insulating, providing a high resistance to cold. A further striking characteristic of the Iceland sheep is its natural coloration: black, grey, and brown as well as the usual white. Together, these create the distinctive look of Icelandic knitwear, one of the best-known examples of which is the lopi.

== History ==
Knitting probably came to Iceland in the sixteenth century, but the lopapeysa originated in the early or mid-20th century, at a time when imports had displaced older and more traditional Icelandic clothing, industrial production was replacing hand-knitting, and people began to search for new ways to utilize the plentiful native wool and knitting skills. There has been widespread speculation about the origins and originators of the style (including suggestions of Greenlandic women's costume, or Aztec, Navajo, South American, Turkish, or Swedish textile patterns, and claims of original design by Auður Laxness).

Knitting historian Annemor Sundbø has shown that the design can be traced to a knitting pattern called "Eskimo" that was published by Norwegian designer Annichen Sibbern in women's magazine URD nr 48 in 1930. Her design was inspired by Danish-Norwegian movie "Eskimo" where the character Eukaluk was wearing a Greenlandic Inuit costume with beaded yoke. The design became a big success and source of inspiration for a huge number of variations around the same idea.

In the wake of Icelandic full independence from Denmark in 1944, the lopapeysa increasingly became an invented tradition and a symbol of national identity. The lopapeysa has seen two main peaks in fashion: in the two or three decades following Icelandic independence from Denmark in 1944 and then again in the early 21st century as globalisation challenged the national identity. It and other goods inspired by it are in the twenty-first century also widely marketed to tourists in the country.

== See also ==
- Mariusgenser
- Lusekofte
- Selburose
- Þjóðbúningurinn - Icelandic national costume
- Icelandic tail-cap
