= Lopi (knitting) =

Knitting wool from Icelandic sheep

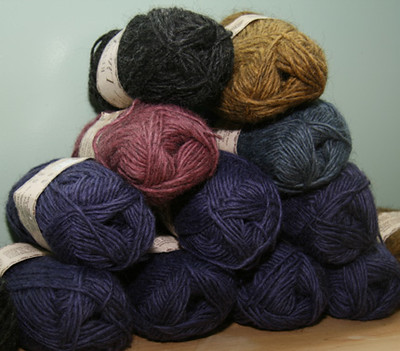
Skeins of lopi yarn.

Lopi (Icelandic: [ˈlɔːpɪ]) is knitting wool made from the fleece of Icelandic sheep. The fleece is made up of two layers, each with a different kind of wool. The wet-resistant outer coat contains long, coarse fibres, while the insulating layer beneath consists of soft, short fibres. These are processed together to create lopi roving and yarn.

== History ==
The machine-carded roving is produced in disc-shaped rolls. The original unspun lopi was first used for knitting c.1920s. More recently, lightly spun lopi yarn in different thicknesses has become available.

Most wool produced in Iceland is processed by Ístex, the Icelandic Textile Company. They manufacture 7 types of spun lopi yarn and also unspun lopi, all in a variety of natural fleece shades and in a range of dyed colours. The yarn is available in stores in Iceland and all over the world.

== Usage ==
Characteristic Icelandic lopapeysa sweaters are generally made from the thicker lopi yarns.
