= Mariusgenser =

Norwegian sweater with traditional-style patterns

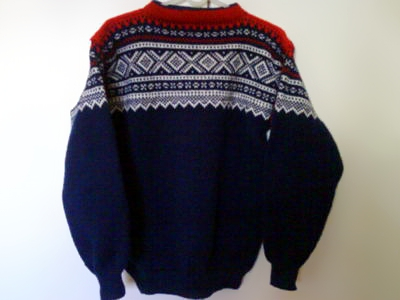
Marius Sweater is a sweater named after World War II flying ace and skier Marius Eriksen

Marius sweaters (Norwegian: Mariusgenser) are Norwegian-style knitted sweaters with patterns inspired by traditional Setesdal sweater (Norwegian: Setesdalsgenser), but without lice, a type of pattern. While the traditional sweaters used the natural colors of sheep wool - black, gray, brown and white - Marius sweater designs incorporated colors, with the most common being red, white and blue, the colors of the Norwegian flag.

== Origin ==
The origin of the sweater has been subject to dispute in media. Designer Unn Søiland Dale said she designed the pattern in 1953, influenced by traditional Norwegian knitting patterns found in the 1929 book Norske Strikkemønstre (Norwegian knitting patterns) by Annichen Sibbern. She sold the legal rights to distribute the hand-knit pattern the same year to Sandnes Uldvarefabrik for 100 Norwegian kroner. Designer Bitten Eriksen said she designed the pattern in the later 1920s, also inspired by the book by Sibbern, and that she in the beginning of 1950s had hired women who hand-knitted the sweater for sale in her shop. Erisen's daughter-in-law Bente Eriksen has said she was present when Dale visited Bitten Eriksen to learn the pattern Dale strongly disputed Bitten Eriksen's version, as does Dale's daughter, Vigdis Yran Dale, who currently holds the rights to the pattern for most commercial use.

== Popularity ==
Textile arts expert Annemor Møst estimated in 1999 that about 3,5 million copies of the knitting pattern had been sold and in 2008 estimated the number to be around 5 million and the number of sweaters that has been knitted based on the design as possibly multiple times more. Sandnes Uldvarefabrik estimated in 2011 that it had sold over five million copies of the pattern in a variety of color combinations.

The late King of Norway Harald V and former Prime Minister Gro Harlem Brundtland are among those who have worn the sweater publicly.

== See also ==
- Lusekofte
- Lopapeysa
- Selburose

== Literature ==
- Vigdis Yran Dale, author Marius knitting Juritzen publishers, Oslo 2012, ISBN 82-8205-300-7
- Vigdis Yran Dale, author Marius inspiration Tiger Publishing House, Oslo 2014, ISBN 978-82-999641-1-1
