= Marit Emstad =

Norwegian knitter (1841–1929)

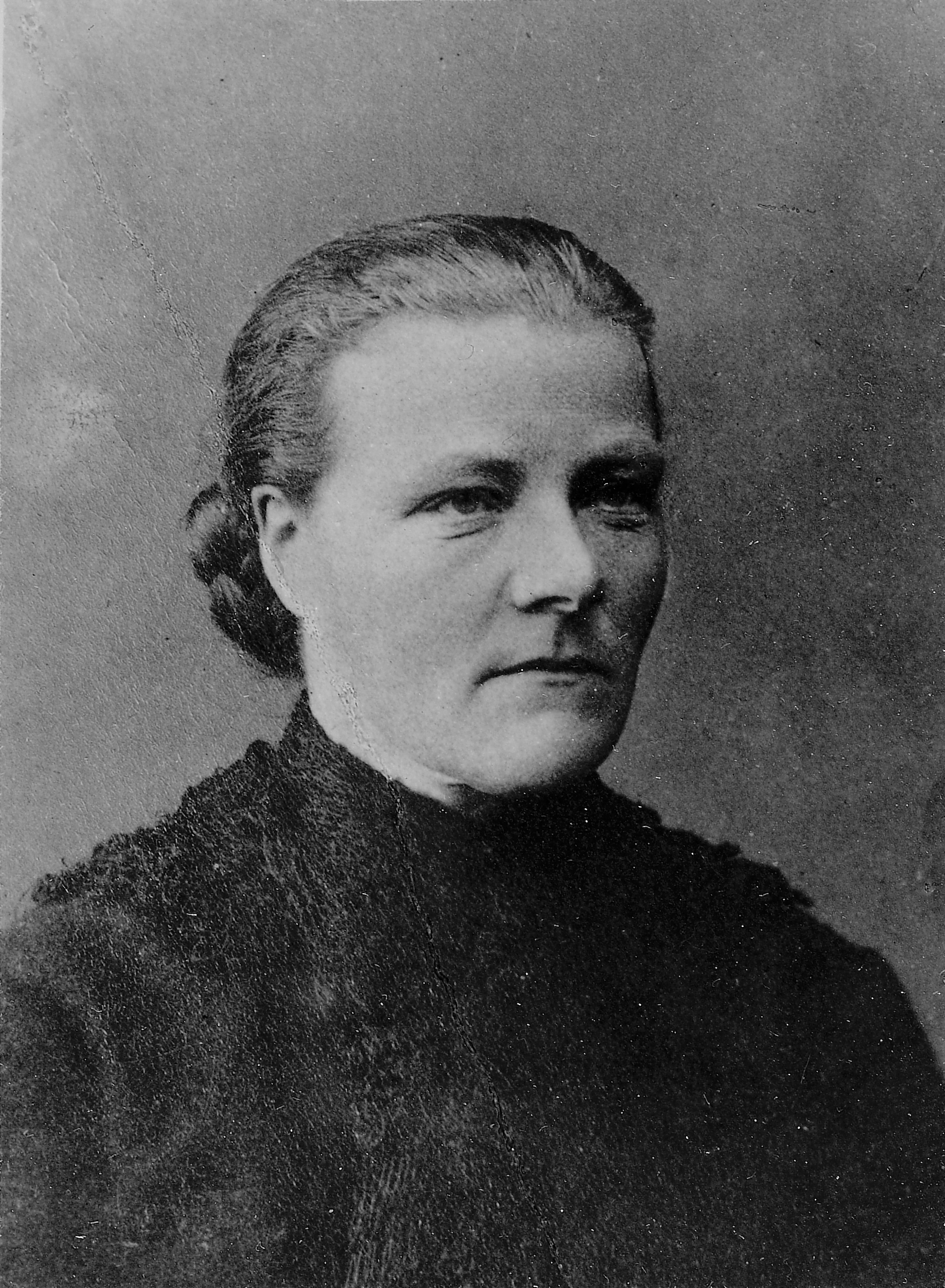
Undated photograph of Emstad

Marit Emstad (Note: First name also spelt Mærit; maiden name Guldseth has also been spelt Guldset, Gullset, Gullseth, Gullsethbrau, and Gulsetbrun.) (1841–1929), also known as Marit Guldsetbrua Emstad, was a Norwegian knitter from Selbu credited for inventing Selbu's two-colored mittens, Selbuvotter, as a teenager. She sold the first pair of Selbuvotter to the Trondheim Husflid (Note: Husflid directly translates in English to the Norwegian Arts and Craft Organization) in the 1890s, during which time she became known for her knitting and her role in the knitting-based cottage industry in Norway. She participated in exhibitions, including the 1914 Jubilee Exhibition in Oslo. Posthumously, the Selbu Husflidscentral awarded a silver medal in her name to other knitters in Neadalen and Emstad herself became known as the mother of Selbu-style knitting.

== Life ==
Marit Guldseth was born in 1841 to Ola Nillsen of Andersgarden and Anne Olsdatter Kjønes Oppigarden. Marit was the third of their seven children. At some point, she married Per Ingebriktsen Flønnesaut and became Marit Flønes; later in life she took the name "Emstad" from her married daughter, after moving in with her. She died in 1929.

== Knitting ==
As a teenager, sometime between 1854 and 1856, Marit Emstad was working as a servant or goat herder for farmer Jo Kjønes when somebody (Note: The identity of the other knitter has been given as the elderly Ragnhild Kulset or the Kjønes's other young servant girl Marit Sessengsjari, name also given as Ingbaer Sessengsjare) made him stranded wristwarmers and stockings with black and white patterning on the legs as a Christmas present. Kjønes asked Marit if she could make something "as pretty". Marit spent the next year practising with her sisters, and eventually made a pair of white mittens with a black, eight-pointed star. The star was inspired by patterns she had seen on a bridal headcovering (storbrurplagget) in addition to, according to Sheila McGregor, patterns Emstad would have likely seen in other knitted pieces and woodcuttings.

The next year, which was between 1855 and 1857, she and her sister wore the mittens they had knitted to the church in Selbu, as was common practice during the time. The other women at church found the mittens attractive, and Marit and her sister taught the eight-pointed star to friends and neighbors. They began incorporating the design, later known as the selburose, in other garments, and it became very popular in the municipality of Selbu. Knitted mittens with selburoses known as Selbuvott, became more popular than the region's traditional nålebinding mittens, to the point where they replaced them. They also enjoyed popularity as wedding gifts. Each women attending a wedding would make a pair of the mittens for display during the wedding. Afterwards, the bride would distribute the mittens amongst the men, giving the mittens knitted by married women to their husbands.

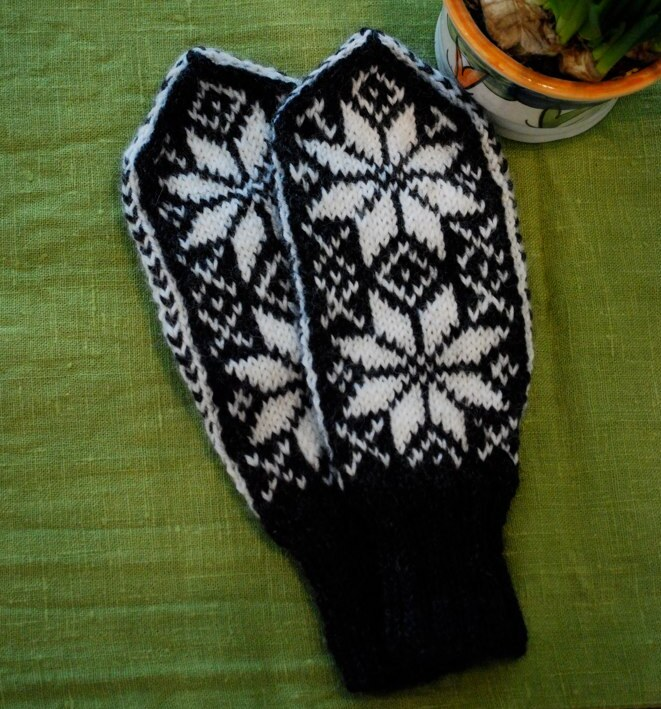
Black and white Selbuvotter with the eight-pointed design

Commercial production of garments with selburoses, particularly mittens began in the 1890s, organized in Selbu by Marit Emstad. In 1897, she sold the first pair of stranded mittens to the Trondheim Husflid. During this time, she was becoming more widely known in Norway for her knitting and her role in the knitting-based cottage industry. In 1912, at the age of 71, she took part in the "Home Arts Craft Exhibition for Trondhjem's Foundation" and was one of the three Selbu knitters awarded a cash prize for her knitting. Two years later, she participated in the 1914 Jubilee Exhibition in Oslo and won a certificate for her knitting, weaving, and yarn.

In 1926 or 1927, shortly before her death, Peder Morset wrote an article for the Trondheim newspaper about the history of knitting in Selbu, including Marit Emstad's life and work.

== Legacy ==
Marit Emstad posthumously became known as the "mother of two-color knitting" or mother of Selbu-style knitting in Norway. She is credited in tradition as the first knitter to place selburoses on mittens, a style which became known as Selbuvott. The Emstadrosa, the type of selburose she originated, was named after her family. On the 150th anniversary of the Selbu mitten's creation, the Selbu Husflid, Selbu Husflidsl, and Selbu Bydemuseum awarded a certificate named for Emstad.

=== Marit Emstad Medal ===
The Marit Emstad medal was a silver medal given by the Selbu Husflidscentral between 1965 and 1971 to knitters "who had made especially valuable work for promoting good home crafts and small industry in Neadalen". The medal was designed by silversmith Eiliv Overvik, and it was given to a total of 26 people, including 17 women and three men from Selbu.
