= Lusekofte =

Traditional Norwegian sweater

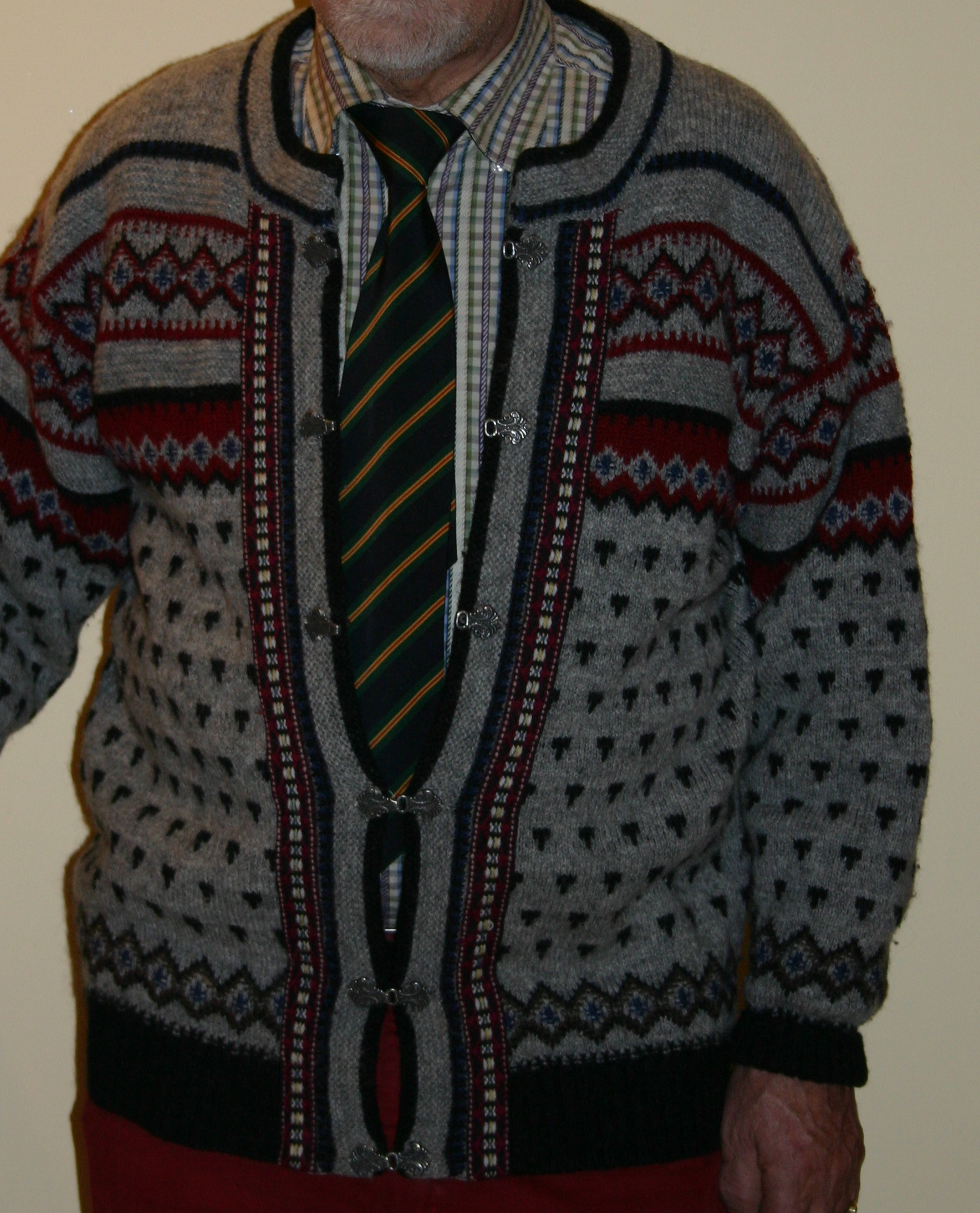
Lusekofte cardigan.

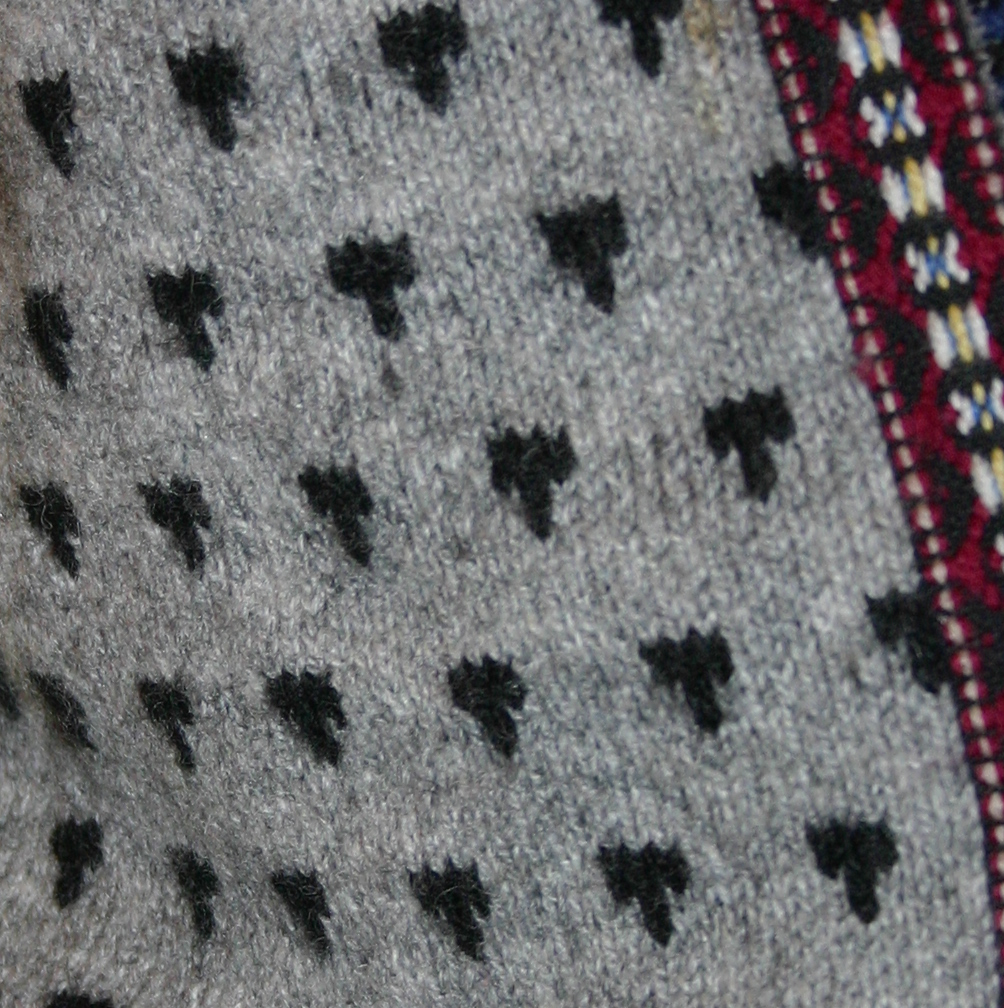
Detail of lusekofte pattern.

The lusekofte (Norwegian: [ˈlʉ̀ːsəˌkɔftə], lice jacket), also called the Setesdalsgenser (Setesdal sweater) is a traditional Norwegian sweater, dating from the 19th century.

The original sweater features a black and white design, the name referring to the isolated black stitches. They may also feature selburose designs. In recent times additional color is sometimes given to this black and white sweater by woven ribbons or bands of black woolen fabric embroidered in the type of colorful designs also found in the bunads and in rosemaling around the neck and along the front opening. These front opening are usually closed by a row of pewter or silver clasps.

After the lusekofte was discovered by tourists in the 1920s, it became very popular and today they are made in many different patterns and colours in addition to the traditional Setesdal sweater.

The lusekofte is casual attire, traditionally mostly worn by men.

== See also ==
- Mariusgenser
- Lopapeysa
- Intarsia
