= Selburose =

Norwegian knitted rose pattern

The coat of arms of Selbu, featuring three selburoses

Selbuvotter, Selbu mittens, featuring the selburose

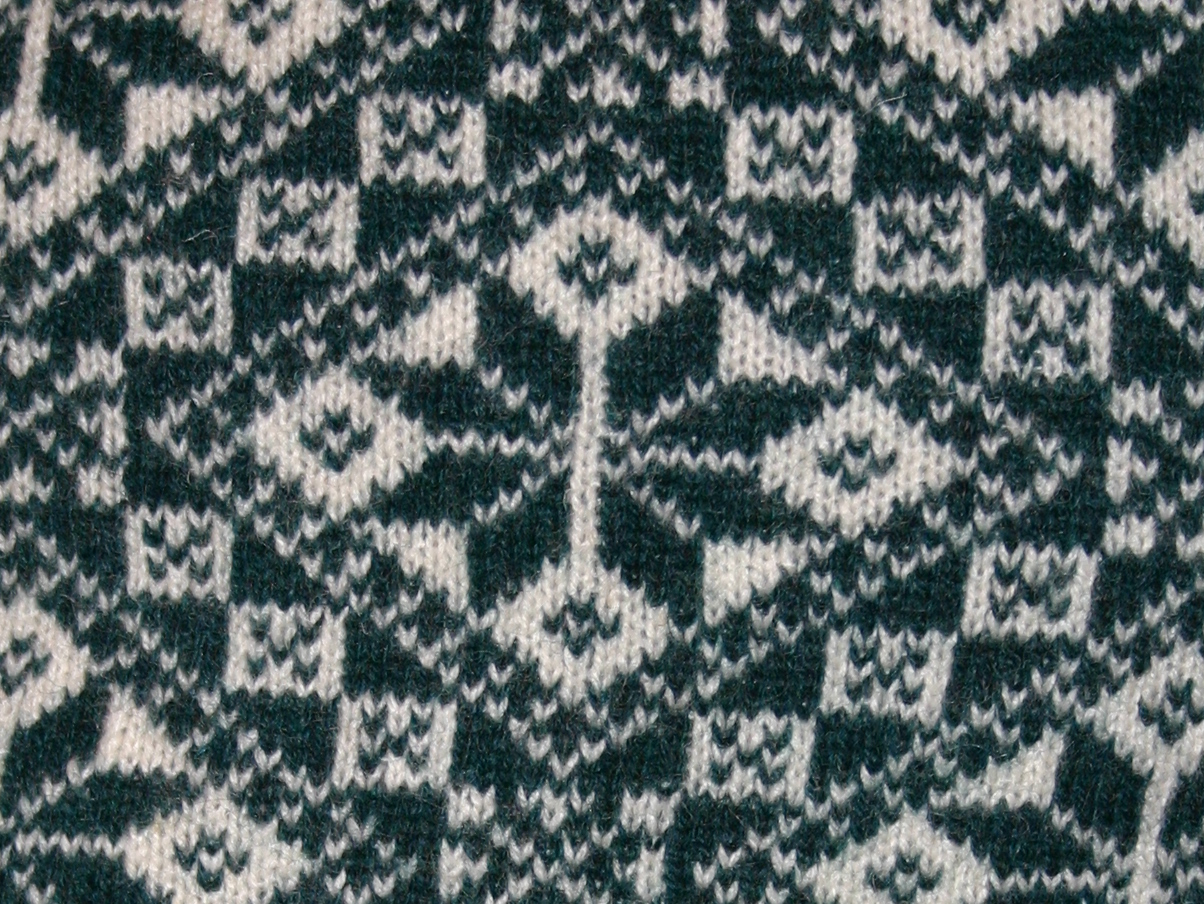
Detail of the pattern on a sweater

In Norwegian knitting, a selburose (Norwegian: [ˈsæ̀ɽbʉˌɾuːsə]), also known as an åttebladrose or an eight-pointed star is a knitted rose pattern in the shape of a regular octagram. It is traditionally used for winter clothing such as the Selbu mitten (selbuvott) and sweaters (lusekofte, lopapeysa and mariusgenser). Of ancient origin, the pattern is associated with Selbu Municipality in Norway, and has become an international symbol of Norway (or Scandinavia generally), Christmas, and winter.

== History ==
The design now known as the selburose has a long history. It appears in textiles across European history, and in knitting pattern books from Italy, France, Switzerland and Germany in the 16th to 18th century. It appears to combine designs of Islamic and Christian tradition based on Coptic and Byzantine art, or even the Sumerian Star of Ishtar. In Norway, the pattern was already in use prior to 1857 on sweaters from Western Norway based on Danish designs.

Marit Guldsetbrua Emstad (born 1841), a young woman from Selbu, popularized the design in 1857 when she knitted three pairs of mittens with an eight-petalled rose design (åttebladrose) and took them to church. She may have been inspired by stockings knitted by Marit Sessenggjerdet, a woman working for the same employer. The design became immediately popular in Selbu. The Norwegian Arts and Craft Club (Husflidslag) spread the selburose mitten fad across the country after 1910. By the 1930s, 100,000 pairs were made in Selbu every year. By 1960, much of the town's economy depended on the trade.

The popularity of the design in Norway may have been helped by the desire to establish a Norwegian national identity as the decades-long process of Norwegian independence from Sweden had nationalist leaders searching for the country's "true spirit". The bold, "uniquely Norsk" design of the selburose fit these aspirations. Norwegian girls were taught to knit the pattern, as a pair of selbuvotter became the traditional gift of a girl to her fiancé and his friends. The home industry of Selbu mitten knitting helped make Norwegian farming life economically feasible and gave women a measure of economic independence. Norwegian emigration and international trade spread the symbol across the world, where it is often interpreted as a snowflake or a star instead of a flower. This helped cement the association between the selburose and winter clothing and therefore winter itself.

== See also ==
- Kannuksenpyörä for octagonal star and cross patterns in Scandinavian cultures more generally
