= Icelandic sheep =

Icelandic breed of sheep

Icelandic
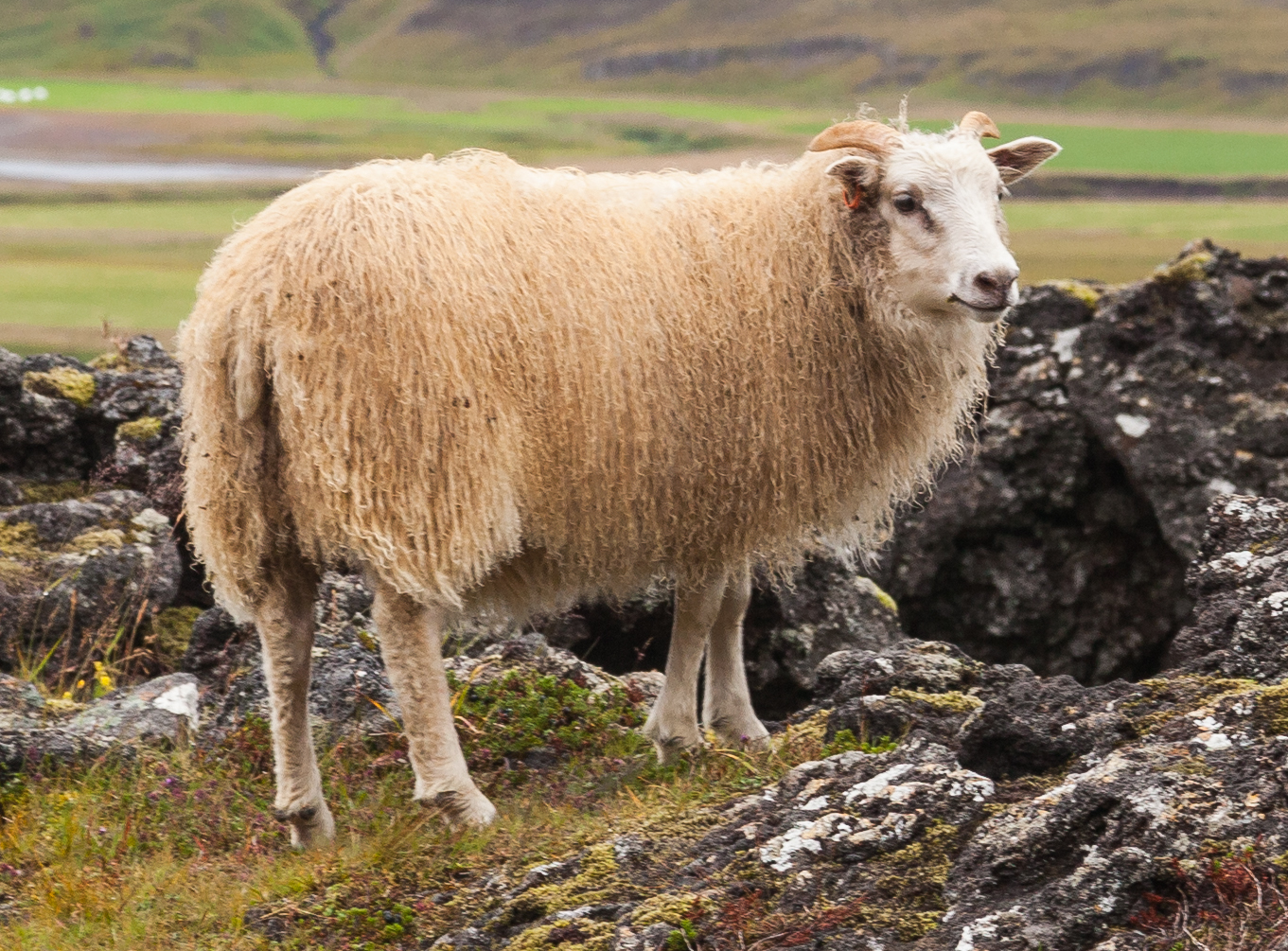
- On Grábrók, in Vesturland
- Conservation status: FAO (2007): not at risk; DAD-IS (2025): not at risk; Leadersheep: endangered maintained
- Country of origin: Iceland
- Use: meat; wool; formerly milk

Traits
- Weight: Male: 91 to 100 kg (201 to 220 lb); Female: 68 to 73 kg (150 to 161 lb)
- Wool color: variable
- Horn status: usually horned; polled and polycerate animals occur

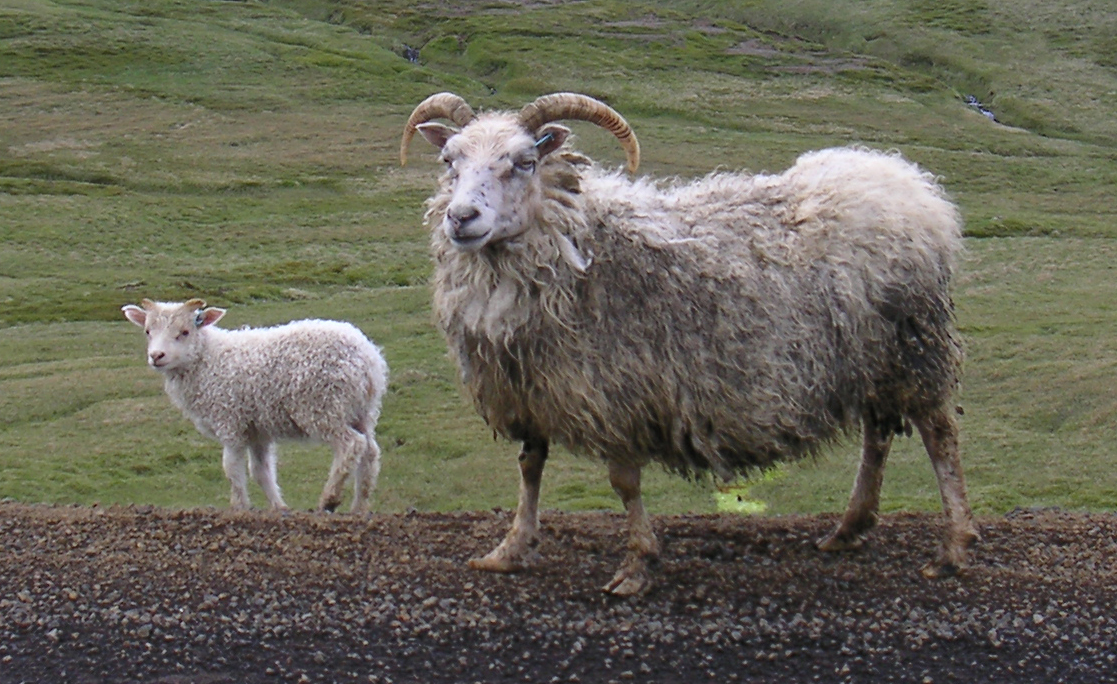
Ewe with lamb

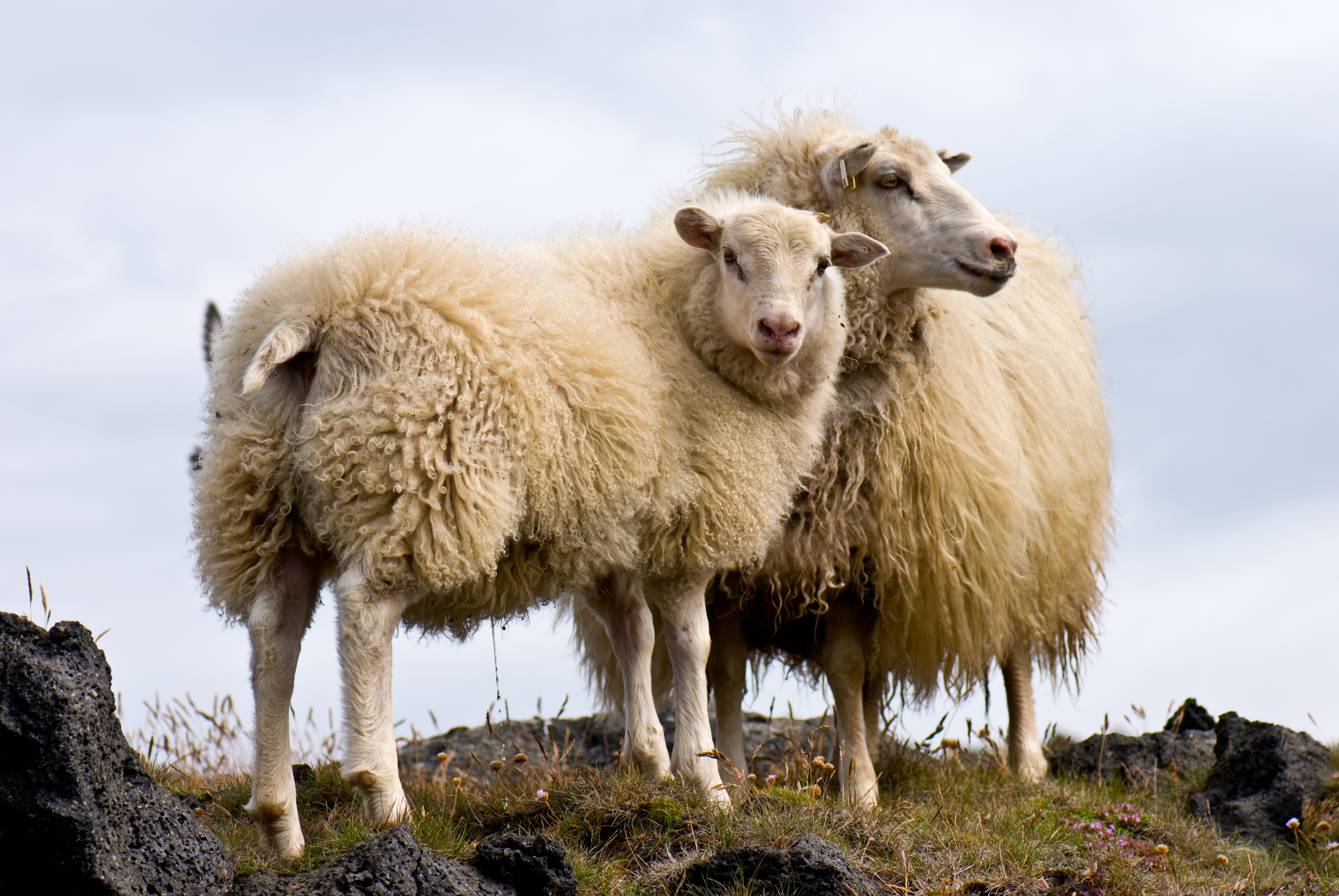
A pair of Icelandic sheep

The Icelandic sheep (Note: Icelandic: íslenska sauðkindin, pronounced [ˈistlɛnska ˈsœyðˌcʰɪntɪn]) is the Icelandic breed of domestic sheep. It belongs to the Northern European Short-tailed group and is one of the larger breeds in that group. Sheep of this type were brought to Iceland by settlers in the late ninth and early tenth centuries.

The breed is kept mainly for meat, with wool as a secondary product. Ewes were also milked in Iceland until the first half of the twentieth century.

== History ==
The Icelandic population descends largely from the sheep brought by Norse settlers. It is related to other northern short-tailed breeds, including the Faroese sheep and the Norwegian Spælsau. Attempts to cross it with imported sheep had little lasting genetic effect because the crossbred animals were later culled during disease-control campaigns.

The number of sheep peaked at about 891000 in 1978, equivalent to roughly four sheep for every resident of Iceland. It had fallen to about 450000 by 2007. The official totals were 432023 in 2018, 365290 in 2022, 354986 in 2023 and 345440 in 2024.

== Characteristics ==
Icelandic sheep are medium-sized, short-legged and broad-bodied, but relatively light-boned. The face, legs and udder are free of wool. Mature ewes weigh about 68 to 73 kg (150 to 161 lb) and rams about 91 to 100 kg (201 to 220 lb). Their double coat and seasonal wool growth provide protection in cold and wet conditions.

Both sexes may be horned or polled. Most horned animals have two horns, though four-horned animals occur, and a six-horned ram lamb has been documented. A polled line is known as the Kleifa strain. Historical descriptions indicate that polled sheep have been present in Iceland since at least the seventeenth century.

Four basic fleece colours are distinguished in Icelandic terminology: white, yellow or tan, black and moorit brown. Six principal patterns modify these colours, and Stefán Aðalsteinsson recorded 32 named forms of bicolour markings. Modern genetic descriptions place most of this variation at the agouti, brown and piebald-spotting loci. Each animal inherits one allele at each locus from each parent. Lamb fleeces may become lighter as the animal ages.

Icelandic ewes are prolific. A study of 9661 lambs found that 78.1% were twins, 13.7% triplets, 7.4% singletons and 0.8% quadruplets. Reported flock lambing percentages commonly range from 175% to 220%. Some ewes carry the prolificacy allele named Þoka, after an ewe born in 1950. A ewe at Hjarðarfell gave birth to five surviving lambs in 2002, and two sets of sextuplets were reported in eastern Iceland in 2026.

Ewe lambs may lamb at about twelve months of age, while ram lambs can become fertile at about seven months.

=== Leadersheep ===
The forystufé, or Leadersheep, was traditionally treated as a strain within the Icelandic population and was defined as a separate breed in Iceland in 2017. These sheep tend to move at the front of a flock and have long been selected for alertness and an ability to guide other animals in poor weather or over difficult ground. The behaviour is strongly inherited, although its precise genetic basis is not known. DAD-IS lists the Leadersheep as endangered but maintained.

== Icelandic terminology ==
The words fé, sauður and sauðfé are old Icelandic terms for sheep. Kind formerly meant a family or kind; its modern use for a sheep is thought to be shortened from sauðkind, literally a kind of sheep. Sauður has cognates in other Germanic languages.

An adult female is an ær and an adult male a hrútur. Lambs are lömb; a ram lamb may be called a hrútlamb or gimbill, and a ewe lamb a gimbur. A castrated male is a geldingur during its first winter and later a sauður. Sheep in their first winter are collectively gemlingar or gemsar.

Bottle-reared orphan lambs are commonly called heimalningar; variants include heimaalningar, heimalingar, heimagangar and pelalömb. An orphan lamb reared without bottle milk may be called a graslamb.

== Husbandry ==
The production year is strongly seasonal. Mating usually takes place in December and lambing in May. Ewes and lambs graze fields near the farm before moving to common mountain or highland pasture in late June. They are gathered in September, when the lambs are weaned. The gathering and sorting are known as smalamennska and réttir. At the sorting pens, ear marks or tags identify the owner of each animal; the flocks then return to their farms for winter housing. The event often involves farmers, relatives, local residents and visitors.

All sheep kept for breeding must be registered, and lambs receive identification tags. A lamb reported in 2024 swam about 200 to 300 m (660 to 980 ft) in the sea before reaching land; this was an individual incident rather than a breed trait.

=== Lambing management ===
Farmers monitor lambing closely because ewes may need assistance and newborn lambs must receive colostrum promptly. Clean individual pens help an ewe and her lambs form a bond. Farmers check the udder and teats, confirm that every lamb suckles and supplement lambs that receive too little milk.

An ewe has two main teats, so one lamb from a large litter may be fostered onto an ewe with a single lamb. In the twelve-year Hestur farm study, 5.5% of lambs were raised by foster mothers. Icelandic farm guidance describes several methods for introducing foster lambs and recommends recording the birth, sex, colour, assistance given and foster mother in the flock database. If no foster ewe is available, an orphan is fed milk replacer or surplus ewe's milk. The first ram and ewe lambs born on a farm each spring are traditionally called lambakóngur and lambadrottning. During the main lambing period, sheep may be watched around the clock.

== Diseases and biosecurity ==
Several epidemics followed separate imports of foreign sheep. Scrapie is thought to have reached Iceland with an imported British ram in 1878. A control programme began in 1978 and still includes surveillance, flock culling and restocking from unaffected areas. In 1933, twenty Karakul sheep imported from Germany introduced paratuberculosis, maedi-visna and jaagsiekte. Maedi-visna was eradicated by 1965, while paratuberculosis remains under control measures.

Other infections found in Icelandic flocks include caseous lymphadenitis, colibacillosis of newborn lambs and orf. Iceland is divided into disease-control compartments separated by fences or natural barriers. Movement across the boundaries generally requires permission. Since 2026, some sheep that cross a boundary by themselves may be returned when their genotype and the disease status of both compartments meet the official conditions.

Icelandic law imposes a general prohibition on importing live animals, although the authorities may grant permits under specified conditions. Live sheep have not normally been imported since the mid-twentieth century.

== Use ==
=== Meat ===
Meat provides more than 80% of the income from Icelandic sheep farming. Lambs are usually slaughtered in September or October at four to five months of age. A university breed description reports pasture-reared weights of about 36 to 41 kg (79 to 90 lb) at that age. A study of Icelandic production records found average growth from birth to weaning of about 236 grams per day for twin-reared lambs and 264 grams for single-reared lambs.

=== Wool ===
The fleece consists of a long outer coat, tog, and a fine inner coat, þel. Tog sheds rain and snow; þel traps insulating air close to the skin. Tog fibres are generally 28–40 μm in diameter and 150–200 mm long. Þel fibres are about 19–22 μm in diameter and 50–100 mm long. The coats may be separated: tog is suited to durable woven or worsted textiles, while þel is used for softer garments. Spinning them together produces the lightly twisted yarn known as lopi.

In the early twentieth century, raw wool in Iceland was graded mainly by sight and touch. At Kolkuós, a device called the ljósvog, or light balance, was tested around 1910. It combined the force needed to pull a fibre sample with the amount of light that passed through it; the two readings were used to estimate wool fineness. The device is not known to have been used beyond Kolkuós. In 1912, it was replaced there by fixed reference samples used for grading.

Most wool is obtained in the autumn, a few weeks before mating. A second shearing in March, known as taking the snoð, is mainly a clean-up; wool from sheep shorn only once over winter is called vetrarull. Wool is difficult to ignite, tends to self-extinguish and chars rather than melting or dripping.

=== Milk ===
Ewes were Iceland's main dairy animals for centuries, but regular sheep milking declined rapidly in the early twentieth century and had largely ceased by the 1940s. Historical accounts describe separating lambs from their mothers at night from about two weeks of age and milking the ewes for several weeks. Most ewes were reported to give about one litre per day, with peak yields of up to three litres. The milk was consumed directly or made into butter, cheese and skyr. Surplus colostrum was used for the set custard called ábrystir.

== Environmental effects ==
At settlement, birch forest and woodland covered an estimated 25% to 40% of Iceland. The total forest and woodland cover is now close to 2%. Clearing, fuel use, grazing, climate and volcanic disturbances all contributed to the change. Grazing by sheep and horses can slow vegetation recovery and intensify erosion on sensitive land, but the effects vary with stocking pressure and local conditions. Erosion has also changed the distribution and quantity of organic carbon in Icelandic soils.
