= Selbuvott =

Norwegian knitted mittens

A display of selbu mittens

Selbuvott (transl. selbu mitten) is a knitted woolen mitten, based on a pattern from Selbu Municipality in Norway. Like all mittens, the purpose of selbuvott is to keep hands warm during winter, with one large space for fingers and a separate smaller section for the thumb. The pattern is a Selburose, which is a traditional rose from the Selbu area, shaped like an octagram. Marit Guldsetbrua Emstad first knitted the pattern into a pair of mittens in 1857, and sold mittens through Husfliden in Trondheim in 1897. Selbuvott is possibly the most-worn knitted pattern in Norway.

== Marriage tradition ==
Although traditionally only worked with two colors, patterns for these mittens could often be very intricate. Because of this, Selbuvott was used as a form of a dowry for young girls since selbuvott required an intense amount of time, care, and skilled practice in order to perfect the technique and get the desired look. A girl would start knitting these mittens from a very young age so that she could present them to her future husband and wedding guests.

== See also ==
- Selburose
