= Sheila McGregor =

Scottish fibre artist and historian

- Occupations: Writer, fibre artist, historian
- Notable work: The Complete Book of Traditional Scandinavian Knitting, The Complete Book of Traditional Fair Isle Knitting

Sheila McGregor is a Scottish fibre artist, author, and historian who published The Complete Book of Traditional Scandinavian Knitting and The Complete Book of Traditional Fair Isle Knitting. She has also worked on a series called Culture and Language of which seven volumes have been published from 2017 to 2022.

== Career ==
McGregor started working on The Complete Book of Traditional Fair Isle Knitting in the mid-1970s, motivated by her concern over changes to Scottish traditions caused by the oil industry. She travelled to the Shetland Isles and other remote places in Scotland to visit knitters, and studied pieces of historic knitting in private collections and museums across Shetland, elsewhere in Scotland, and in London. In her book, she attempts to debunk many of the romantic stories surrounding the traditions of Shetland knitting, seeking to provide a more accurate history.

She became interested in Scandinavian knitting in 1955 after discovering a jersey in a Copenhagen shop. Despite being a poor student and unable to purchase it, she bought a knitting pattern and recreated the style herself. For her book The Complete Book of Traditional Scandinavian Knitting, she journeyed to Scandinavia, engaging with local knitters and examining traditional knitted items in various museums and collections. In this book, she illustrates how the Scandinavian tradition is connected to the Shetland Tradition.

The Scotsman said in 1983 that Traditional Knitting "discards many of the myths surrounding this craft ... [and] gives a stimulating insight into the key influences in folk knitting around the world".

In 2014, McGregor donated some of her research to the Shetland Museum. The collection is open to researchers by appointment.

From 2010 onwards, McGregor started to work on pre-historical language, culture, especially in relation to Scotland. Challenging the Indo-European theory of language, she proposes an alternative based on cognate words with interchangeable sounds, since palaeolithic time. Seven books have been published in the series. First Settler Theory rejects language replacement theories that posit invasion, ethnic cleansing, or other mechanisms proposed by Indo-European linguistic archaeology. Flying by Night is a meticulous uncovering of the mistranslation from Gaelic into English, during the witch trials in Scotland. It is based on archival research of trial records.She also published a volume of poetry in 2023.

== Personal life ==
McGregor lives in Edinburgh and was Chairman of Council at the Clan Gregor Society.

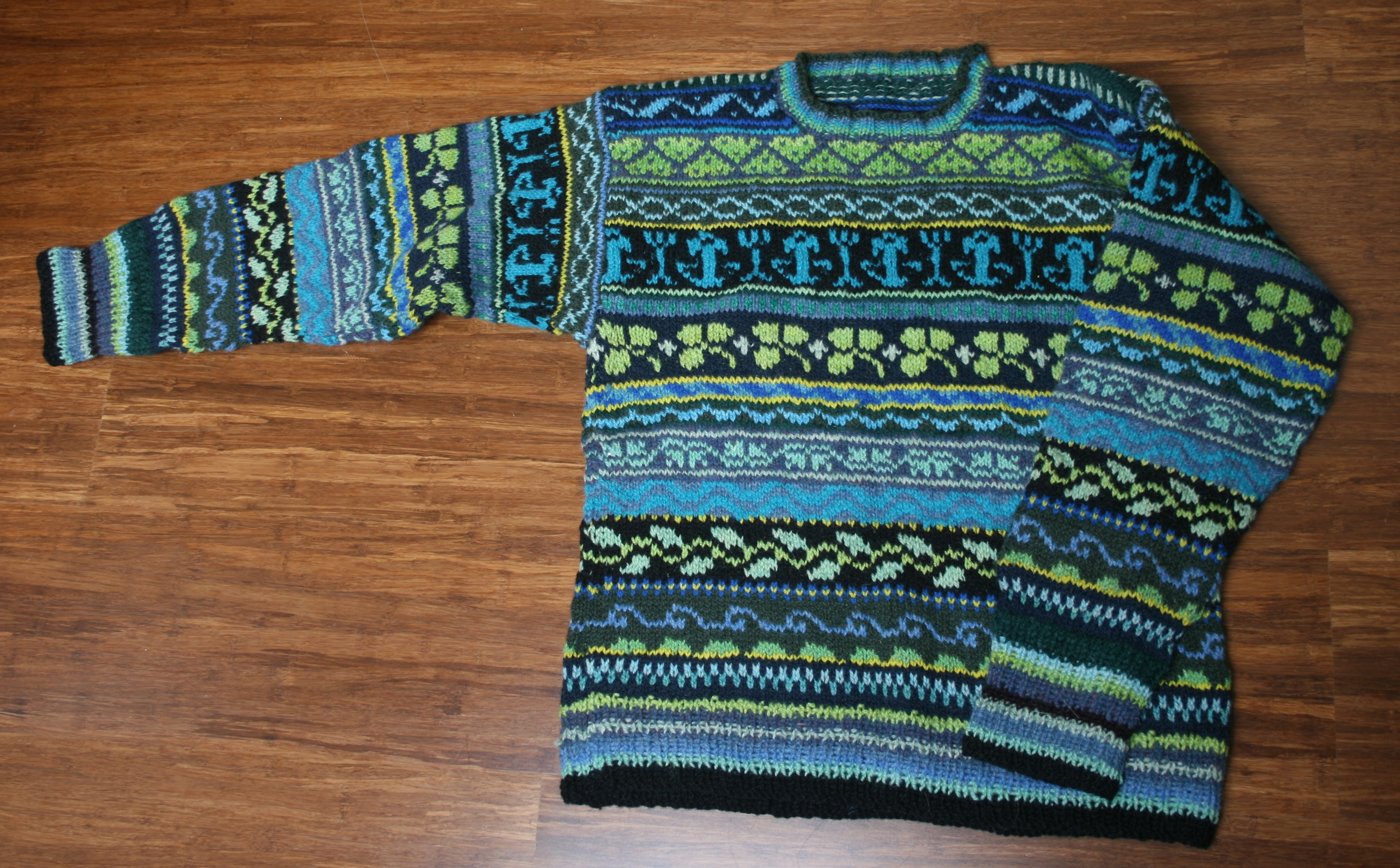
A Fair Isle pullover

== Published works ==
- McGregor, Sheila (1981). The Complete Book of Traditional Fair Isle Knitting London: Batsford. ISBN 978-0713414325
- McGregor, Sheila (1984). The Complete Book of Traditional Scandinavian Knitting London: Batsford. ISBN 978-0312156381
- McGregor, Sheila (2003). Traditional Fair Isle Knitting (revised edition of former publication) 978-1985632332 Dover Publications Inc ISBN 978-0486431079
- McGregor, Sheila (2004). Traditional Scandinavian Knitting (revised edition of former publication) Dover Publications Inc ISBN 978-0486433004
- McGregor, Sheila (2017) Wordlists, Kindle Amazon books. ISBN 978-1539073451
- McGregor, Sheila (2018) Bones and Bonfires: Cremation Rituals at the Annats of Scotland, Kindle Amazon books.ISBN 978-1985632332
- McGregor, Sheila (2018) Possibly Paleolithic: Prehistoric Survival in Highland Scotland, Kindle Amazon books. ISBN 978-1985651289
- McGregor, Sheila (2018) First Settler Theory: and the Origin of European Languages, Kindle Amazon books.ISBN 978-1986514392
- McGregor, Sheila (2019) Archaic Gaelic: Decoding a Lost Language, Kindle Amazon books.ISBN 978-1729023563
- McGregor, Sheila (2020) Flying by Night: Scottish Witches and Fairies, Kindle Amazon books.
- McGregor, Sheila (2021) Fire!: How Language Began, Kindle Amazon books. ISBN 979-8703396889
- McGregor, Sheila (2023) Night Roads. Exile at Home, Kindle Amazon books ISBN 979-8391515791

== See also ==
- Fair Isle (technique)
- Alice Starmore
- Elizabeth Zimmerman
- Jane Gaugain
- Bill Gibb
- Emma Jacobsson
- Auður Laxness
- Mary Walker Phillips
- Meg Swansen
- Barbara G. Walker
