= National Museum of Iceland =

Museum in Reykjavík, Iceland

Coordinates: 64°08′31″N 21°56′53″W

- Þjóðminjasafn Íslands

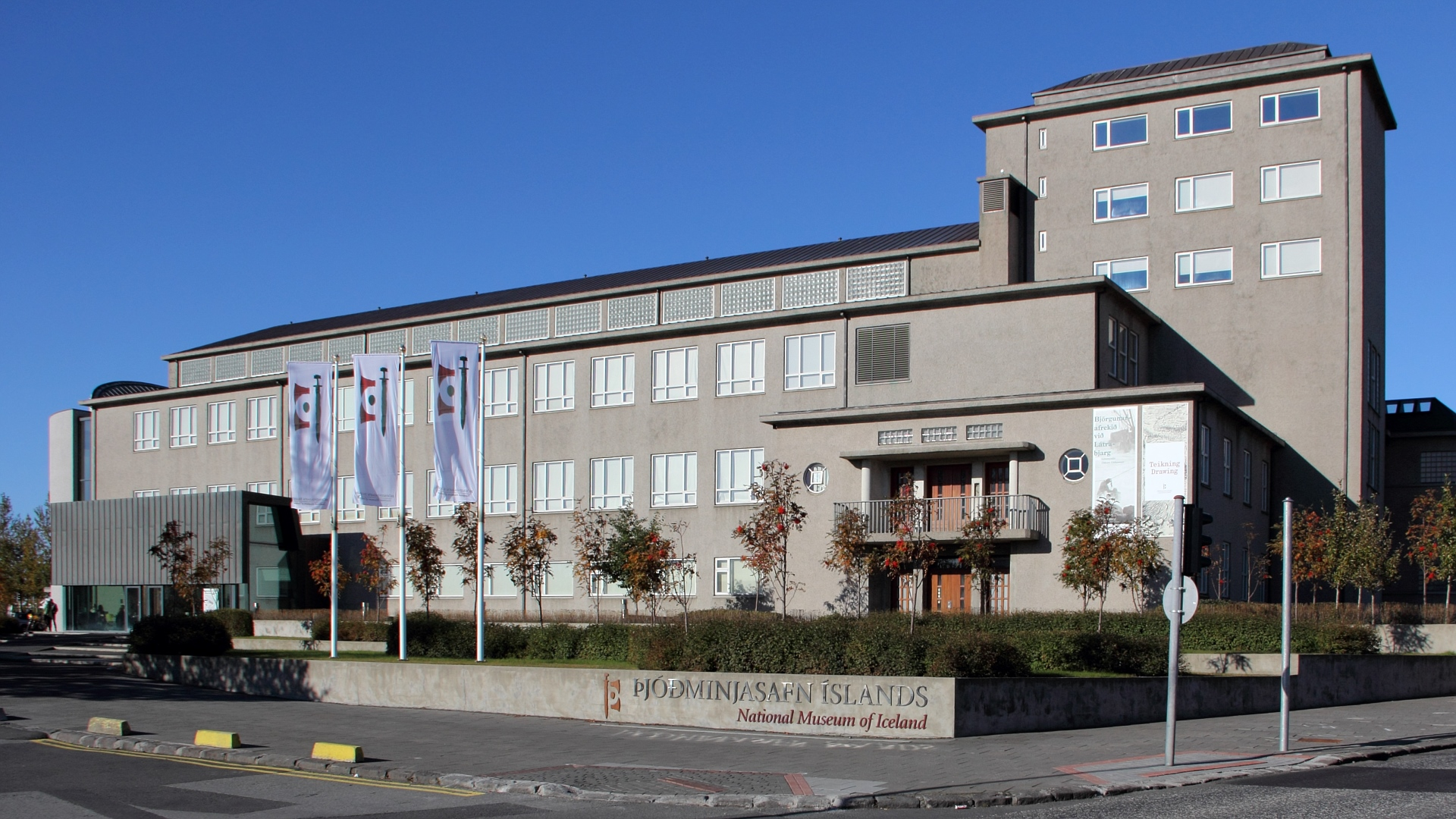
- Suðurgata 41, Reykjavík
- Established: 24 February 1863
- Location: Reykjavík, Iceland
- Website: www.thjodminjasafn.is

The National Museum of Iceland (Icelandic: Þjóðminjasafn Íslands, [ˈθjouðˌmɪnjaˌsapn ˈistlan(t)s]) is a museum in Reykjavík, Iceland. It was established on 24 February 1863, with Jón Árnason the first curator of the Icelandic collection, previously kept in Danish museums.

== Collections ==
The second curator, Sigurður Guðmundsson, advocated the creation of an antiquarian collection. The museum was called the Antiquarian Collection until 1911 when its name changed to the National Museum of Iceland. Before settling at its present location, at Suðurgata 41, 101 Reykjavík, in 1950, it was housed in various Reykjavík attics, including in the attic of the Culture House for 40 years.

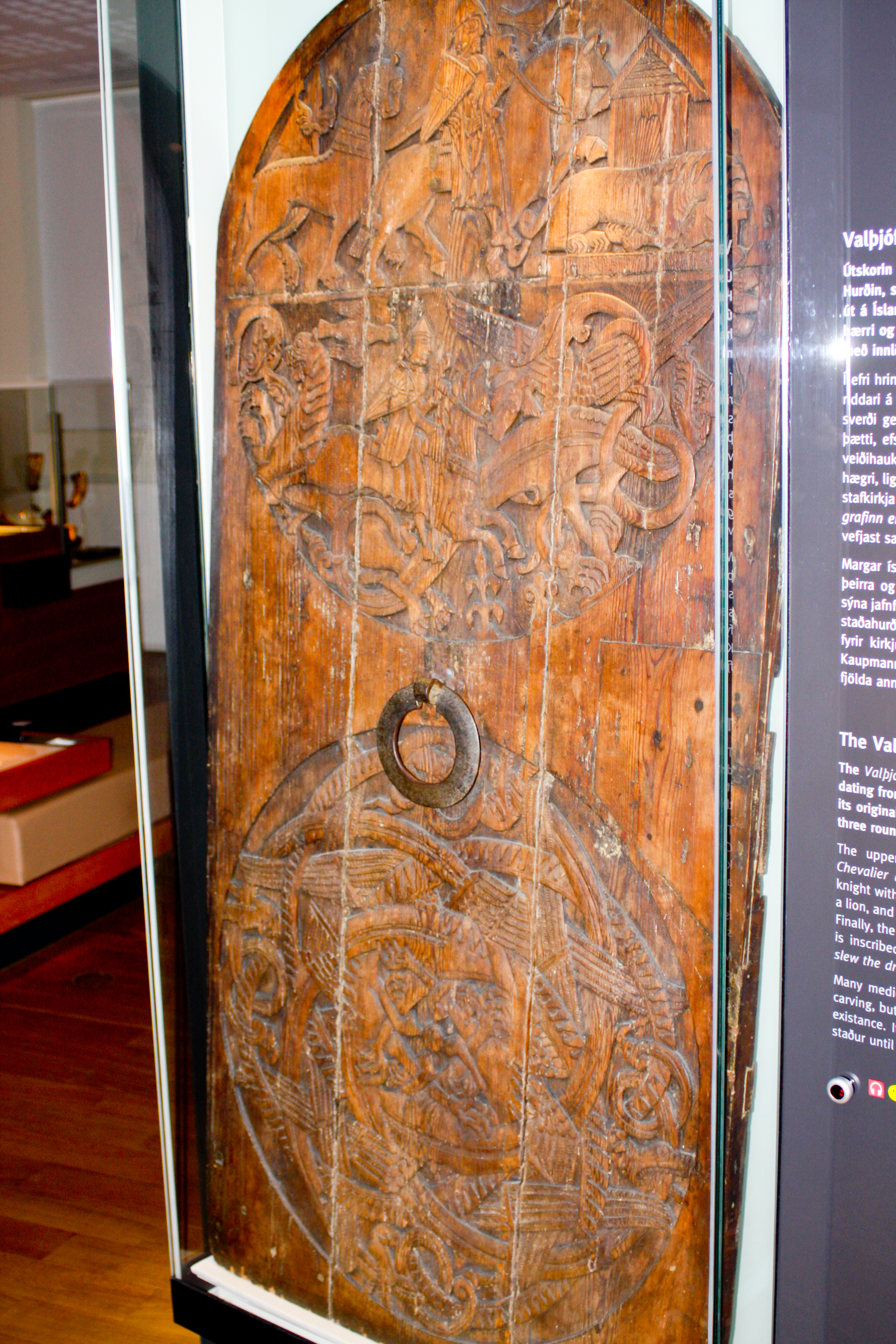
The Valþjófsstaður door on exhibit

The museum's permanent exhibit is about Icelandic history and includes about 2,000 objects. A key object in the permanent exhibition is the Valþjófsstaður door, a celebrated carving depicting a version of the Lion-Knight legend where a knight slays a dragon, thus freeing a lion that becomes his companion.

Þór (Thor), the god of thunder, depicted holding his hammer Mjölnir. One of the most renowned artifacts in The National Museum of Iceland.

== See also ==
- Höfðaletur - related to carvings at the Museum
