= Icelandic national costume =

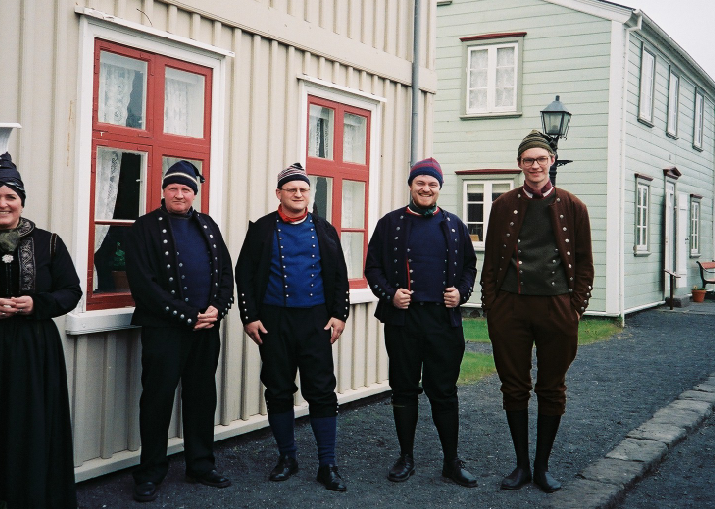
Icelandic men wearing 18th-century-style national costumes.

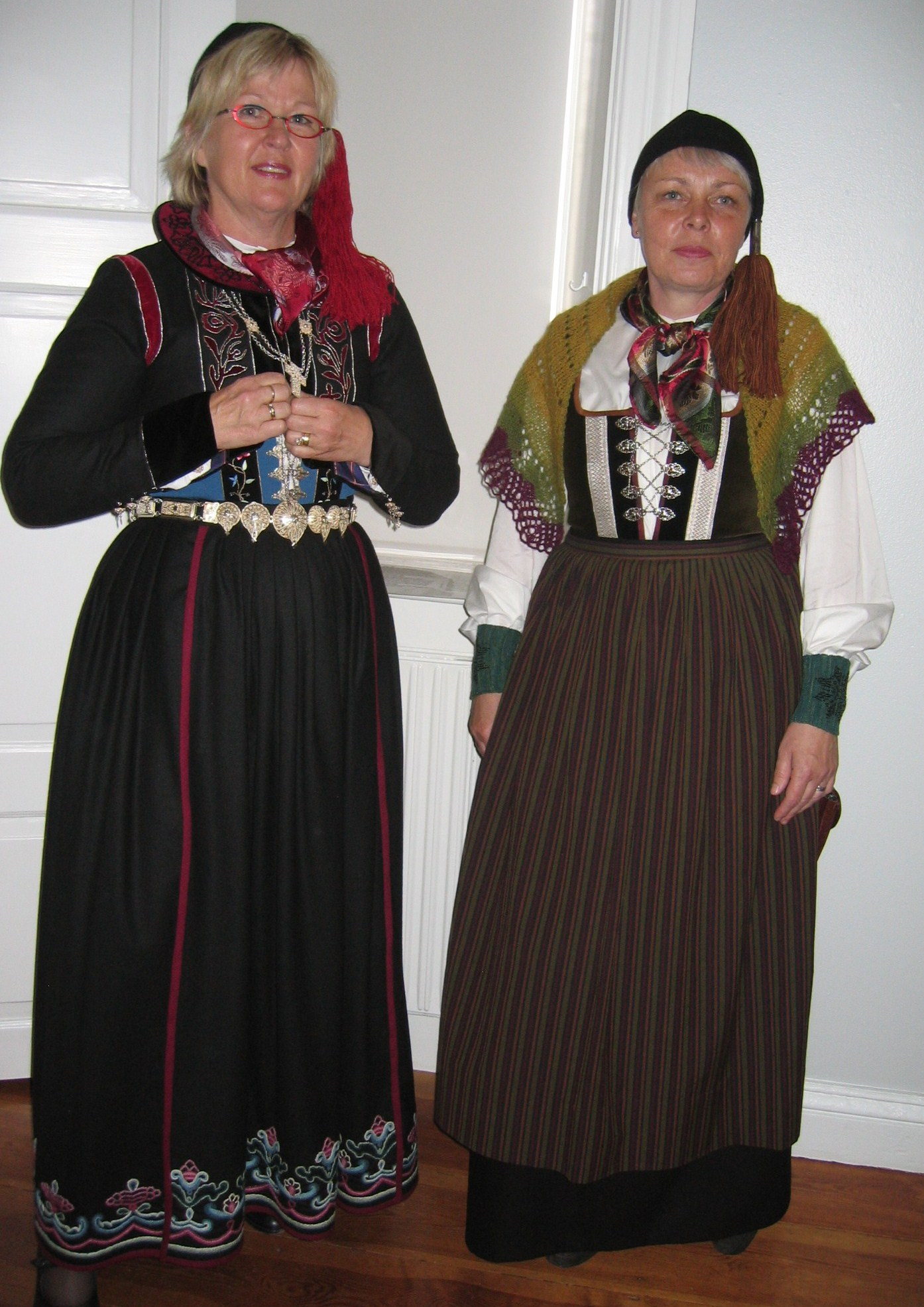
Icelandic women in the 18th century faldbúningur with tail-caps. The one to the right omits the jacket and is thus wearing a upphlutur.

Icelandic national costume, collectively known in Icelandic as Þjóðbúningurinn has enjoyed various levels of popularity since the term was coined in Iceland in the 19th century, during the struggle for independence. Since 2001 the national costume is regulated by Þjóðbúningaráð (The National Costume Authority), which preserves the correct techniques of making them and instructs people.

== Women's costume ==
The five following types of costume are all recognized as Icelandic National costumes. However both the kyrtill and skautbúningur were designed in the 19th century from scratch as ceremonial costumes, while the faldbúningur, peysuföt and the upphlutur are traditional daily wear of Icelandic women in olden times.

=== Faldbúningur ===
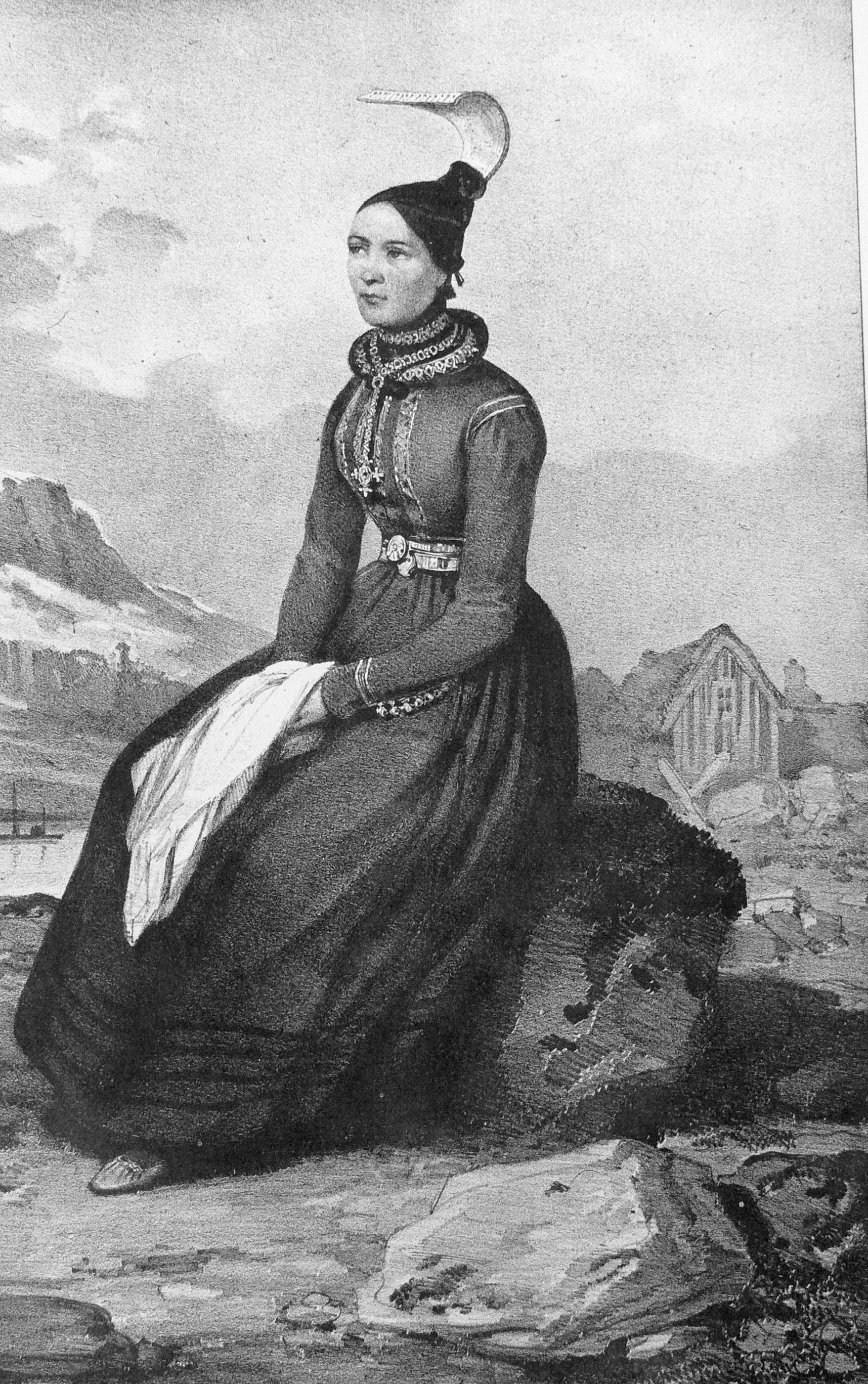
Icelandic woman in the 18th century faldbúningur with the spaðafaldur cap.

The Faldbúningur is an older type of costume worn by women since at least the 17th century and well into the 19th. In its most recognized form it incorporated a hat decorated with a curved sheet-like ornament protruding into the air and exists in two variants. One of which is the krókfaldur and the other is the spaðafaldur. Previously a large hat decorated with gold-wire bands was worn with it, as well as ruff which is the reason for the faldbúningur's wide collar, which was designed to support it. Later, around the start of the 18th century women started to wear the much simpler tail-cap with it.

=== Peysuföt ===
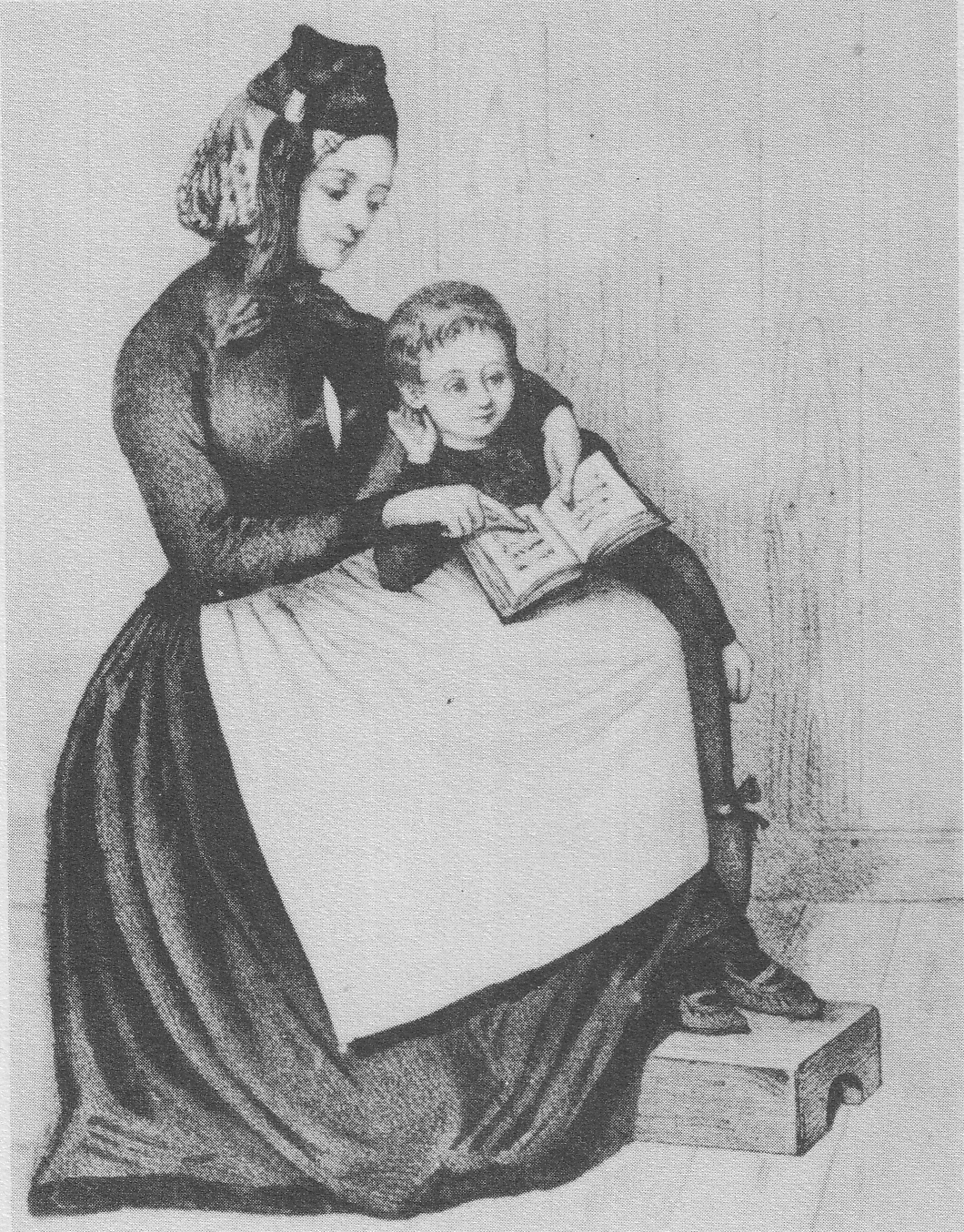
Icelandic woman wearing peysuföt teaches a boy to read.

The Peysuföt are black woollen clothes commonly worn by women in the 18-19th century. They usually consisted of a twill skirt and a jacket of fine knitted woollen yarn with a black tail cap. It is believed that this costume was invented when women, desiring simpler working clothes than the faldbúningur, started to use male articles of clothing. This includes both the tail-cap and the peysa which originally was a jacket with a single row of buttons, but evolved into this costume and eventually discarded with the buttons.

=== Upphlutur ===
The Upphlutur is a woman's costume, consisting of bodice that can be coloured in bright colours such as red or blue, but often black. Its headpiece is a tail cap. The costume is basically the undergarment of the faldbúningur which evolved into a costume of its own right.

=== Kyrtill ===
The Kyrtill is a costume for women, designed by the artist Sigurður Guðmundsson in the 19th century. It was designed to look like Viking Age costumes. It however incorporates a hat similar to the one on the skautbúningur. While Sigurður's vision of the Viking Age costume remains popular, costumes designed to more closely resemble archaeological finds have gained some popularity as well.

=== Skautbúningur ===
The Skautbúningur was also designed by Sigurður Guðmundsson. It was conceived as a modernized variation of the faldbúningur, which had fallen out of use by the middle of the 19th century. It incorporates a complicated hat inspired by the ones traditionally used with the faldbúningur.

== Men's costume ==
Búningur karla or the Men's costume exists in three or four radically different versions. The þjóðbúningur karla is the only direct descendant of traditional daily wear of Icelandic men, while the other were designed from the start as ceremonial costume.

=== Þjóðbúningur ===
The one considered most traditional consists of woolen breeches or trousers, a usually double buttoned vest and a double buttoned jacket called treyja. Sometimes a peysa with a single row of buttons is used in lieu of the vest and treyja. On the head is a tail cap, though historically different hats were also used. This costume was usually black, navy blue or dark green, although the vest, which was usually brighter was sometimes red, some regions stood out, using white wool instead of the darker colors. It is identical to the clothing Icelandic men commonly wore from the 17th until the 19th century.

=== Fornmannaklæði ===
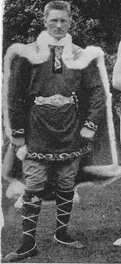
The wrestler Jóhann Jósefsson wearing the fornmannaklæði in 1908.

In the middle of the 19th century, when many Icelandic men had taken to using continental clothing, Sigurður Guðmundsson, an Icelandic artist, designed a costume for men which closely resembles 10th century Nordic clothing. While it attained some popularity at the time, it eventually disappeared until at the end of the 20th century when Viking culture and traditions have enjoyed increased popularity.

=== Hátíðarbúningur ===
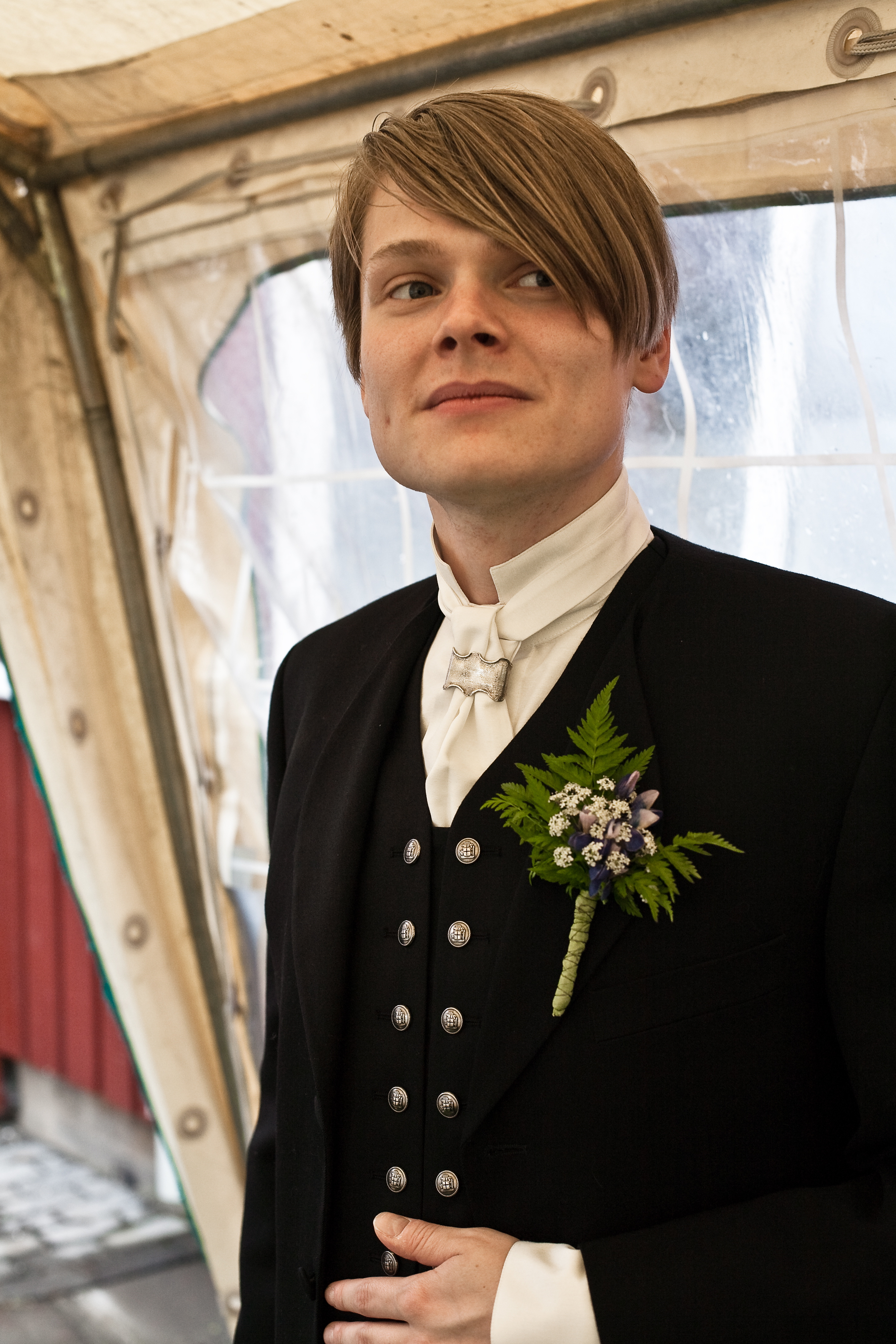
An Icelandic man wears the hátíðarbúningur formal costume on his wedding day along with a boutonnière.

Although not a traditional costume, the hátíðarbúningur was conceived as a modernized version of the men's traditional national costume and is frequently worn instead of a tuxedo to formal events. It is the result of a competition for an updated (i.e., more pragmatic) version of the men's national costume held in 1994 in correlation with the 50th anniversary of Iceland's independence from Denmark and the establishment of the republic. Some have critiqued the design of the hátíðarbúningur, claiming that it bears greater resemblance to the Faroese national costume in its styling. Regardless, the hátíðarbúningur continues to enjoy widespread popularity among Icelanders.

=== The fourth costume ===
Sigurður Guðmundsson also designed another costume in the middle of the 19th century, which was commonly worn by students. It consisted of a black jacket, white shirt and black knee-breeches with horizontally striped or solid colored white socks.

== Children's costumes ==
The búningur barna or the children's costumes did not differ from the adult's version (except in size) until the 20th century, when girls were given shorter skirts.

== Shoes ==
Although today, modern shoes are often used with the National Costumes, traditionally shoes made of either fish or sheep-skin, with woollen inlets, were worn with the costumes. These shoes are known as roðskór and sauðskinsskór respectively. Some people also use 18th or 19th century type leather shoes with buckles similar to the footwear commonly used with the Faroese and Norwegian National Costumes.

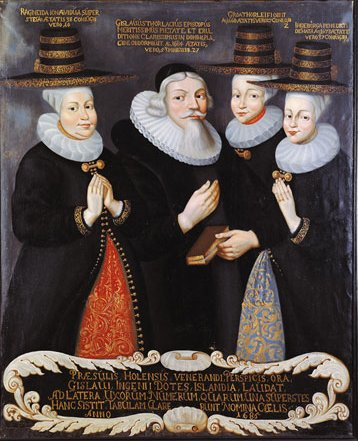
Icelandic 17th century ecclesiastical/noble costume. The women wear a proto-faldbúningur, with gold-banded hats and ruff, this is however not the oldest type.

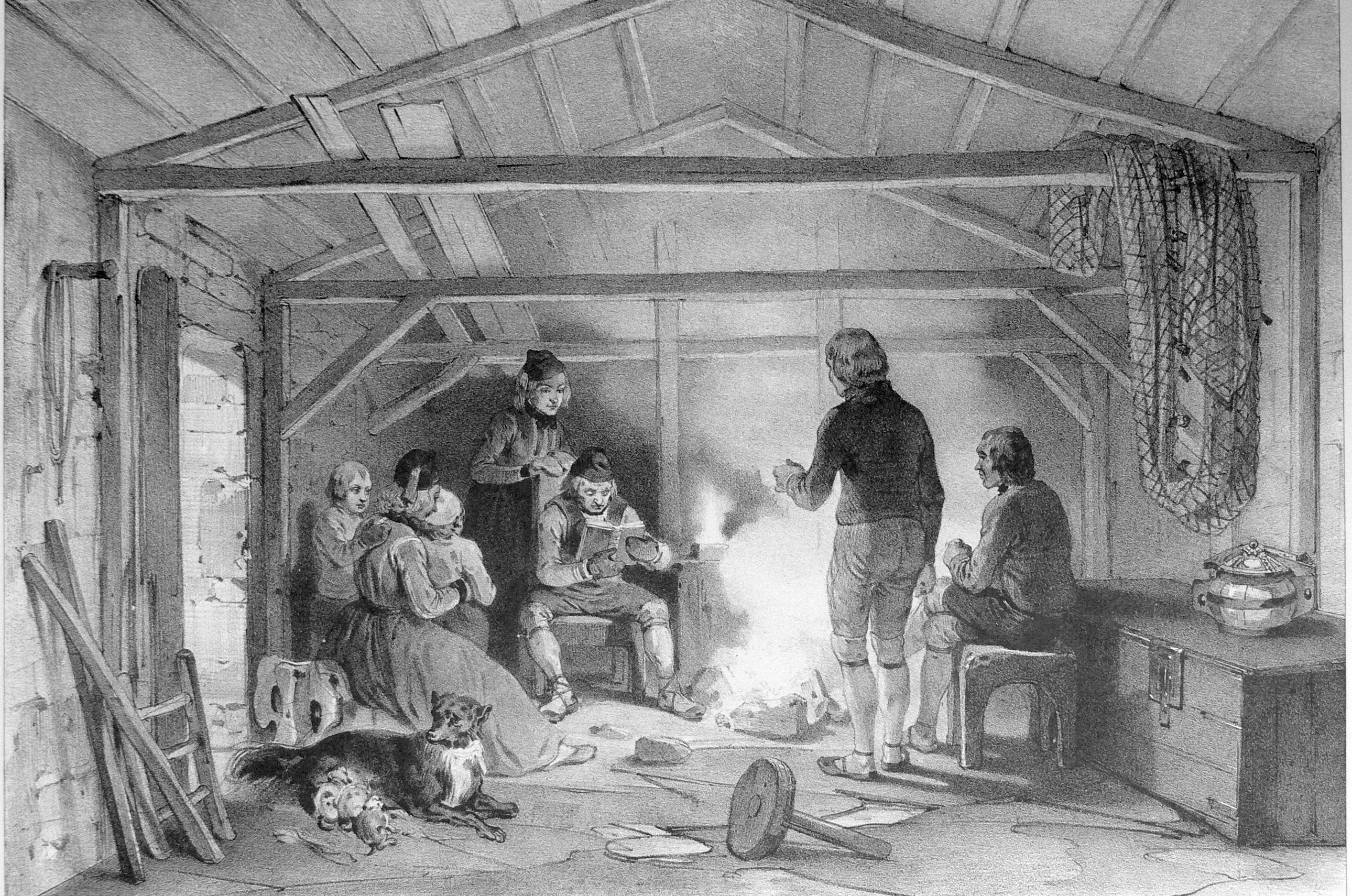
People inside a house in early 19th century costume. The women wear the faldbúningur with tail-caps, while the men are wearing pantaloons instead of breeches or trousers.

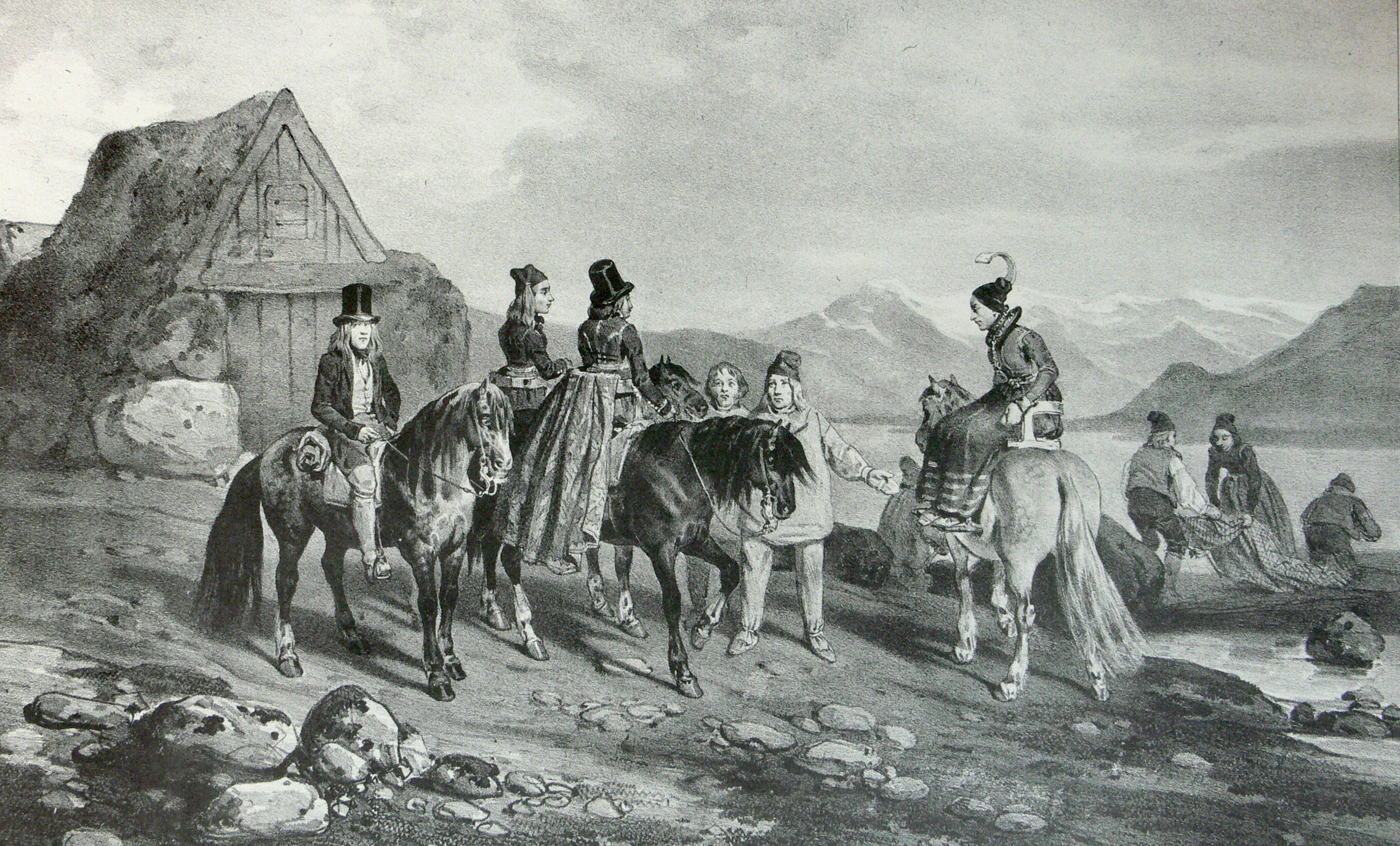
People going to church. The women wear the faldbúningur with various headpieces. The man to the left is wearing pantaloons while a man to the right is wearing breeches.

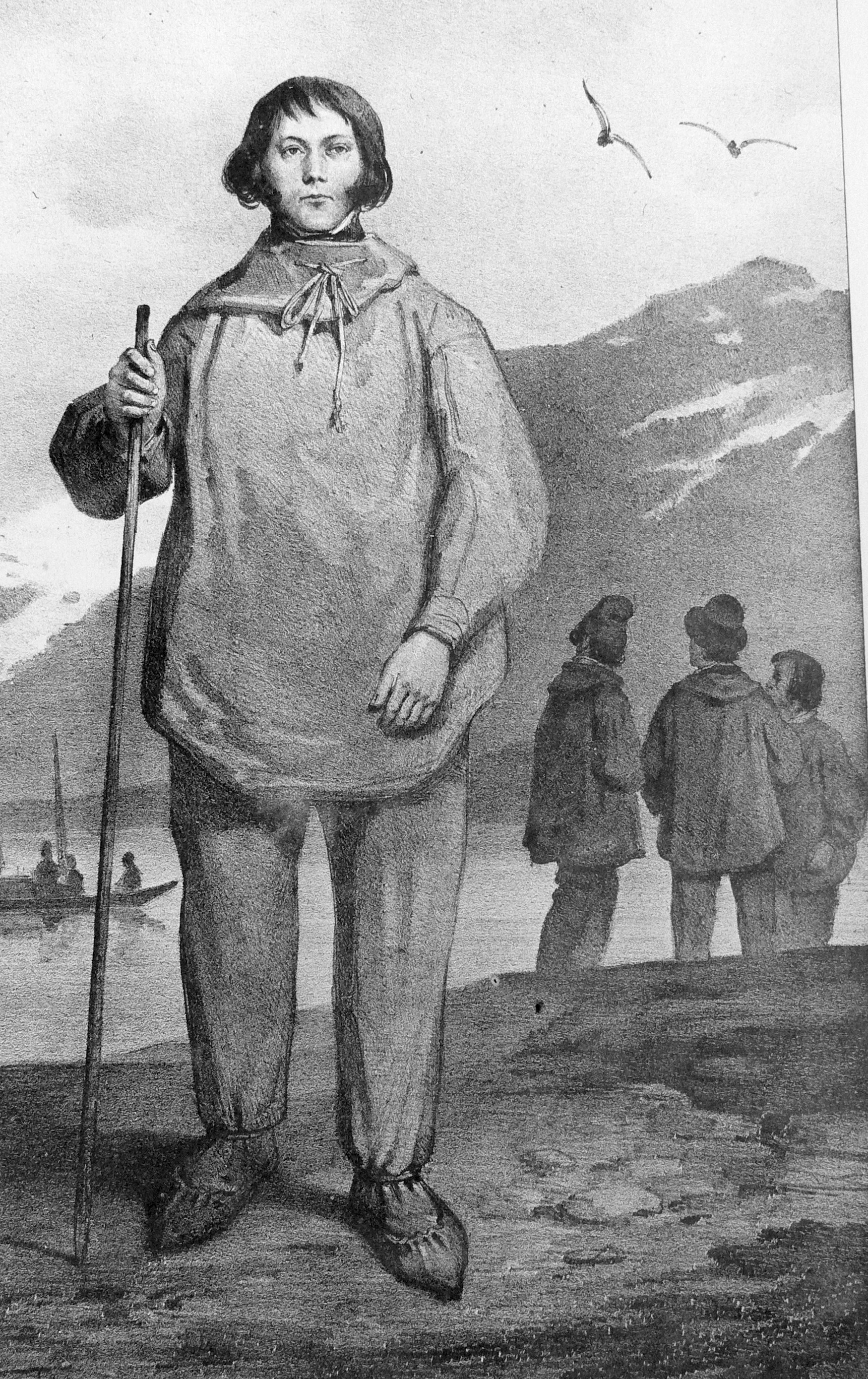
Traditional clothing of seamen worn over land-clothes. It is made of sewn leather and further insulated with fish-liver oil.

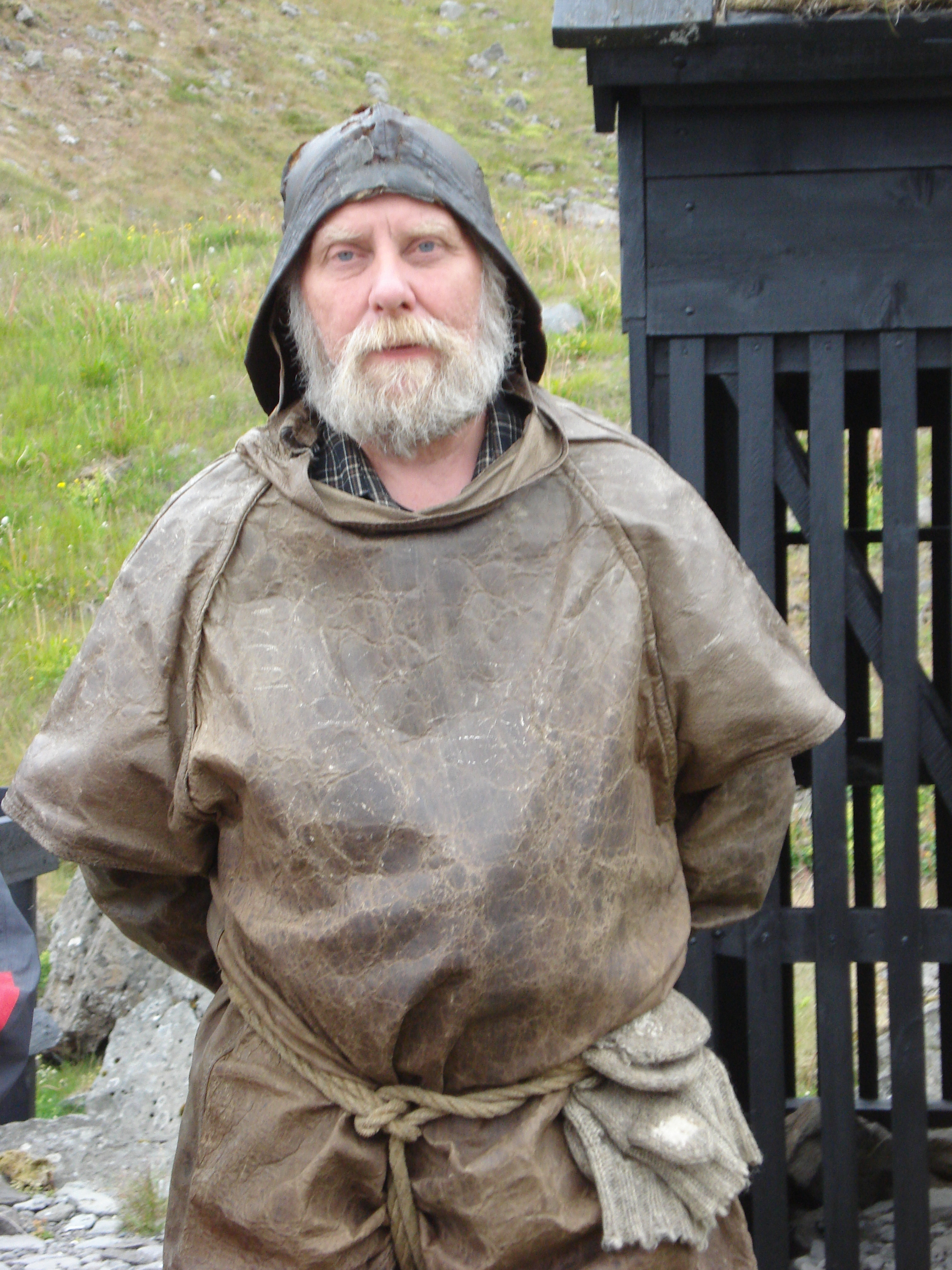
Man wearing sea clothing. The type of shirt pattern he is wearing underneath became popular in the 19th century.

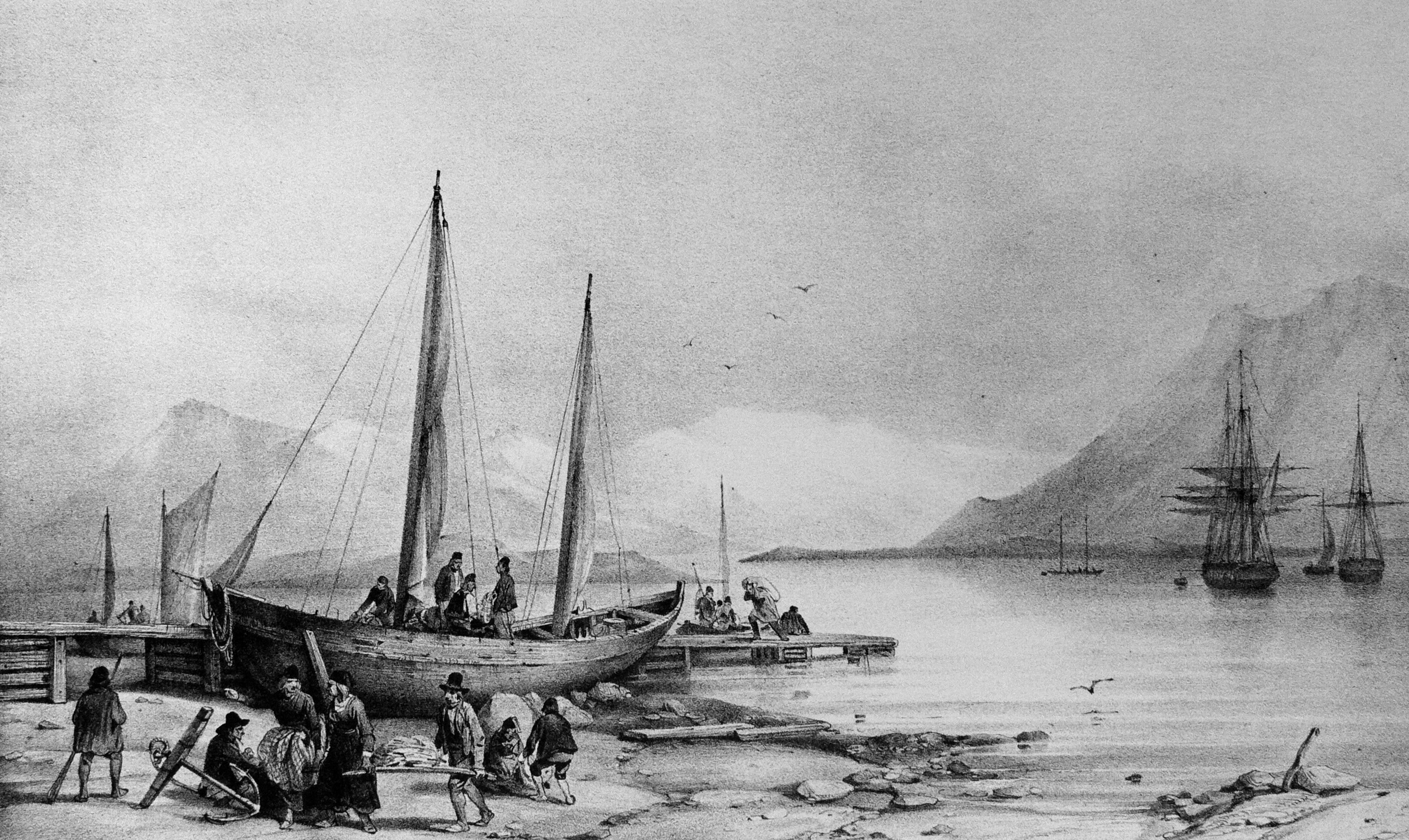
People at the harbour in early 19th century costume.

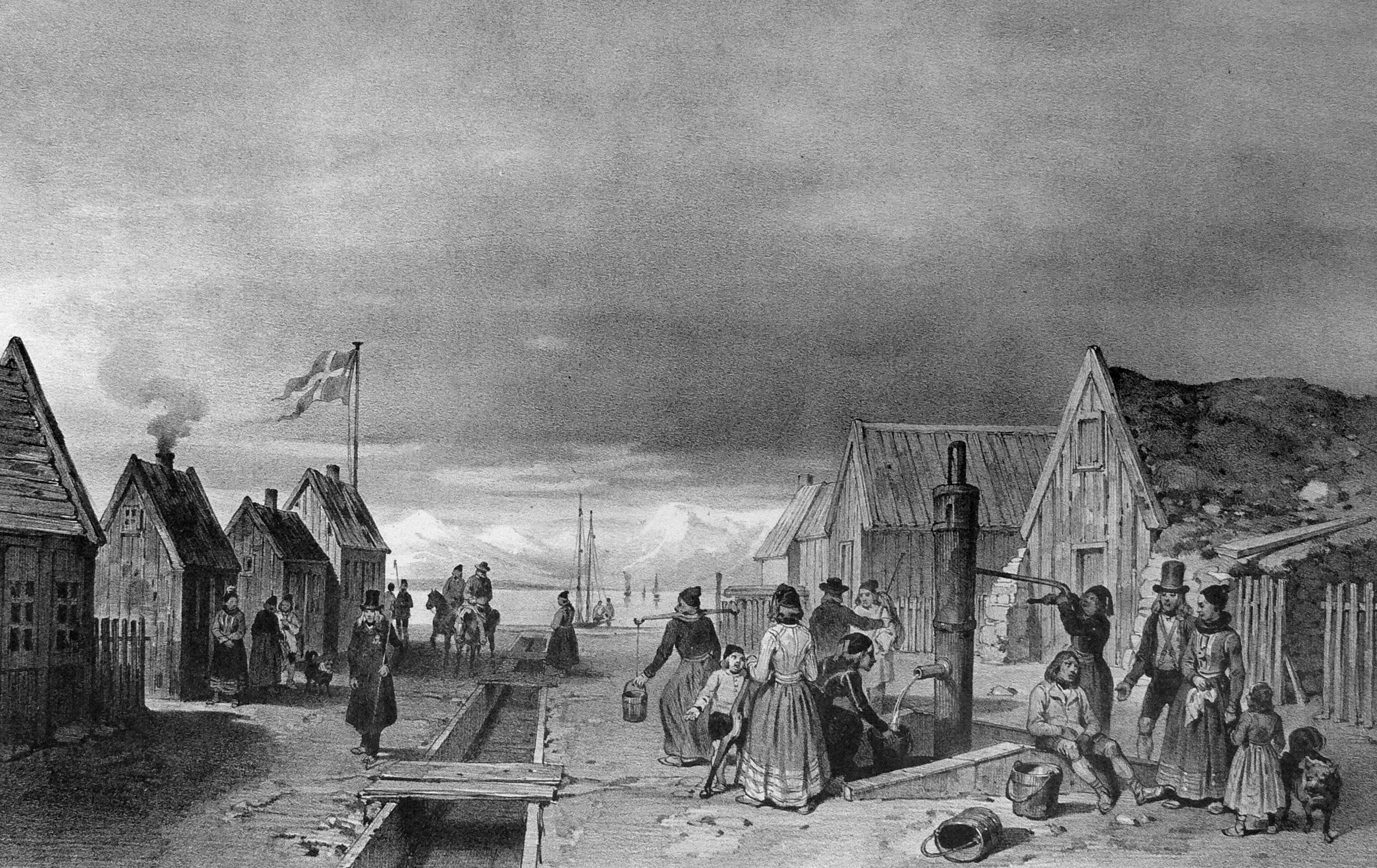
Early 19th century people in Reykjavík. The man on the right is wearing his suspenders in an unusual manner on top of his vest. The night-watch to the left is wearing European costume, albeit with traditional Icelandic shoes made of sheep-leather.

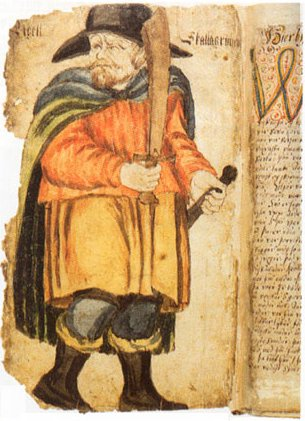
A picture from a 17th-century manuscript depicting Egill Skallagrímsson. On this picture he is wearing 16-17th century costume and carrying a Falchion.

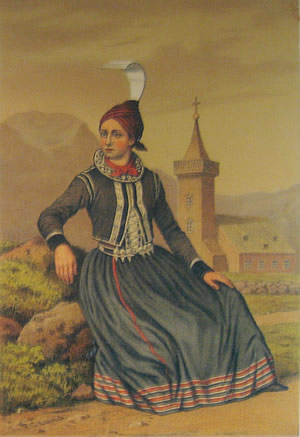
A woman wearing the faldbúningur with a spaðafaldur cap.

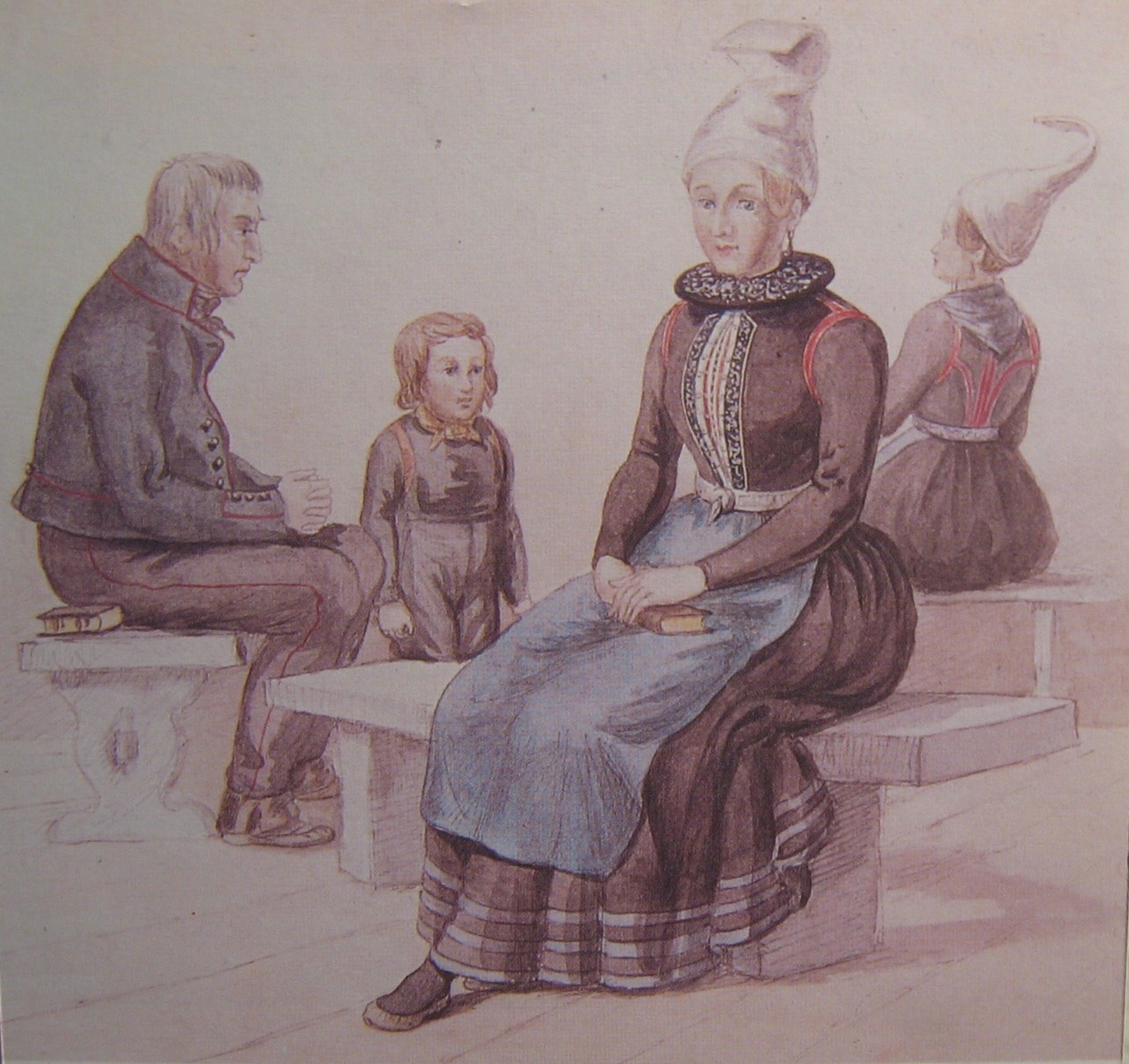
Women in faldbúningur with the spaðafaldur cap. The man is wearing a treyja of a later type with a collar and trousers.

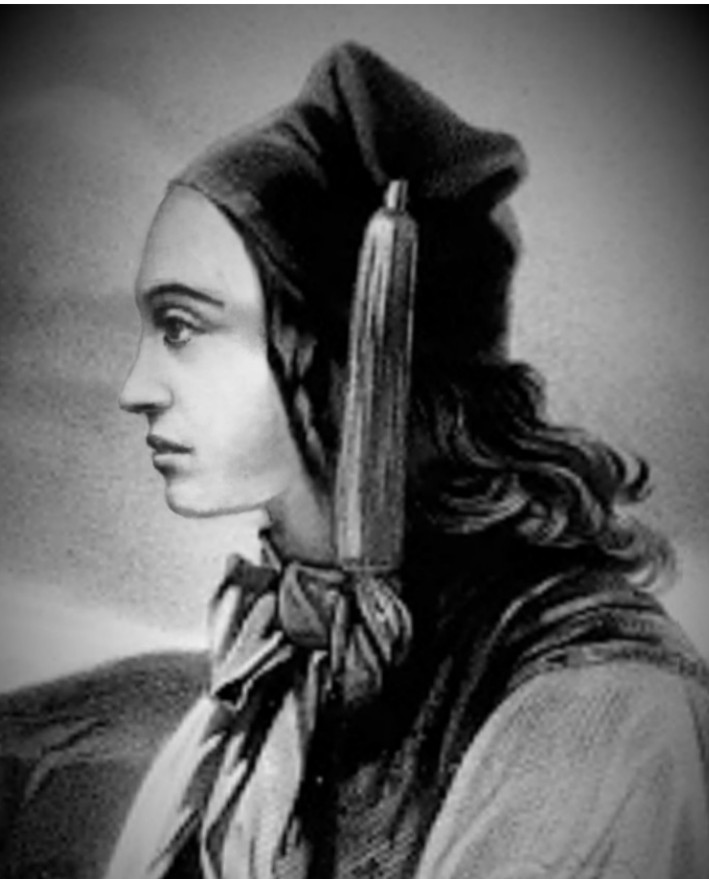
The skotthúfa tail-cap.

== Usage ==
In olden times these clothes, except the skautbúningur, kyrtill and hátíðarbúningur, were worn daily by people of all ages and classes. Today they are worn by many on ceremonial occasions such as the National day, birthdays and weddings.

== See also ==
- Lopapeysa
- Bunad
