= Valþjófsstaður door =

12th-century carved church door in the National Museum of Iceland

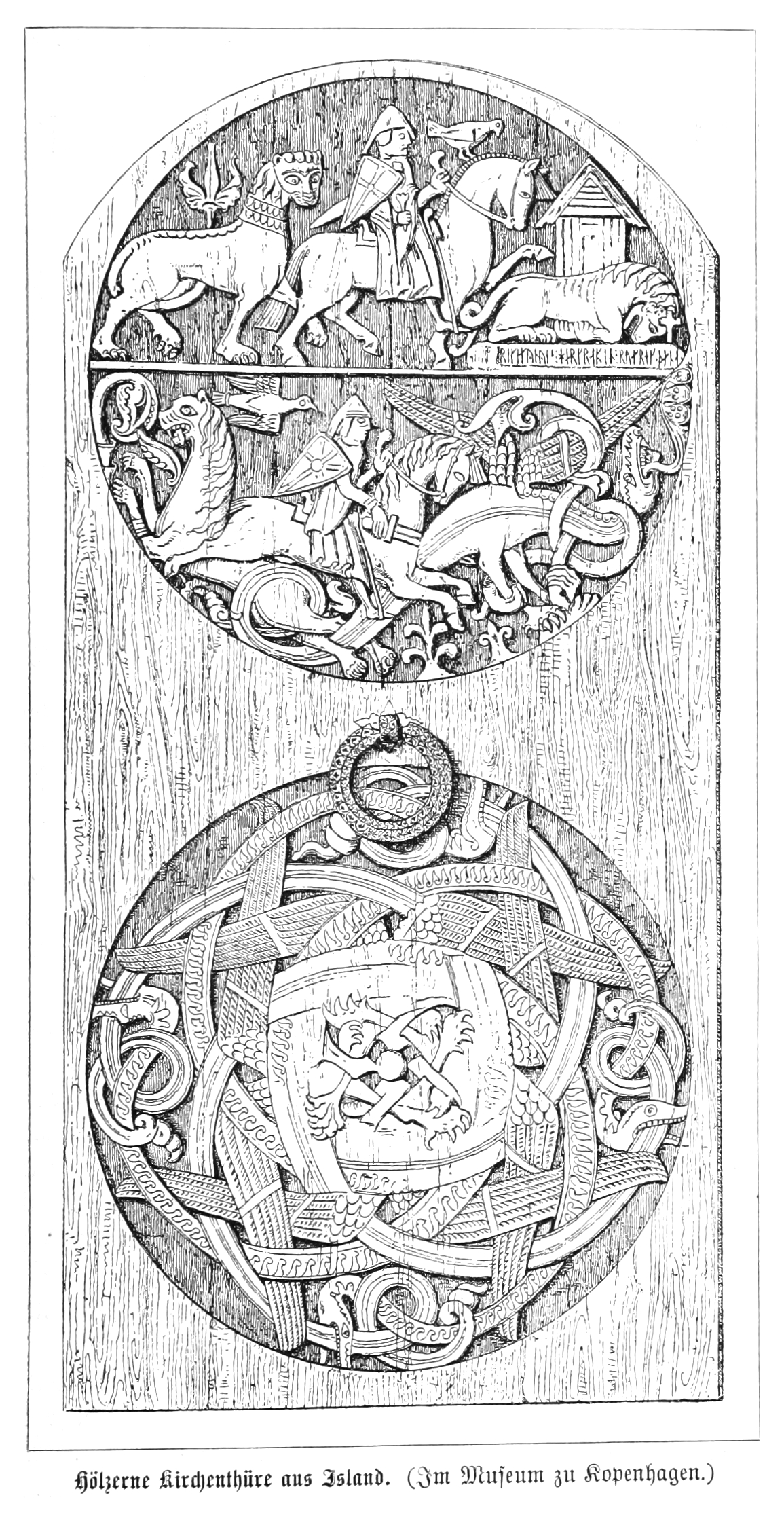
The Valþjófsstaður door

The Valþjófsstaður door (Icelandic: Valþjófsstaðahurðin [ˈvalˌθjoufsˌstaːðaˌhʏrðɪn]) is a medieval carved church door in the National Museum of Iceland. It depicts a version of the Lion-Knight legend in which a knight slays a dragon, freeing a lion that becomes his loyal companion; this story is similar to the tale of Yvain, the Knight of the Lion and of several Icelandic chivalric sagas. It is the only medieval Icelandic carved door in existence and contains a rare example of runic script carved in wood.

The door is in the Romanesque style (fitted to a semi-circular arch) and carved in pine. At the center is an iron ring that is finely inlaid with silver. A rune at the bottom of the upper carved roundel may be the mark of the master-carver.

== History ==
The door is commonly dated to about 1200 A.D. although old Icelandic documents indicate the original church was built around 1190. A date of no later than 1150 has been argued, based on the style of the knight's dress and equipment, particularly the helm (with nasal and back-piece) and the saddle type. The earliest known reference to the door is a mention by Bishop Brynjólfur Sveinsson in his Visitation Book dated 1641.

In 1851, the priest of the church sent the door to the Royal Museum of Northern Antiquities in Copenhagen (now the National Museum of Denmark.) At that time it underwent restoration work and layers of paint were removed.

In 1930, the door was returned to Iceland for the 1000-year anniversary of the establishment of the Althing (parliament of Iceland) and is now on permanent exhibition in the National Museum of Iceland

It has been speculated that the door may originally have belonged to a different structure; another speculation is that it may have been modified from a much taller original door with a third carved roundel.

== Subject ==
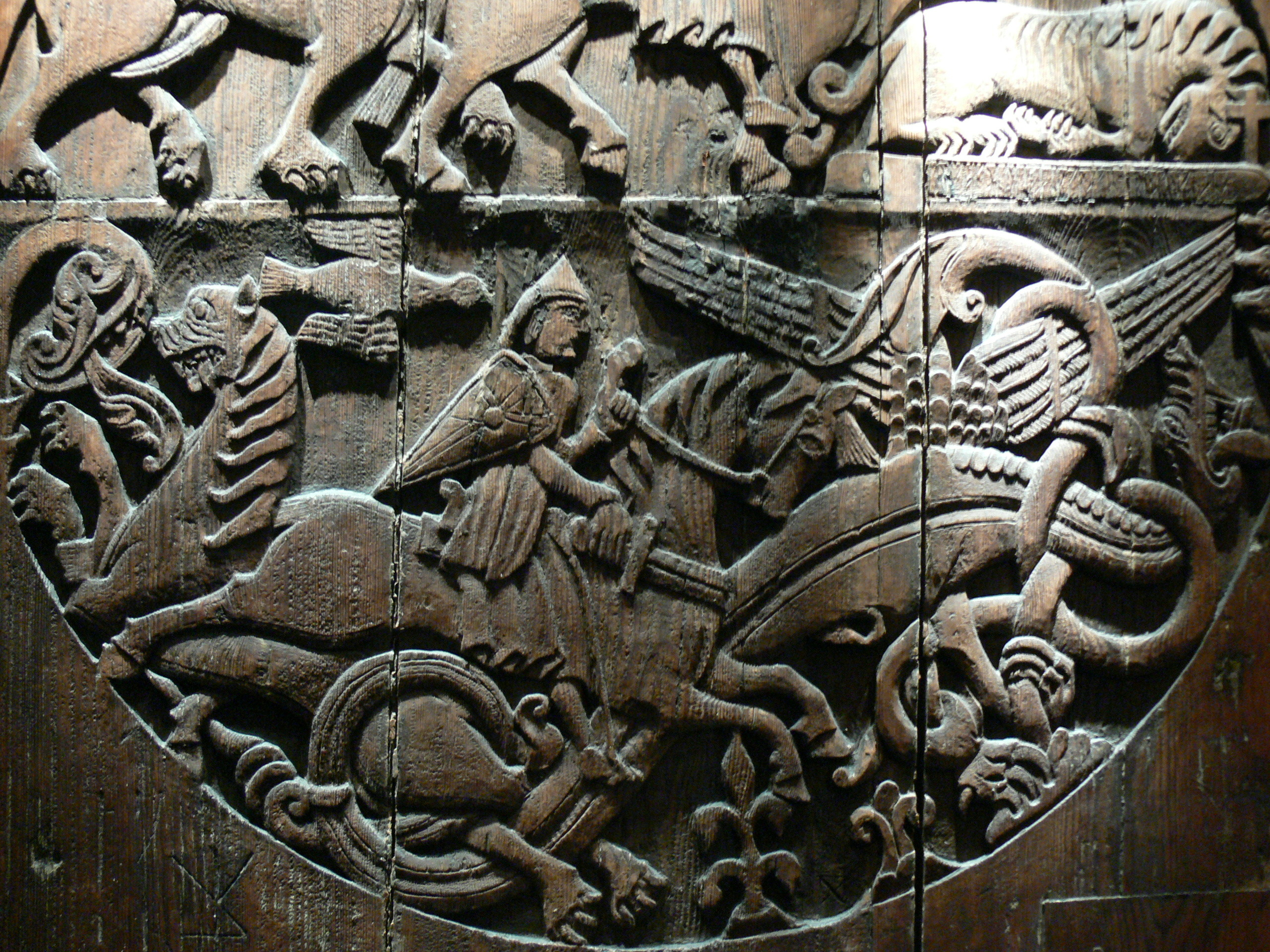
A knight kills a dragon to free a lion

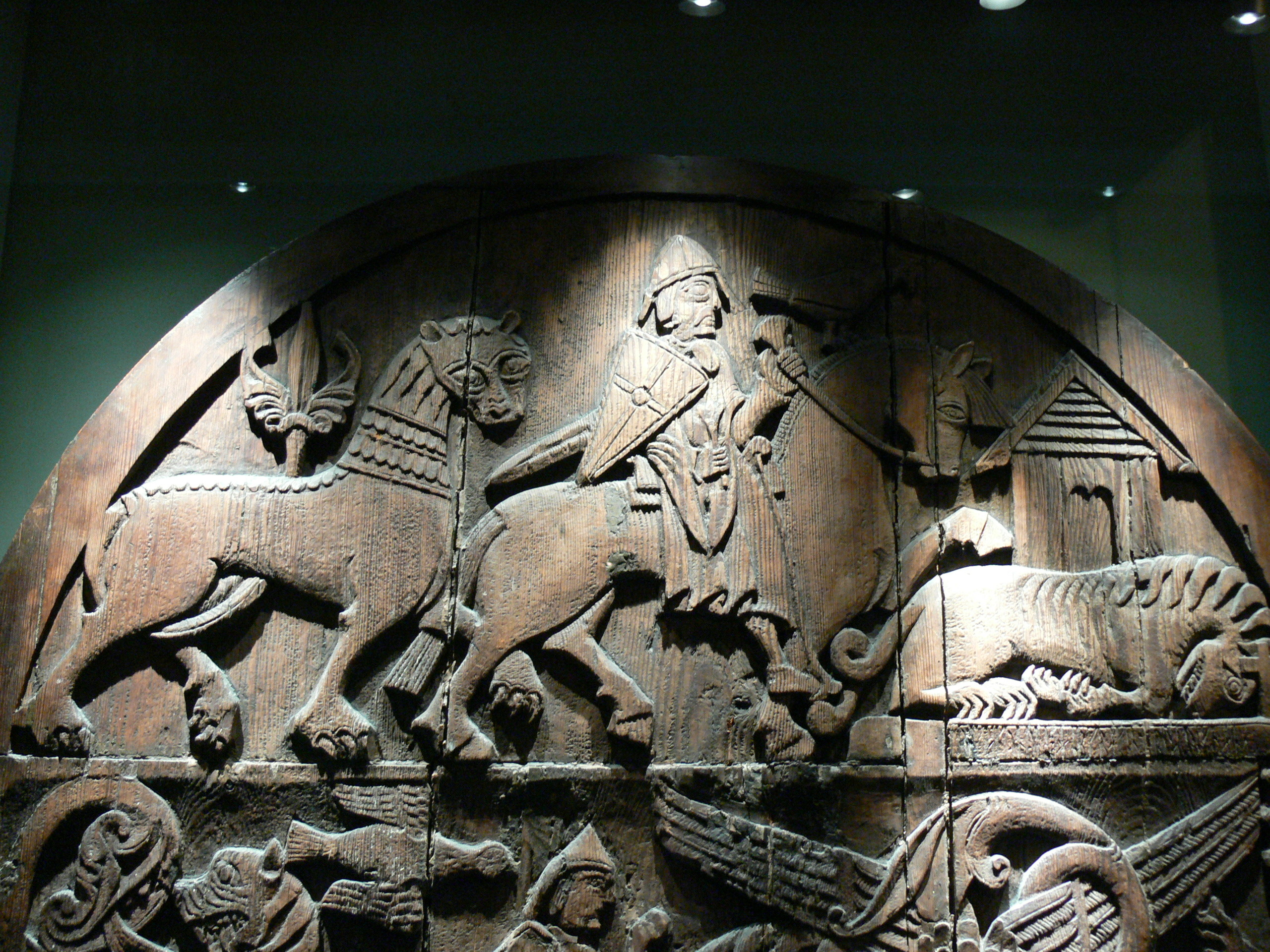
The lion follows the knight, and later lies on his grave

=== The Knight and the Lion ===
The upper carved roundel is divided into two halves. The lower half of the roundel depicts a mounted knight piercing a dragon with his sword while a bird flies overhead. A lion, facing left, appears to be trying to escape the dragon's coils. The dragon is depicted with two claws, two wings (feathered, rather than bat-like) and the body of a serpent. At the far right appear three small heads with long snouts; these have been interpreted to represent three young dragons in their den. The upper half of the roundel shows a mounted knight with a hunting bird, followed by a lion wearing a richly decorated collar. Finally on the upper right, the body of an emaciated lion lies on a grave marked by a cross with what may be a church in the background. The grave is inscribed with line of runes.

The story depicted is a variant of the legend of the lion-knight that is told in Chrétien de Troyes' Yvain, the Knight of the Lion and in several Icelandic sagas, including Þiðreks saga af Bern, Konráðs saga keisarasonar, Vilhjálms saga sjóðs, and Sigurðar saga þögla. The estimated age of the door suggests that it is older than all but Yvain, and so it is the earliest Icelandic example of the legend. Harris compares the different variants of the tale and concludes that the door is more closely related to the Icelandic sagas than Yvain, suggesting the existence of an older source in Icelandic oral tradition.

A contemporary context might be to the Saxon king Henry the Lion, as signified by the ravens in the picture and the heraldic Plantagenet lilies of his wife, Mathilde.

=== The Four Dragons ===
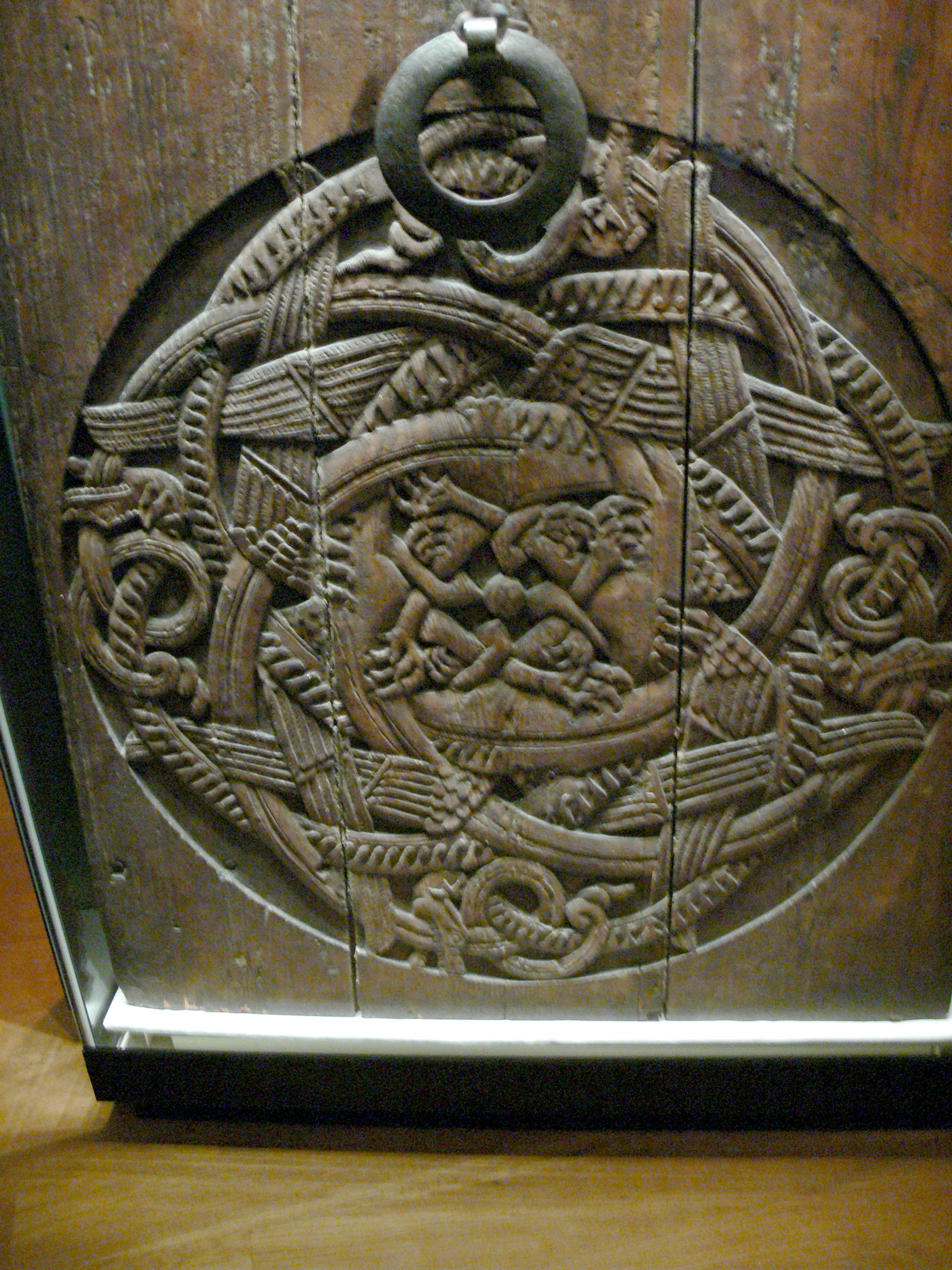
A design of four intertwined dragons

The lower roundel of the door shows four dragons, each dragon biting its own tail to form a ring, a well-known symbol in Norse mythology (known elsewhere as an ouroboros.) The four rings are elaborately intertwined and arranged in a cruciform pattern. As in the upper roundel, each dragon has two wings, two claws, and a long serpent-like body. The runic inscription leaves no doubt as to the identification of this type of creature as a dragon (dreka.)

These four dragons may relate to the four dragons of the upper roundel, that is, the dragon shown slain by the knight and the three dragon heads to the right.

=== Runic Inscription ===
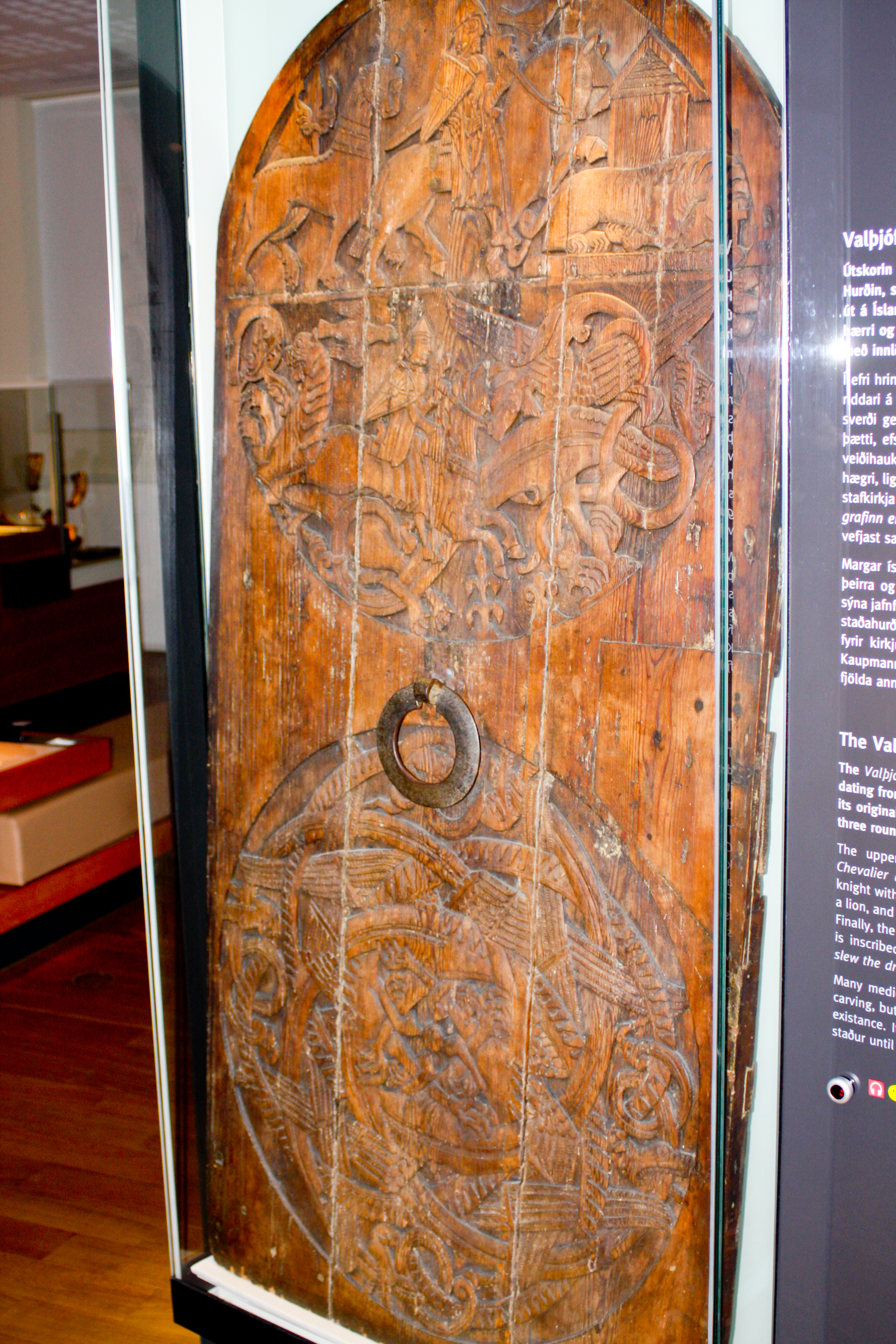
The Valþjófsstaður door in the National Museum of Iceland

An inscription of medieval runes appears on the presumed grave of the knight; the runes are difficult to read and a reading was not published until 1868 by George Stephens of the University of Copenhagen. He speculated that there may be some runes missing from the beginning, due to repair work that inserted a long piece of wood to fill a wide crack. Stephens describes in detail a reading of the sometimes faint and problematic runes and transliterates the runes as the following (missing runes are supplied in square brackets):

[SE HIN] RIKIA KÜNÜNG HER GRAFIN [E]R UA DREKA ÞÆNA.

Stevens gives the following literal translation:

[SEE YON (that)] RICH (mighty) KING HERE GRAVEN (buried) AS (who) WOOG (slew) DRAKE (dragon) THÆN (this).

This inscription appears in the Scandinavian Runic-text Data Base as entry IS IR;181.

== Reproductions ==
The church at Valþjófsstaður contains a modern hand-carved copy of the door. Stephens mentions a copy in the South Kensington Museum (now the Victoria and Albert Museum). A plaster cast copy also stands in the Hall of Architecture of the Carnegie Museum of Art, Pittsburgh.

== See also ==
- Legends about Theodoric the Great
- European dragon

== Bibliography ==
- Bæksted, Anders (1942), Islands Runeindskrifter, København: E. Munksgaard
- Blom, Otto (1871), "De udskaarne Kirkedore fra Valthjofstad og Hyllestad", Aarbøger for nordisk Oldkyndighed og Historie: 229–248
- Hallgrimsson, Helgi (2006), "Stafkirkja og rauðviðarskáli á Valþjófsstað.", Múlaþing, 33: 123–141
- Harris, Richard L. (1970), "The Lion-Knight Legend in Iceland and the Valþjófsstaðir Door", Viator, 1: 125–145, doi:10.1484/J.VIATOR.2.301713
- "National Museum of Iceland – The Valþjófsstaður Door". 2012. Archived from the original on March 29, 2016.
- Otte, Albert (2022), Die Kirchentür von Valthjofsstad in Island als Denkmal für Heinrich den Löwen
- Ólsen, Björn M. (1884), "Valþjófsstaðahurðin", Árbók Hins íslenzka fornleifafélags: 24–37
- Paulsen, Peter (1966), Drachenkämpfer, Löwenritter und die Heinrichsage: eine Studie über die Kirchentür von Valthjofsstad auf Island (in German), Köln: Böhlau
- Stephens, George (1873), "On a runic door from Iceland" (PDF), Archaeologia Scotica, 5: 249–260
- Stephens, George (1869), "Rune-Doren fra Island", Illustreret Tidende, 10 (508): 325–326
- Worsaae, J. J. A. (1859), Nordiske oldsager i det Kongelige museum i Kjöbenhavn. (in Danish), Kjöbenhavn: Kittendorff & Aagaard, p. 127
