= Kristján Guðmundsson =

Icelandic conceptual artist

Kristján Guðmundsson (1941-2025), born in Snæfellsnes, Iceland), was a contemporary Icelandic conceptual artist.

He started his career as an artist in the 1960s as a member of SÚM - a group of young artists influenced by then-new currents in conceptual and installation art.

He lived in the Netherlands in the 1970s where he received a Dutch stipend. There he came into more direct contact with the international avant-garde. In 1977, he was one of four Icelanders invited to exhibit in the new-opened Centre Georges Pompidou in Paris, France. He moved back to Iceland in 1979.

Kristján's art reflects both prevailing traditions in late 20th century western art in general, and the dominance of abstract and conceptual art in the post-war art of Iceland in particular. He has said, "I am trying to work within the field of tension that exists between nothing and something".

In 1982 he represented Iceland at the Venice Biennale. 1993 he was one of three winners of the Prince Eugen Medal conferred by the King of Sweden. In 2010 he was the first Icelandic winner who got the Swedish Carnegie Art Award, worth SEK 1,000,000. He got it with his sound-absorbing pieces.

Kristján is the brother of artist Sigurður Guðmundssson.

== See also ==
- Conceptual art
