= Icelandic tail-cap =

Part of the Icelandic national costume

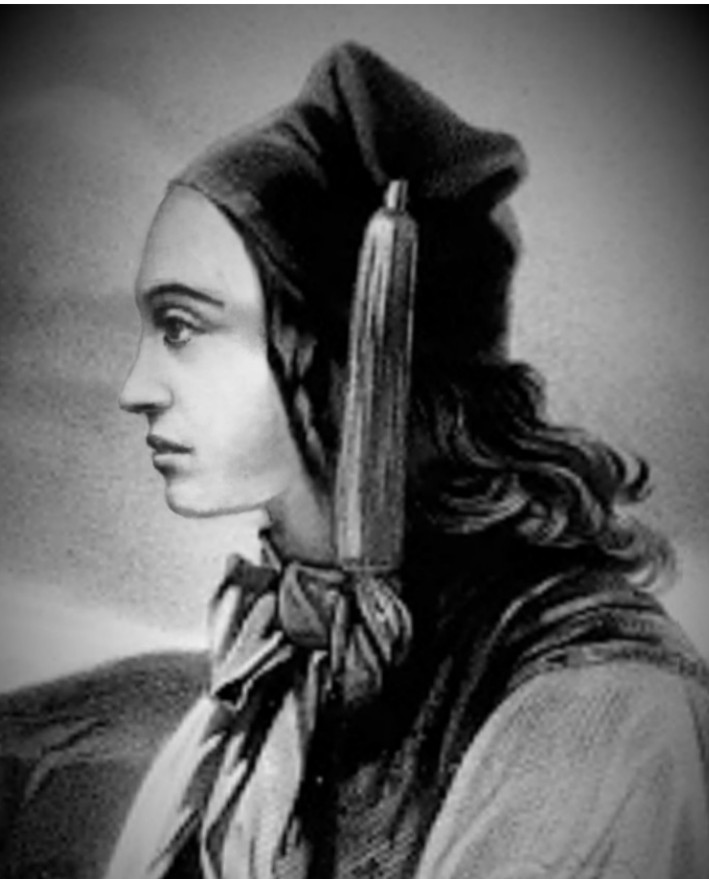
19th century Icelandic woman wearing a deep tail cap

The Icelandic tail-cap or skotthúfa is a typical part of the Icelandic national costume. Originally it was only worn by men, but starting in the 18th century women started to wear it along with the peysa, a men's jacket with a single row of buttons creating the proto-peysuföt. Later it was adopted for the bodice-dress (upphlutsbúningur ).

The men's version is usually striped, while the women's is almost always black. While the men's version was knitted from fairly coarse wool the women's version used a small string with a tassel made of fine wool and later sewed with velvet with a silk tassel (35 – 38 cm.).

In the beginning of the 19th century, the tail-cap was rather deep, but from 1860 it was replaced by the modern, shorter version. The tassel and cap are connected with a tassel-cylinder (skúfhólkur) made of silver or gold. The cap is pinned in the hair by means of a black knitting-pin but if the woman wears plaits, the end of them are fastened under the cap in the neck with a typical cap-pin.

== See also ==
- List of hat styles
