= Höfðaletur =

Höfðaletur (Icelandic pronunciation: [ˈhœvðaˌlɛːtʏr̥]; "head letters") is an unusual Icelandic style of lettering used in carving that has recently been adapted for use in printing. The letters do not have a fixed form.

== History ==
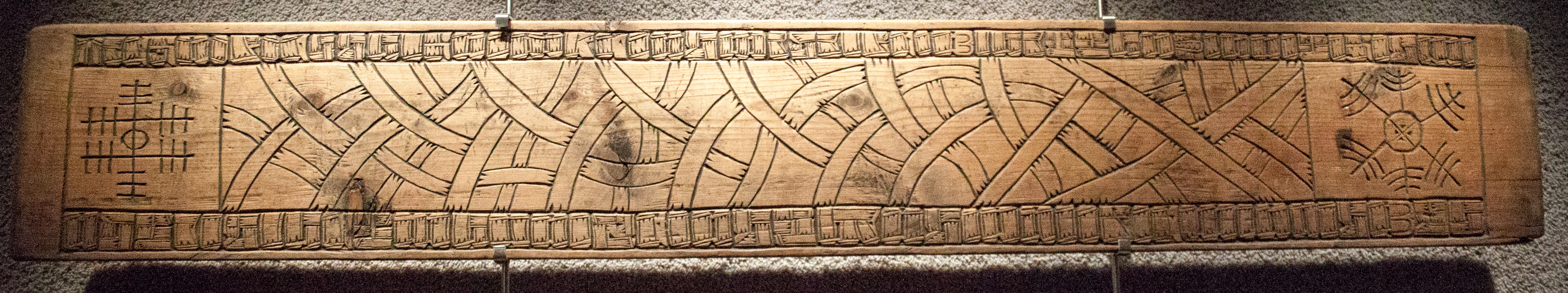
Bed-panel with verse in Höfðaletur lettering; National Museum of Iceland

The oldest known examples of Höfðaletur are thought to be 16th century, and the style is considered to have been modeled on Gothic textura.

The letters do not have a fixed form, but the verticals all have a "head" that is decorated with carving, usually simple and sloping but sometimes double. There are many conjectures about the derivation of the name höfðaletur, but no definite evidence exists.

Older examples of Höfðaletur are carved on wood and are always deeply incised so that the letters are in relief. Modern examples may also be found on metal objects, such as wedding rings. According to Brynjúlfur Jónsson, Höfðaletur replaced the quite different Spónaletur ("spoon-letters") on spoons and other silver objects in the late nineteenth century.

== Modern uses ==
Some Icelandic font developers have experimented with Höfðaletur, including Gunnlaug Briem, Hörður Lárusson, Sigurður Orri Þórhannesson and Sól Hrafnsdóttir. The lettering features on the coat of arms of Akranes

The National Museum of Iceland uses höfðaletur as part of their visual identity.
