= Sigurður Guðmundsson =

Icelandic artist (born 1942)

Sigurður Guðmundsson (born 20 September 1942) is an Icelandic artist.

== Early life and education ==
Gudmundsson was born in Reykjavik, Iceland, the son of a frame-maker and art dealer Gudmundur Árnason and his wife Áslaug Sigurdardóttir and the brother of artist Kristján Guðmundsson. He studied at the Icelandic College of Arts and Crafts, Reykjavik and at the Academie '63 (later De Ateliers '63) in Haarlem.

== Life and work ==
After returning to Iceland in 1966, with his wife and son, he became part of the Sύm group of artists, who had no single philosophy but shared characteristics with the international Fluxus movement and recognised the importance of a playful, innovative environment.

Gudmundsson had his first solo show in February 1969 in Sύm's exhibition space Galerí Sύm. His manifesto for the exhibition A few words about art included a series of statements about what art is and is not, for example "Art is not about showing how skilful the artist is, Art is not there to delight your eye, Art is a way of living life." This year also saw him organise an exhibition of Dutch art in Iceland in collaboration with the Dutch Ministry of Culture.

In 1970, he left Iceland for a second time to settle in the Netherlands. In 1972 he had a solo show at Now Construction in Amsterdam, where he exhibited his Untitled (Ice-philosophy) work consisting of Icelandic sentences made of ice, which melted away during the exhibition.

In the 1970s Gudmundsson worked on visual poetry, 'observed poems', as well as performance 'situations', photography and sculpture. In November 1971, he made a drawing of stones on a hill-top in Cornwall, A Project for the Wind, in response to the direction of the wind over four days. During the same visit he also made a sculpture in response to the changing wind directions over four days.

In the 1980s and 1990s Gudmundsson's practice focussed on making sculptures starting with works such as Het Grote Gedicht (The Great Poem) (1980–81) and Stella Maris, Kantadorum (1981). Gudmundsson has exhibited widely internationally and had his first solo show in the UK at the Baltic Centre for Contemporary Art in Gateshead in 2003.

== General references ==
- "Sigurdur Gudmundsson". www.galerievangelder.com.
- "Sigurdur Gudmundsson". Moderna Museet i Malmö.
- "Sigurdur Gudmundsson — in-out center archives". inoutcenterarchives.nl.
- "Gudmundsson, Sigurdur, b.1942 - Art UK". artuk.org.
- "Baltic Plus - Sigurdur Gudmundsson (05)". balticplus.uk.
- "Sigurdur Gudmundsson, Baltic, Gateshead". The Guardian. 30 January 2003.
