= Gonjače =

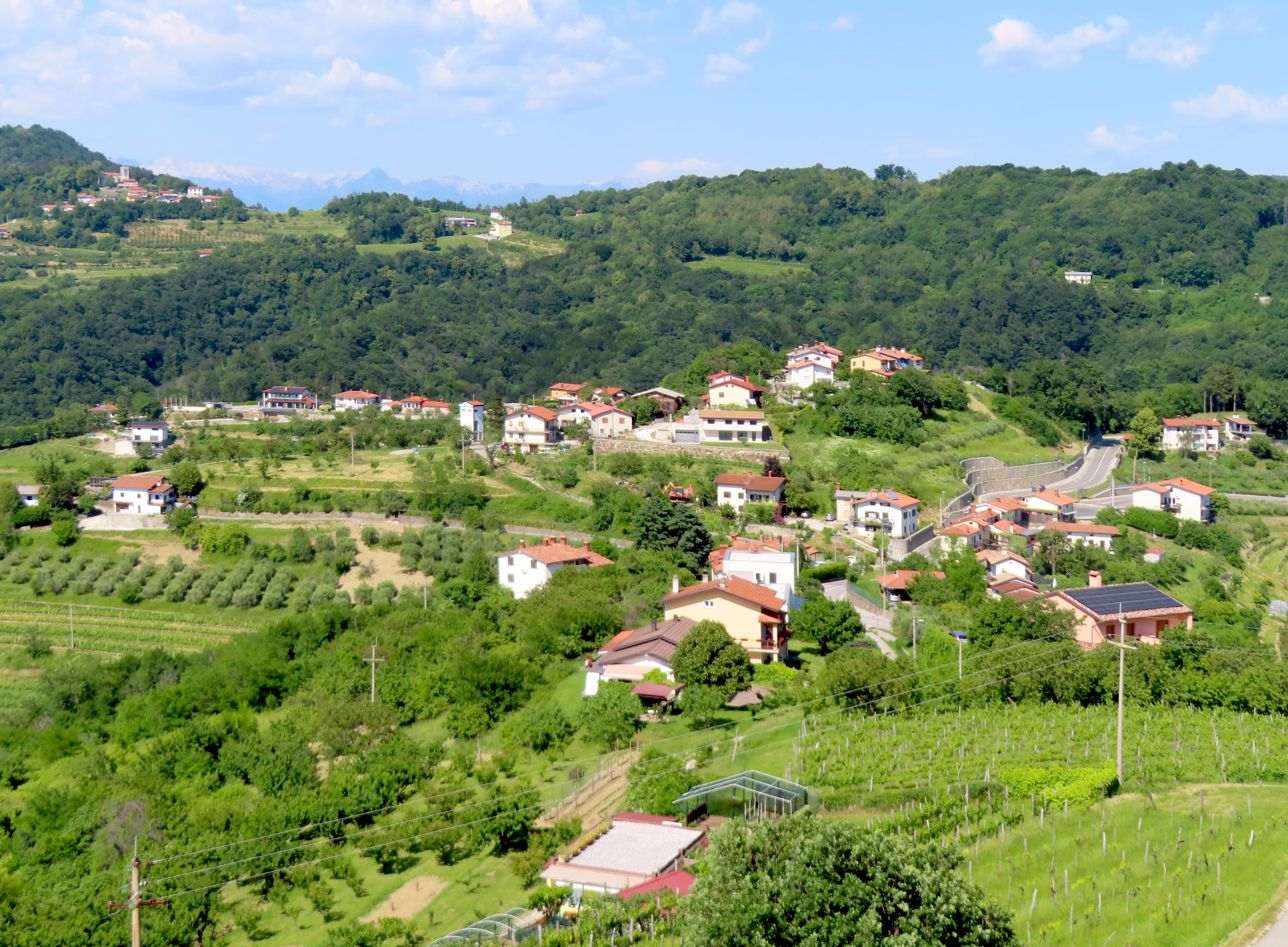

- Location in Slovenia
- Coordinates: 46°0′43.45″N 13°33′55.52″E
- Country: Slovenia
- Traditional region: Slovenian Littoral
- Statistical region: Gorizia
- Municipality: Brda

Area
  - Total: 1.48 km^{2} (0.57 sq mi)
- Elevation: 291.1 m (955 ft)

Population (2020)
  - Total: 170
  - Density: 110/km^{2} (300/sq mi)

Gonjače (pronounced [ɡɔˈnjaːtʃɛ]) is a village in the Municipality of Brda in the Littoral region of Slovenia.

== Geography ==
Gonjače is a somewhat scattered settlement between Kojsko and Šmartno along the road from Vrhovlje pri Kojskem to Dobrovo. The village includes the neighborhoods of V Koncu and Na Vrhu as well as the hamlet of Bale to the southwest. The houses largely stand along a narrow ridge that falls steeply into the adjacent valleys. To the west, rainfall drains into watercourses flowing into Reka Creek (a tributary of the Idrija River, Italian: Iudrio), and to the west into Birša Creek, which flows into Italy as the Versa and joins the Iudrio further downstream. Springs in the area include Močilo, Polje, and Gabrovica.

== History ==
During the Second World War, following the Armistice of Cassibile, a Partisan command post was established in the lower part of the village. A repair shop and an intelligence station were also established there, and Gonjače functioned as an administrative and operative link for the Partisans between the upper and lower Gorizia Hills.

In 1955, a 24-meter (79 ft) viewing tower was installed on Mejnik Hill (elevation: 321 meters or 1,053 feet) in the southwestern part of the village. The tower is illuminated by floodlights at night.

== Cultural heritage ==
The foundations of a church dedicated to Saint Helena are visible in Na Vrhu. The church was razed in the 18th century, during the reign of Emperor Joseph II.
