= Ceglo =

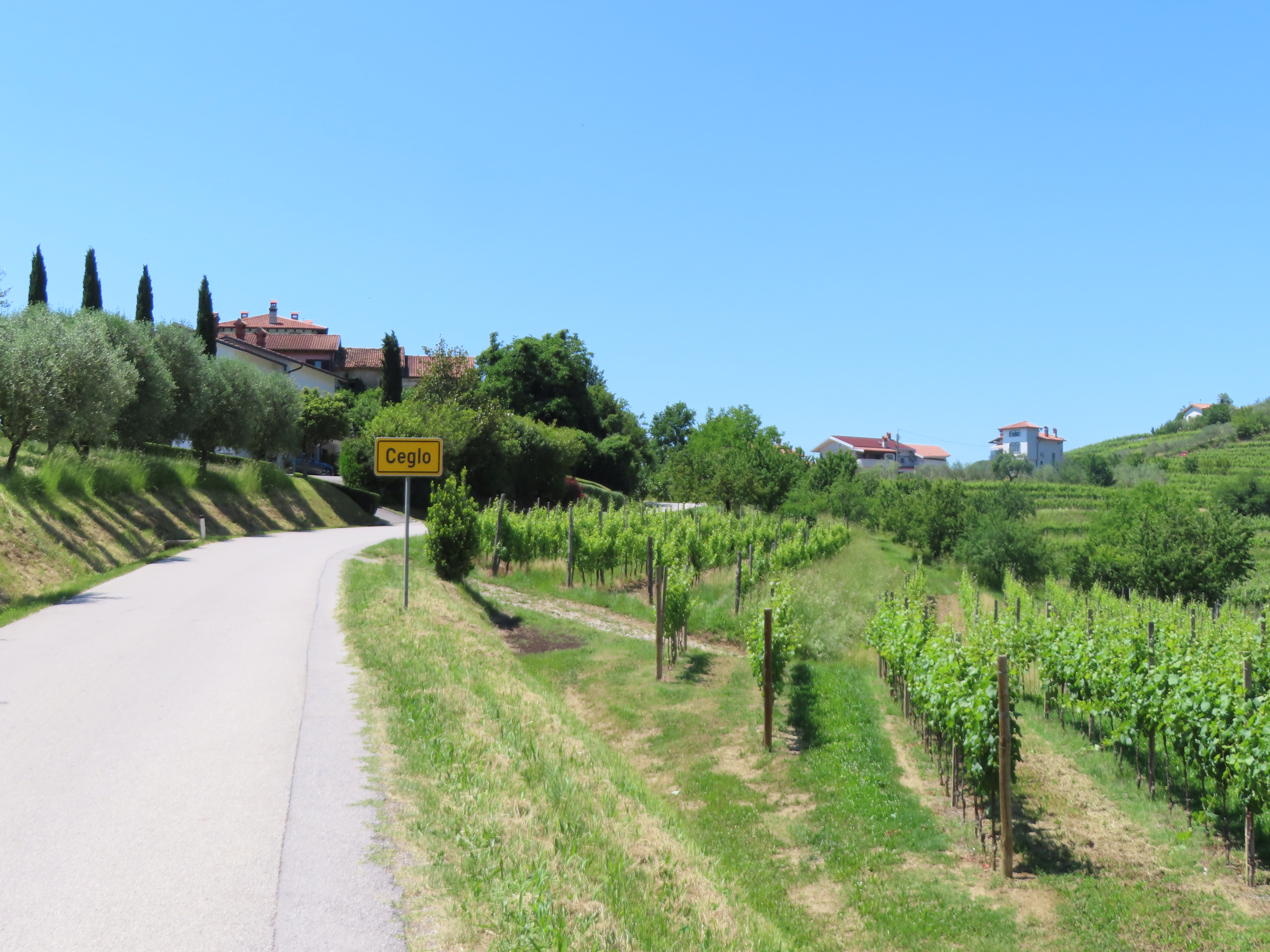

- Location in Slovenia
- Coordinates: 45°58′41.51″N 13°31′11.4″E
- Country: Slovenia
- Traditional region: Slovenian Littoral
- Statistical region: Gorizia
- Municipality: Brda

Area
  - Total: 0.71 km^{2} (0.27 sq mi)
- Elevation: 122.1 m (401 ft)

Population (2020)
  - Total: 112
  - Density: 160/km^{2} (410/sq mi)

Ceglo (pronounced [ˈtseːɡlɔ]) is a settlement south of Medana in the Municipality of Brda in the Littoral region of Slovenia, located in the Gorizia Hills (Slovene: Goriška brda), a wine-producing region on the border with Italy.

== Ceglo Castle ==
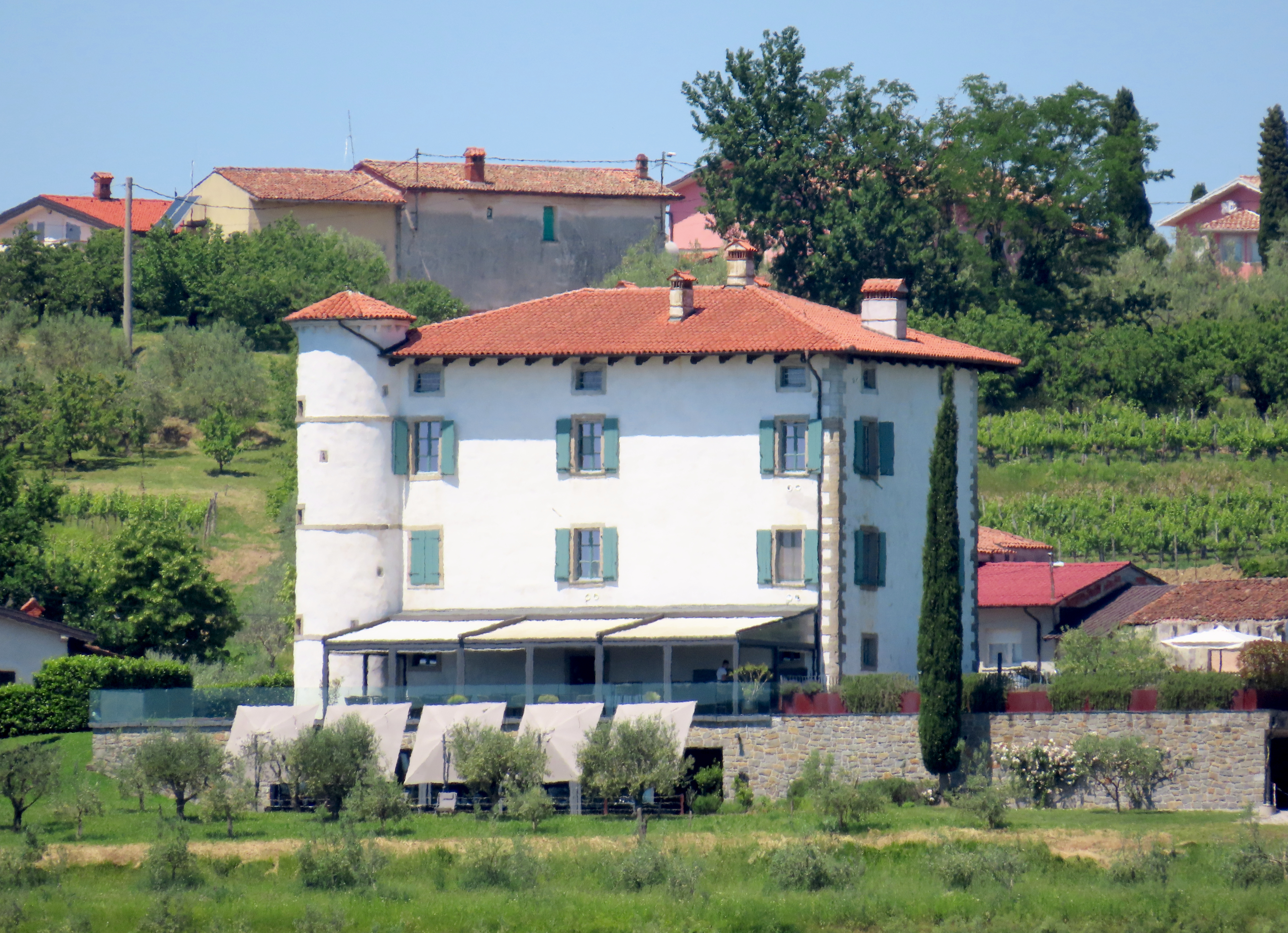
Ceglo Castle

Ceglo Castle (Slovene: Grad Ceglo)—also known as Gradič or the Codelli Villa (Slovene: Codellijeva vila)—stands in the southern part of Ceglo. It is a Rensaissance three-story residential structure with a rectangular layout and a cylindrical corner tower. It is flanked by a chapel from 1774 in the style of Andrea Palladio with a barrel-vaulted chancel and several buildings arranged in a row, including housing for former tenant farmers.
