= Vrhovlje pri Kožbani =

- Location in Slovenia
- Coordinates: 46°2′51″N 13°31′18″E
- Country: Slovenia
- Traditional region: Slovenian Littoral
- Statistical region: Gorizia
- Municipality: Brda

Area
  - Total: 2.68 km^{2} (1.03 sq mi)
- Elevation: 424.6 m (1,393 ft)

Population (2020)
  - Total: 19
  - Density: 7.1/km^{2} (18/sq mi)

Vrhovlje pri Kožbani (pronounced [ʋəɾˈxoːu̯ljɛ pɾi kɔˈʒbaːni]) is a small settlement northwest of Kožbana in the Municipality of Brda in the Littoral region of Slovenia on the border with Italy.

== Geography ==
Vrhovlje pri Kožbani is a clustered settlement between two valleys on the slope of a broad hill that rises to 456 meters (1,496 ft), which is the second-highest elevation in the Gorizia Hills after Korada Hill (811 meters or 2,661 feet). Geologically, the area is located at the transition from flysch to limestone. Jezero Spring lies east of the village center.

== Name ==
The name of the settlement was changed from Vrhovlje to Vrhovlje pri Kožbani in 1953. The settlement is also known as Vrhuje in the local dialect and humorously as Gluho Vrhovlje (literally, 'deaf Vrhovlje'), in contrast to nearby Vrhovlje pri Kojskem (dubbed Slepo Vrhovlje 'blind Vrhovlje').

== Church ==
The local church is dedicated to Saint Andrew and belongs to the Parish of Kožbana.

== Notable people ==
Notable people that were born or lived in Vrhovlje pri Kožbani include:

- Miloš Kamuščič (1852–1922), school teacher and writer
