= Snežeče =

- Location in Slovenia
- Coordinates: 46°0′20.4″N 13°31′43.63″E
- Country: Slovenia
- Traditional region: Slovenian Littoral
- Statistical region: Gorizia
- Municipality: Brda

Area
  - Total: 0.52 km^{2} (0.20 sq mi)
- Elevation: 143.3 m (470 ft)

Population (2020)
  - Total: 45
  - Density: 87/km^{2} (220/sq mi)

Snežeče (pronounced [snɛˈʒeːtʃɛ]) is a settlement north of Dobrovo in the Municipality of Brda in the Littoral region of Slovenia.

The local church is dedicated to Our Lady of the Snows and belongs to the Parish of Biljana.
