= Brdice pri Neblem =

- Location in Slovenia
- Coordinates: 46°0′22.03″N 13°30′29.22″E
- Country: Slovenia
- Traditional region: Slovenian Littoral
- Statistical region: Gorizia
- Municipality: Brda

Area
  - Total: 0.62 km^{2} (0.24 sq mi)
- Elevation: 128.2 m (421 ft)

Population (2020)
  - Total: 55
  - Density: 89/km^{2} (230/sq mi)

Brdice pri Neblem (pronounced [ˈbəɾditsɛ pɾi ˈneːblɛm]) is a small settlement northwest of Dobrovo near Neblo in the Municipality of Brda in the Littoral region of Slovenia.
