= Plešivo =

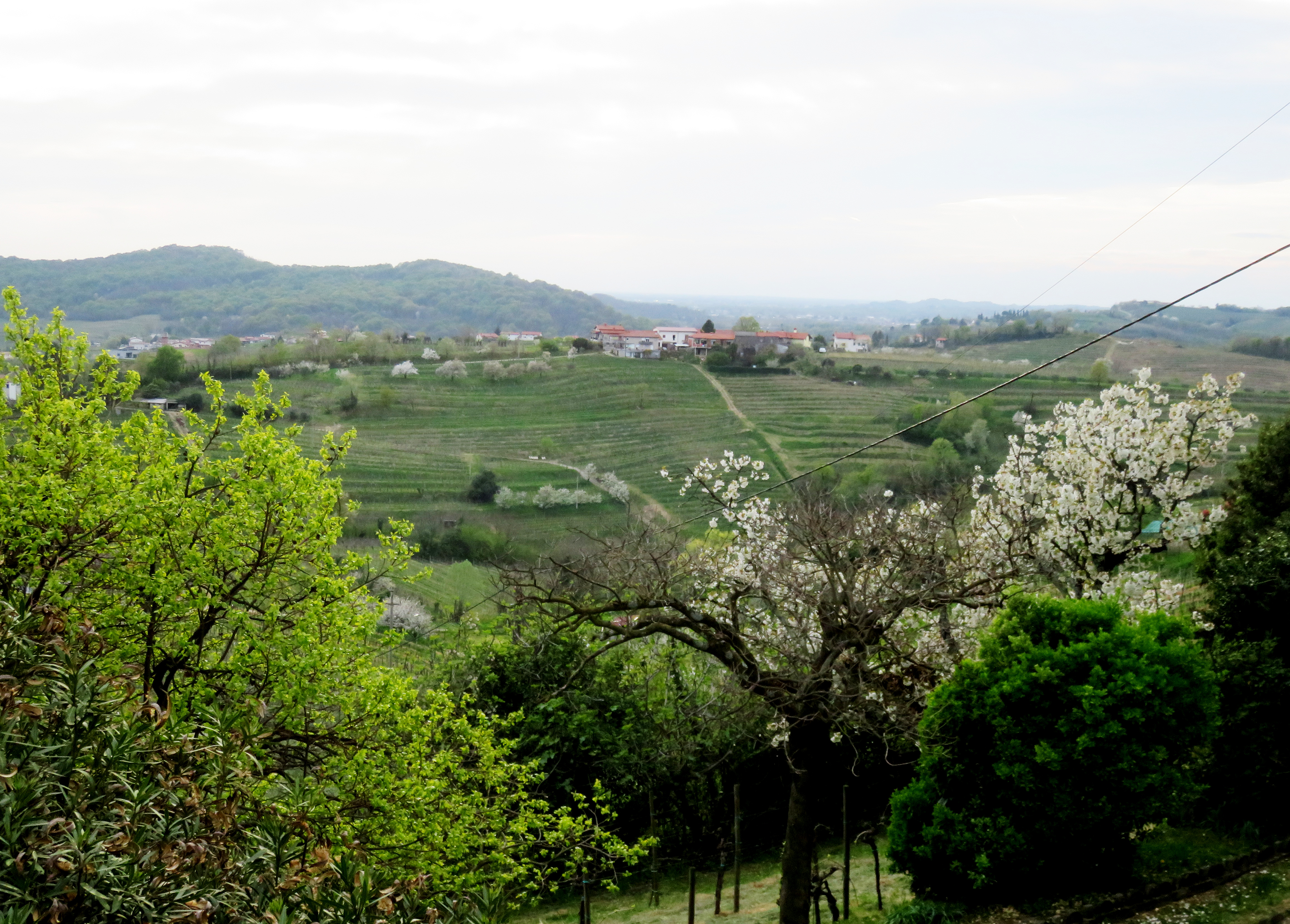

- Location in Slovenia
- Coordinates: 45°58′56.01″N 13°30′15.73″E
- Country: Slovenia
- Traditional region: Slovenian Littoral
- Statistical region: Gorizia
- Municipality: Brda

Area
  - Total: 1.28 km^{2} (0.49 sq mi)
- Elevation: 123.5 m (405 ft)

Population (2020)
  - Total: 220
  - Density: 170/km^{2} (450/sq mi)

Plešivo (pronounced [plɛˈʃiːʋɔ]) is a settlement southwest of Dobrovo in the Municipality of Brda in the Littoral region of Slovenia on the border with Italy.

The wider area is known for viticulture because Plešivo lies in the Gorizia Hills wine region, one of Slovenia's most prominent wine-producing areas.
