= Krasno, Brda =

Krasno
- Village
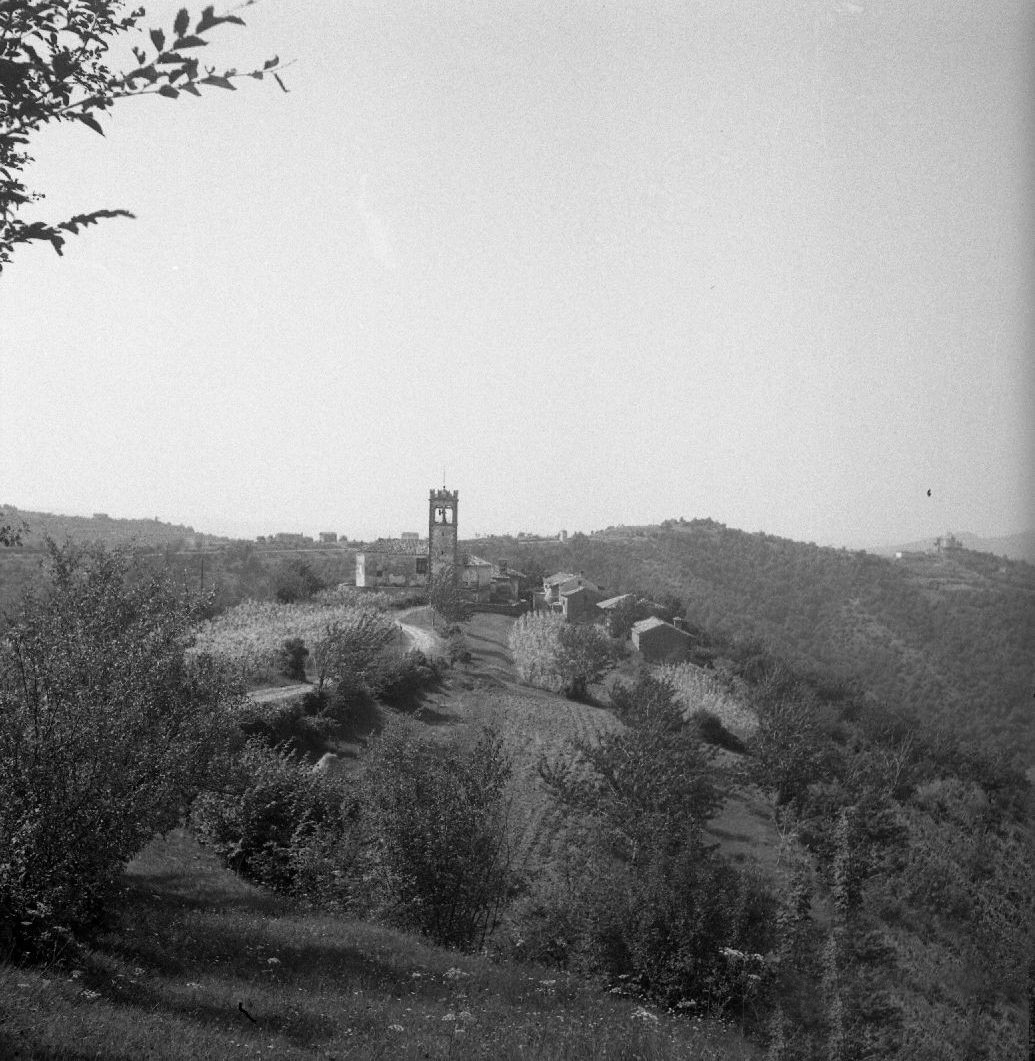
- Krasno in 1953

- Location in Slovenia
- Coordinates: 46°1′25.71″N 13°33′15.83″E
- Country: Slovenia
- Traditional region: Slovenian Littoral
- Statistical region: Gorizia
- Municipality: Brda

Area
  - Total: 2.53 km^{2} (0.98 sq mi)
- Elevation: 265.5 m (871 ft)

Population (2020)
  - Total: 99
  - Density: 39/km^{2} (100/sq mi)

Krasno (pronounced [ˈkɾaːsnɔ]) is a settlement in the Municipality of Brda in the Littoral region of Slovenia.

The local church is dedicated to Mary Magdalene and belongs to the Parish of Gradno.
