= Zali Breg =

- Location in Slovenia
- Coordinates: 46°0′17.56″N 13°32′14.85″E
- Country: Slovenia
- Traditional region: Slovenian Littoral
- Statistical region: Gorizia
- Municipality: Brda

Area
  - Total: 0.5 km^{2} (0.19 sq mi)
- Elevation: 157.8 m (518 ft)

Population (2020)
  - Total: 73
  - Density: 150/km^{2} (380/sq mi)

Zali Breg (pronounced [ˈzaːli ˈbɾeːk]) is a small dispersed settlement northeast of Dobrovo in the Municipality of Brda in the Littoral region of Slovenia.
