= Kozarno =

- Location in Slovenia
- Coordinates: 46°0′34.95″N 13°31′16.75″E
- Country: Slovenia
- Traditional region: Slovenian Littoral
- Statistical region: Gorizia
- Municipality: Brda

Area
  - Total: 0.63 km^{2} (0.24 sq mi)
- Elevation: 142.7 m (468 ft)

Population (2020)
  - Total: 46
  - Density: 73/km^{2} (190/sq mi)

Kozarno (pronounced [kɔˈzaːɾnɔ]) is a small settlement north of Dobrovo in the Municipality of Brda in the Littoral region of Slovenia.
