= Drnovk, Brda =

Drnovk
- Location in Slovenia
- Coordinates: 46°0′9.21″N 13°31′29.99″E
- Country: Slovenia
- Traditional region: Slovenian Littoral
- Statistical region: Gorizia
- Municipality: Brda

Area
  - Total: 0.62 km^{2} (0.24 sq mi)
- Elevation: 109.1 m (358 ft)

Population (2020)
  - Total: 129
  - Density: 210/km^{2} (540/sq mi)

Drnovk (pronounced [dəɾˈnoːu̯k]) is a settlement north of Dobrovo in the Municipality of Brda in the Littoral region of Slovenia on the border with Italy.
