= Senik, Brda =

Senik
- Location in Slovenia
- Coordinates: 46°3′28.31″N 13°31′46.56″E
- Country: Slovenia
- Traditional region: Slovenian Littoral
- Statistical region: Gorizia
- Municipality: Brda

Area
  - Total: 2.18 km^{2} (0.84 sq mi)
- Elevation: 377.5 m (1,239 ft)

Population (2020)
  - Total: 24
  - Density: 11/km^{2} (29/sq mi)

Senik (pronounced [sɛˈniːk]) is a small village in the Municipality of Brda in the Littoral region of Slovenia, close to the border with Italy.

The local church, built on a small hill just north of the village, is dedicated to Mary Magdalene and belongs to the Parish of Kožbana.
