= Brestje =

- Location in Slovenia
- Coordinates: 46°0′26.49″N 13°35′4.29″E
- Country: Slovenia
- Traditional region: Slovenian Littoral
- Statistical region: Gorizia
- Municipality: Brda

Area
  - Total: 1.91 km^{2} (0.74 sq mi)
- Elevation: 260.6 m (855 ft)

Population (2020)
  - Total: 41
  - Density: 21/km^{2} (56/sq mi)

Brestje (pronounced [ˈbɾeːstjɛ]) is a settlement east of Kojsko in the Municipality of Brda in the Littoral region of Slovenia.
