= Brdice pri Kožbani =

- Location in Slovenia
- Coordinates: 46°2′53.3″N 13°32′9.35″E
- Country: Slovenia
- Traditional region: Slovenian Littoral
- Statistical region: Gorizia
- Municipality: Brda

Area
  - Total: 0.86 km^{2} (0.33 sq mi)
- Elevation: 320.8 m (1,052 ft)

Population (2020)
  - Total: 22
  - Density: 26/km^{2} (66/sq mi)

Brdice pri Kožbani (pronounced [ˈbəɾditsɛ pɾi kɔˈʒbaːni]) is a small settlement northeast of Kožbana in the Municipality of Brda in the Littoral region of Slovenia.
