= Hruševlje =

- Location in Slovenia
- Coordinates: 46°0′57.48″N 13°30′15.25″E
- Country: Slovenia
- Traditional region: Slovenian Littoral
- Statistical region: Gorizia
- Municipality: Brda

Area
  - Total: 1.76 km^{2} (0.68 sq mi)
- Elevation: 132.8 m (436 ft)

Population (2020)
  - Total: 120
  - Density: 68/km^{2} (180/sq mi)

Hruševlje (pronounced [ˈxɾuːʃɛu̯ljɛ]) is a village in the Municipality of Brda in the Littoral region of Slovenia, right on the border with Italy.

The local church is dedicated to Saint Margaret and belongs to the Parish of Šlovrenc.
