= Breg pri Golem Brdu =

- Location in Slovenia
- Coordinates: 46°2′57.01″N 13°29′51.09″E
- Country: Slovenia
- Traditional region: Slovenian Littoral
- Statistical region: Gorizia
- Municipality: Brda

Area
  - Total: 1.09 km^{2} (0.42 sq mi)
- Elevation: 184.9 m (607 ft)

Population (2020)
  - Total: 26
  - Density: 24/km^{2} (62/sq mi)

Breg pri Golem Brdu (pronounced [ˈbɾeːk pɾi ˈɡɔːlɛm ˈbəɾdu]) is a small settlement south of Golo Brdo in the Municipality of Brda in the Littoral region of Slovenia, on the border with Italy.

== Name ==
The name of the settlement was changed from Breg to Breg pri Golem Brdu in 1955.
