= Dolnje Cerovo =

- Location in Slovenia
- Coordinates: 45°58′35.56″N 13°33′8.18″E
- Country: Slovenia
- Traditional region: Slovenian Littoral
- Statistical region: Gorizia
- Municipality: Brda

Area
  - Total: 1.71 km^{2} (0.66 sq mi)
- Elevation: 109 m (358 ft)

Population (2020)
  - Total: 142
  - Density: 83.0/km^{2} (215/sq mi)

Dolnje Cerovo (pronounced [ˈdoːlnjɛ tsɛˈɾɔːʋɔ] or [-ˈɾoː-]) is a settlement in the Municipality of Brda in the Littoral region of Slovenia on the border with Italy.

The local church is dedicated to Saint Lawrence and belongs to the Parish of Cerovo.
