= Barbana =

Barbana may refer to:

== Places ==
- Barban, Croatia
- Barbana, Italy, an island and a Marian sanctuary
- Barbana, Slovenia

== Ships ==
- SS Barbana, later named SS Barbana G
