= Snežatno =

Village in western Slovenia

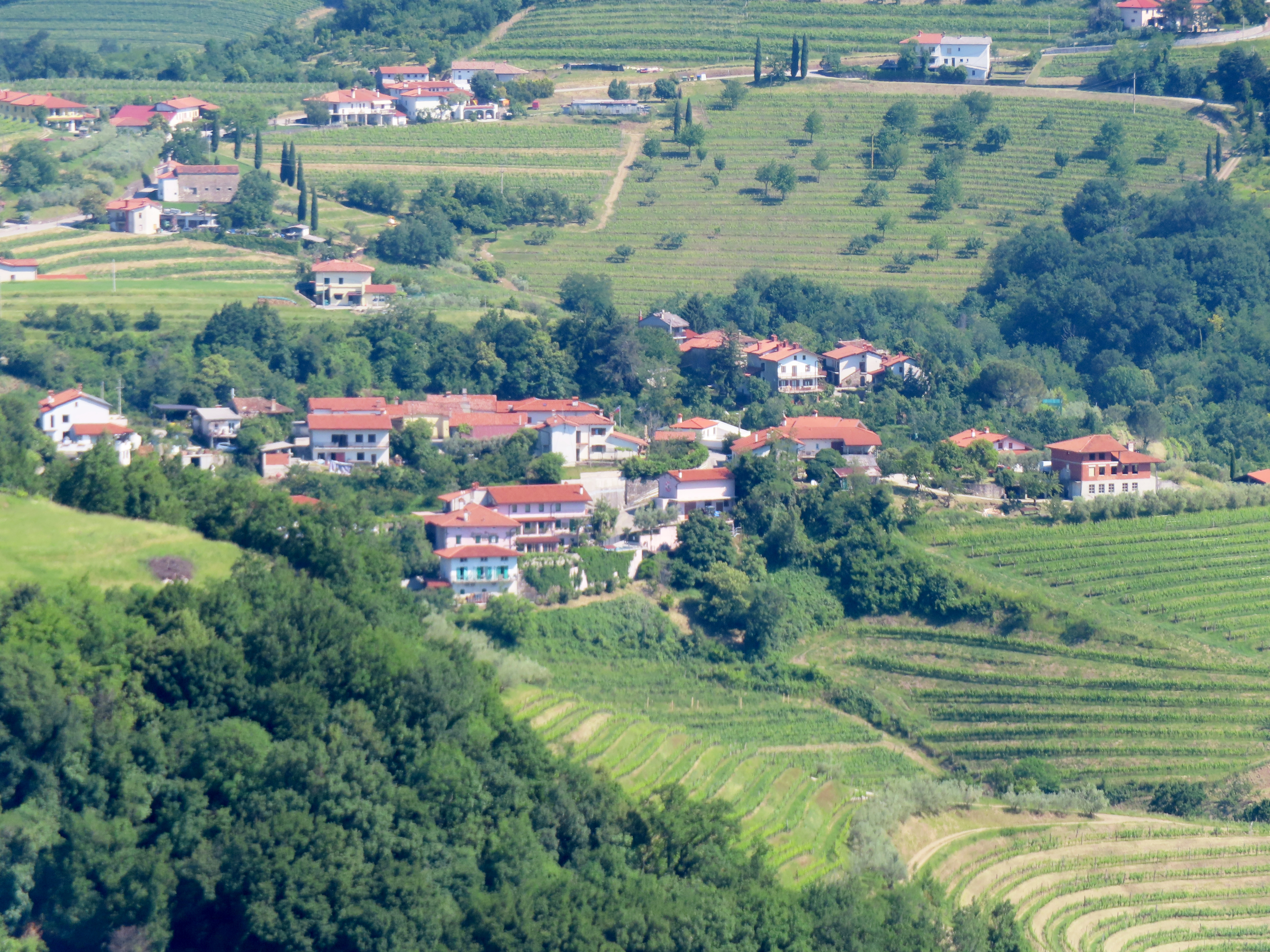

- Location in Slovenia
- Coordinates: 45°59′41.15″N 13°34′12.46″E
- Country: Slovenia
- Traditional region: Slovenian Littoral
- Statistical region: Gorizia
- Municipality: Brda

Area
  - Total: 0.54 km^{2} (0.21 sq mi)
- Elevation: 164.6 m (540 ft)

Population (2020)
  - Total: 89
  - Density: 160/km^{2} (430/sq mi)

Snežatno (pronounced [snɛˈʒaːtnɔ]) is a settlement south of Kojsko in the Municipality of Brda in the Littoral region of Slovenia close to the border with Italy.
