= Fojana =

- Village
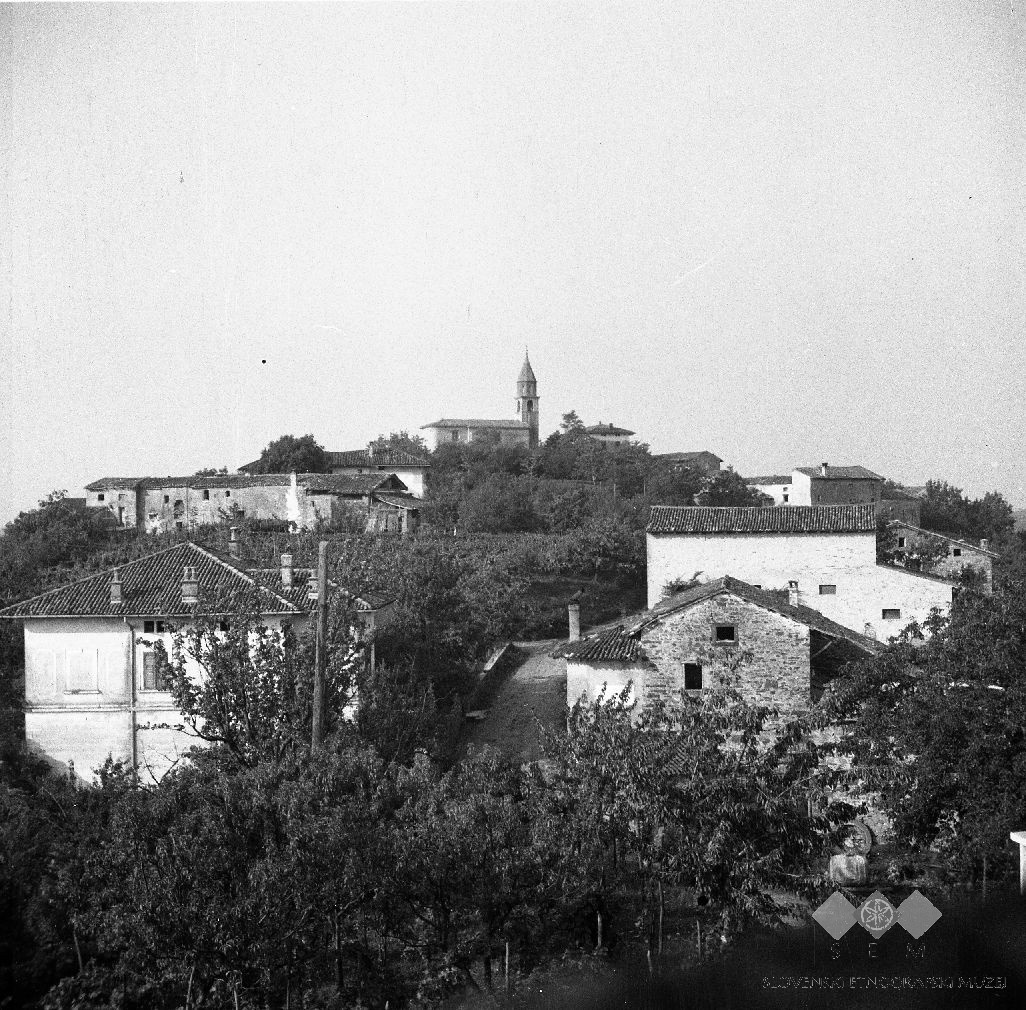
- Fojana in 1953

- Location in Slovenia
- Coordinates: 45°59′52.81″N 13°30′24.42″E
- Country: Slovenia
- Traditional region: Slovenian Littoral
- Statistical region: Gorizia
- Municipality: Brda

Area
  - Total: 1.91 km^{2} (0.74 sq mi)
- Elevation: 154.6 m (507 ft)

Population (2020)
  - Total: 143
  - Density: 74.9/km^{2} (194/sq mi)

Fojana (pronounced [fɔˈjaːna]) is a village west of Dobrovo in the Municipality of Brda in the Littoral region of Slovenia, next to the border with Italy.

== Church ==
The parish church in the village is dedicated to Saint Florian and belongs to the Diocese of Koper. A second church, built just outside the village, is dedicated to the Holy Spirit and belongs to the same parish.

== Notable people ==
Notable people that were born or lived in Fojana include:

- Rado Simoniti (1914–1981), composer and conductor
