= Nozno =

Village in western Slovenia

- Location in Slovenia
- Coordinates: 46°2′14.43″N 13°32′35.03″E
- Country: Slovenia
- Traditional region: Slovenian Littoral
- Statistical region: Gorizia
- Municipality: Brda

Area
  - Total: 2.34 km^{2} (0.90 sq mi)
- Elevation: 355.6 m (1,167 ft)

Population (2020)
  - Total: 27
  - Density: 12/km^{2} (30/sq mi)

Nozno (pronounced [ˈnoːznɔ]) is a small settlement in the Municipality of Brda in the Littoral region of Slovenia.

The local church, built about 1 km west of the settlement, is dedicated to Saints Peter and Paul and belongs to the Parish of Gradno.
