= Belo, Brda =

Belo
- Village
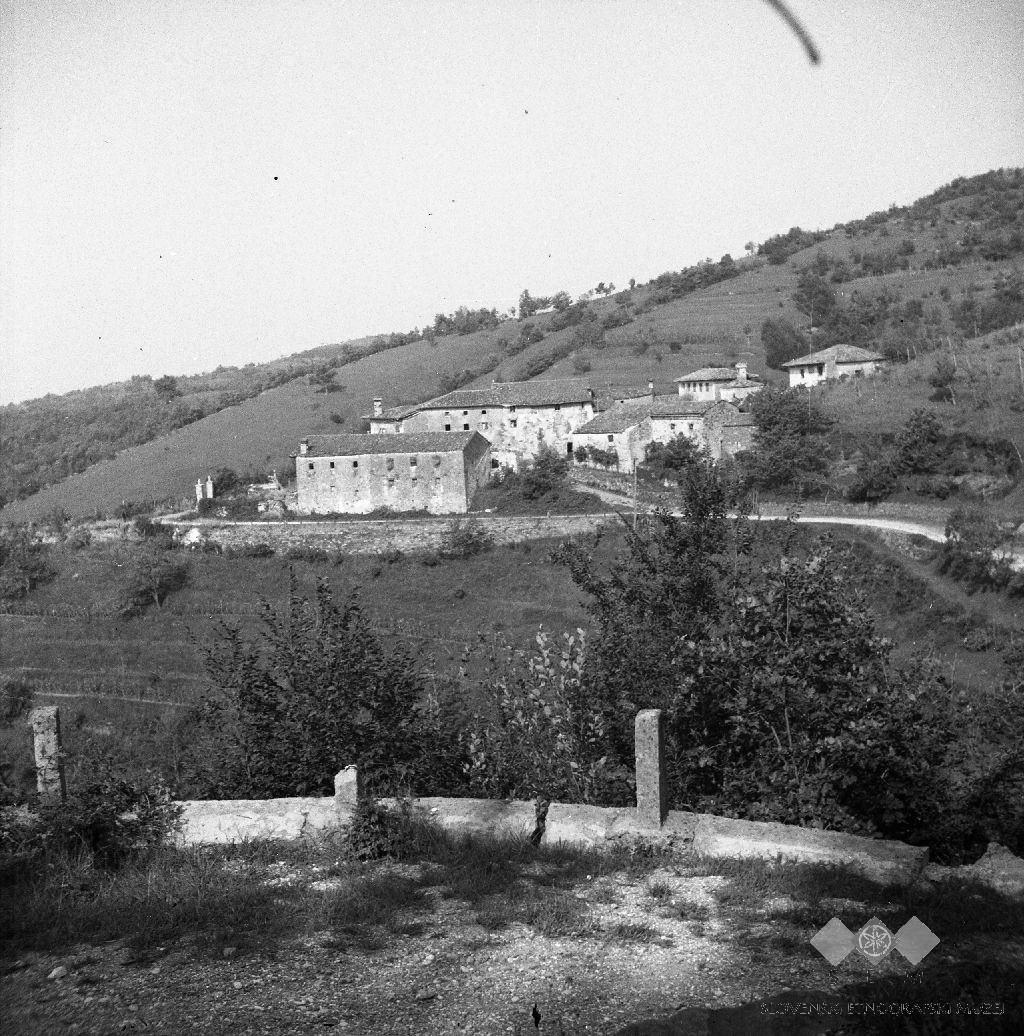
- Belo in 1953

- Location in Slovenia
- Coordinates: 46°1′56.97″N 13°31′46.66″E
- Country: Slovenia
- Traditional region: Slovenian Littoral
- Statistical region: Gorizia
- Municipality: Brda

Area
  - Total: 0.57 km^{2} (0.22 sq mi)
- Elevation: 200.2 m (657 ft)

Population (2020)
  - Total: 9
  - Density: 16/km^{2} (41/sq mi)

Belo (pronounced [ˈbeːlɔ]) is a small settlement in the Municipality of Brda in the Littoral region of Slovenia, close to the border with Italy.
