= Brezovk =

- Location in Slovenia
- Coordinates: 46°2′48.73″N 13°32′29.52″E
- Country: Slovenia
- Traditional region: Slovenian Littoral
- Statistical region: Gorizia
- Municipality: Brda

Area
  - Total: 2.9 km^{2} (1.1 sq mi)
- Elevation: 313.5 m (1,029 ft)

Population (2020)
  - Total: 13
  - Density: 4.5/km^{2} (12/sq mi)

Brezovk (pronounced [ˈbɾeːzɔu̯k]) is a small settlement in the Municipality of Brda the Littoral region of Slovenia.
