= Golo Brdo, Brda =

Golo Brdo
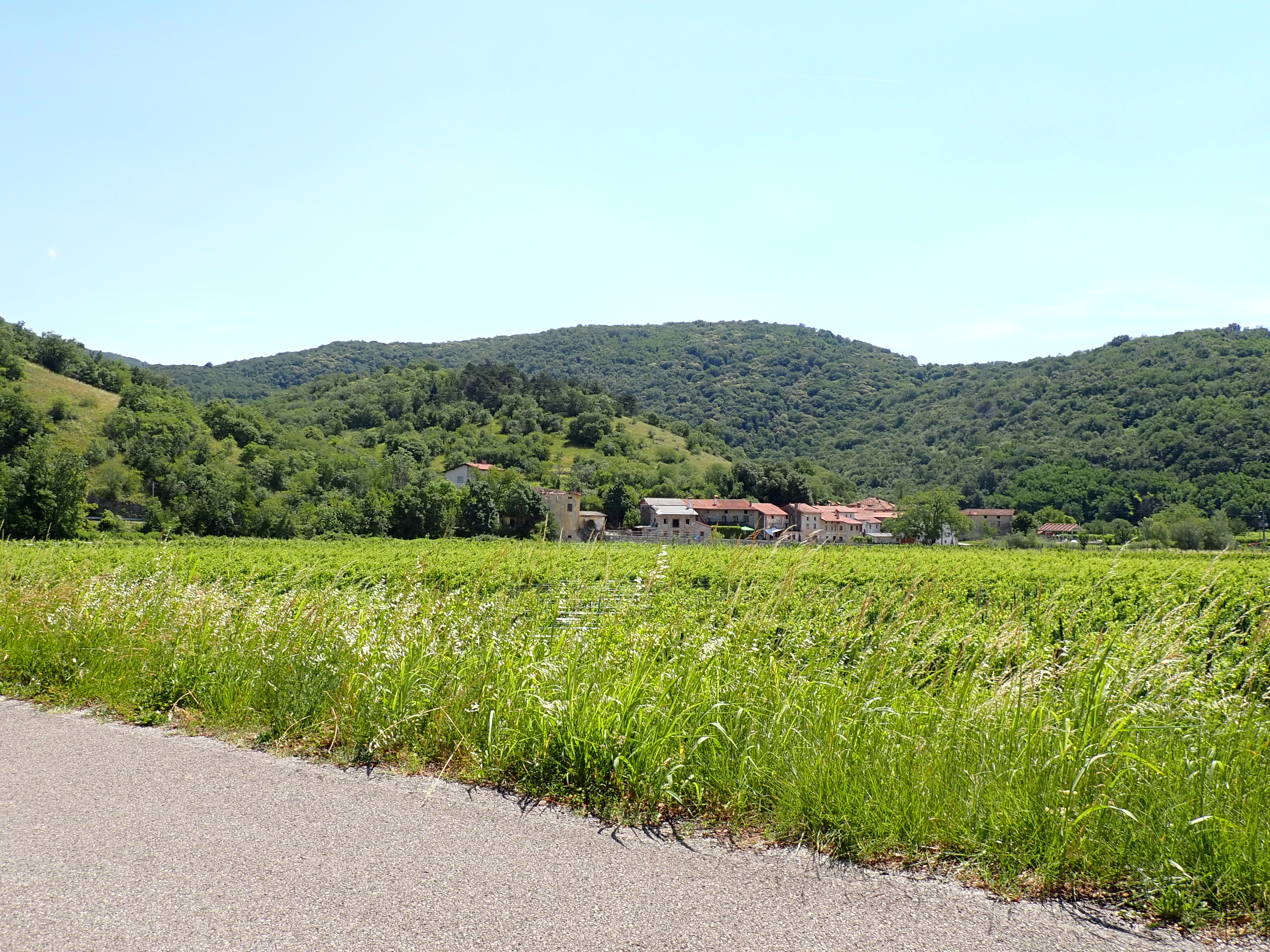
- Golo Brdo, viewed from the Italian side of the border

- Location in Slovenia
- Coordinates: 46°3′23.68″N 13°29′59.67″E
- Country: Slovenia
- Traditional region: Slovenian Littoral
- Statistical region: Gorizia
- Municipality: Brda

Area
  - Total: 1.07 km^{2} (0.41 sq mi)
- Elevation: 132.6 m (435 ft)

Population (2020)
  - Total: 24
  - Density: 22/km^{2} (58/sq mi)

Golo Brdo (pronounced [ˈɡɔːlɔ ˈbəɾdɔ]) is a small village in the Municipality of Brda in the Littoral region of Slovenia, right on the border with Italy.

== Church ==
The local church, dedicated to Mary on the Lake (Sveta Marija na jezeru), was built on a small hill outside the village. The reference to a lake is due to subterranean water below the church. The church belongs to the Parish of Kožbana.
