= Vedrijan =

- Village
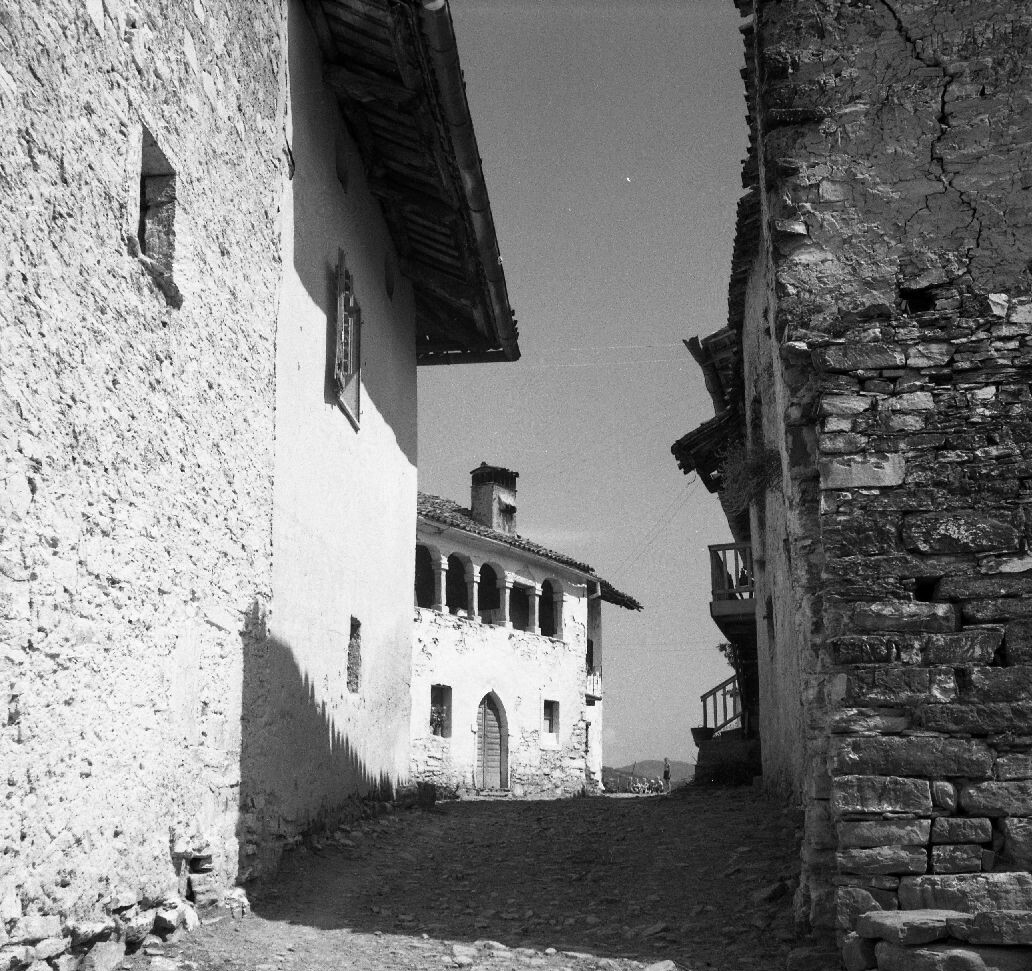
- Vedrijan in 1953

- Location in Slovenia
- Coordinates: 46°0′52.78″N 13°32′32.99″E
- Country: Slovenia
- Traditional region: Slovenian Littoral
- Statistical region: Gorizia
- Municipality: Brda

Area
  - Total: 1.78 km^{2} (0.69 sq mi)
- Elevation: 247.6 m (812 ft)

Population (2020)
  - Total: 177
  - Density: 99.4/km^{2} (258/sq mi)

Vedrijan (pronounced [ʋɛdɾiˈjaːn]) is a village in the Municipality of Brda in the Littoral region of Slovenia.

The parish church is dedicated to Saint Vitus and belongs to the Koper Diocese.
