= Ivanka Veronika Reja =

Slovenian teacher, headmistress, and superior general (1904–1994)

- Born: Veronika Ivanka Reja; 27 January 1904; Kozana, Brda, Slovenia (then Austria-Hungary)
- Died: 1 October 1994 (aged 90); Rome, Italy
- Occupations: teacher, head teacher, Superior General
- Known for: Serving as Superior General of the Sisters of Charity of Our Lady of Good and Perpetual Help between years 1963 and 1982

Ivanka Veronika Reja (27 January 1904 – 1 October 1994), known as sister Maria Juana, was a Slovenian teacher and headmistress. She worked in Argentina and Italy. She served as superior general of the Sisters of Charity of Our Lady of Good and Perpetual Help between years 1963 and 1982.

== Early life ==
Ivanka Veronika was born on 27 January 1904 in Kozana into a Catholic family. Her mother was the farmer Marija Ferri (1864 – c. 1914) and her father was the farmer Karlo Reja (1858–1916).

Her mother died before the First World War. During the war, the family took refuge in Piedmont, Italy. Her father found work in Biella, and the children were sheltered at the Sanctuary of Oropa. Her father died in 1916.Ivanka Veronika attended primary school in Oropa and later secondary school in Biella.

== Career ==
In 1925, Ivanka Veronika emigrated to Argentina with her brother Henrik Reja. On 7 December 1930, in Buenos Aires, she entered the Sisters of Charity of Our Lady of Good and Perpetual Help (Congregatio Sororum Caritatis Beatae Mariae Virginis miraculis illustris). She made temporary vows in 1932. She became a teacher at the congregation’s orphanage school. She made perpetual vows in 1935.

In 1938 she became the headmistress of the congregation’s orphanage school. From 1940 she also served as teacher of novice nuns. She served as provincial superior for Argentina from 1947, and again as teacher of novices from 1954. In 1956 she was called to Rome as a counsellor to the superior general, and in 1957 she was appointed superior of a community in Rome.

In 1963 Ivanka Veronika became provincial superior for the Italian province. She was elected superior general of the congregation in 1965 and re-elected in 1971 and 1975. She resigned the office in 1982 due to age.

== Later life and death ==
After 1982 Ivanka Veronika continued to serve for several years as Vicar General and as a local superior. In her final years she spent hours every day in the convent chapel in prayer for peace and her homeland. She died in Rome on 1 October 1994.
