= Hlevnik =

Village in western Slovenia

- Location in Slovenia
- Coordinates: 46°1′41.5″N 13°30′37.78″E
- Country: Slovenia
- Traditional region: Slovenian Littoral
- Statistical region: Gorizia
- Municipality: Brda

Area
  - Total: 0.79 km^{2} (0.31 sq mi)
- Elevation: 170.7 m (560 ft)

Population (2020)
  - Total: 34
  - Density: 43/km^{2} (110/sq mi)

Hlevnik (pronounced [ˈxleːu̯nik]) is a small village in the Municipality of Brda in the Littoral region of Slovenia, on the border with Italy.
