= Imenje, Brda =

Imenje
- Village
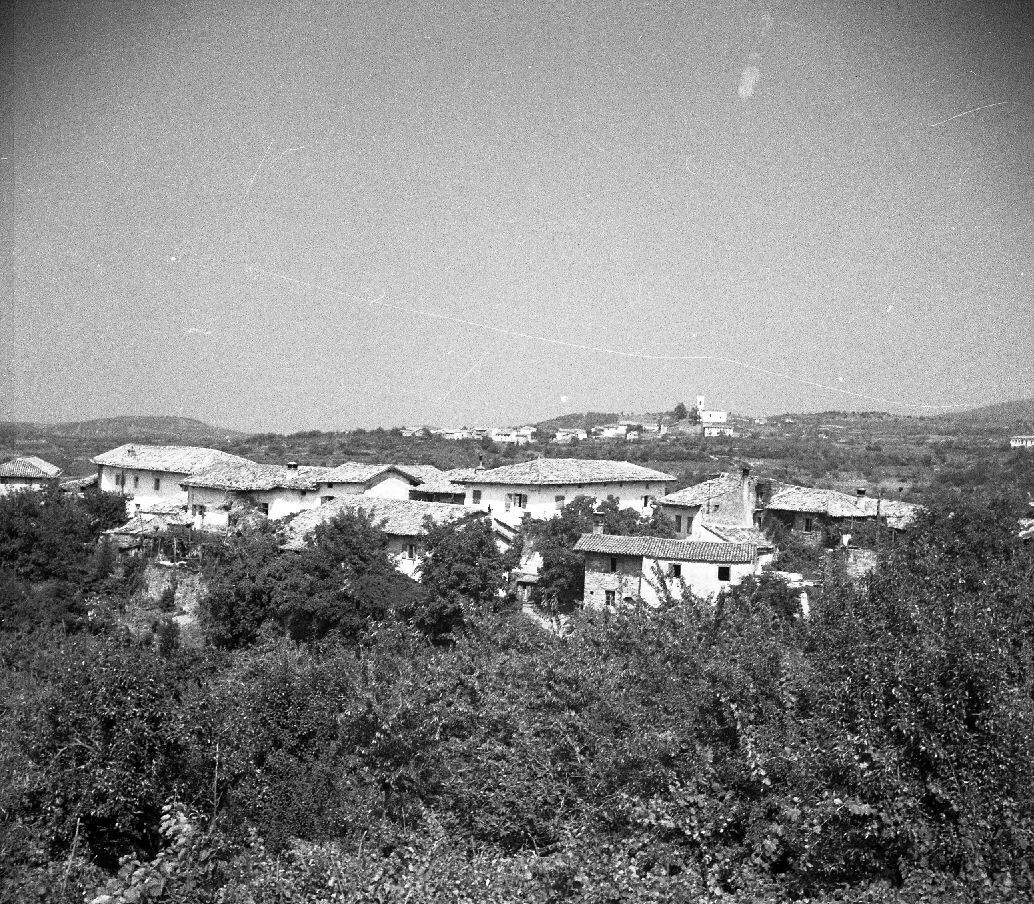
- Imenje in 1953

- Location in Slovenia
- Coordinates: 46°0′33.4″N 13°33′3.25″E
- Country: Slovenia
- Traditional region: Slovenian Littoral
- Statistical region: Gorizia
- Municipality: Brda

Area
  - Total: 0.8 km^{2} (0.31 sq mi)
- Elevation: 239 m (784 ft)

Population (2020)
  - Total: 131
  - Density: 160/km^{2} (420/sq mi)

Imenje (pronounced [iˈmeːnjɛ]) is a village in the Municipality of Brda in the Littoral region of Slovenia.
