= Pristavo =

- Location in Slovenia
- Coordinates: 46°1′39.25″N 13°31′4.34″E
- Country: Slovenia
- Traditional region: Slovenian Littoral
- Statistical region: Gorizia
- Municipality: Brda

Area
  - Total: 0.31 km^{2} (0.12 sq mi)
- Elevation: 146.6 m (481 ft)

Population (2020)
  - Total: 11
  - Density: 35/km^{2} (92/sq mi)

Pristavo (pronounced [pɾiˈstaːʋɔ]) is a small settlement in the Municipality of Brda in the Littoral region of Slovenia, close to the border with Italy.
