= Slavče, Brda =

Slavče
- Location in Slovenia
- Coordinates: 46°1′15.65″N 13°31′7.3″E
- Country: Slovenia
- Traditional region: Slovenian Littoral
- Statistical region: Gorizia
- Municipality: Brda

Area
  - Total: 1.2 km^{2} (0.46 sq mi)
- Elevation: 180.5 m (592 ft)

Population (2020)
  - Total: 29
  - Density: 24/km^{2} (63/sq mi)

Slavče (pronounced [ˈslaːu̯tʃɛ]) is a small settlement in the Municipality of Brda in the Littoral region of Slovenia close to the border with Italy.
