= Vipolže =

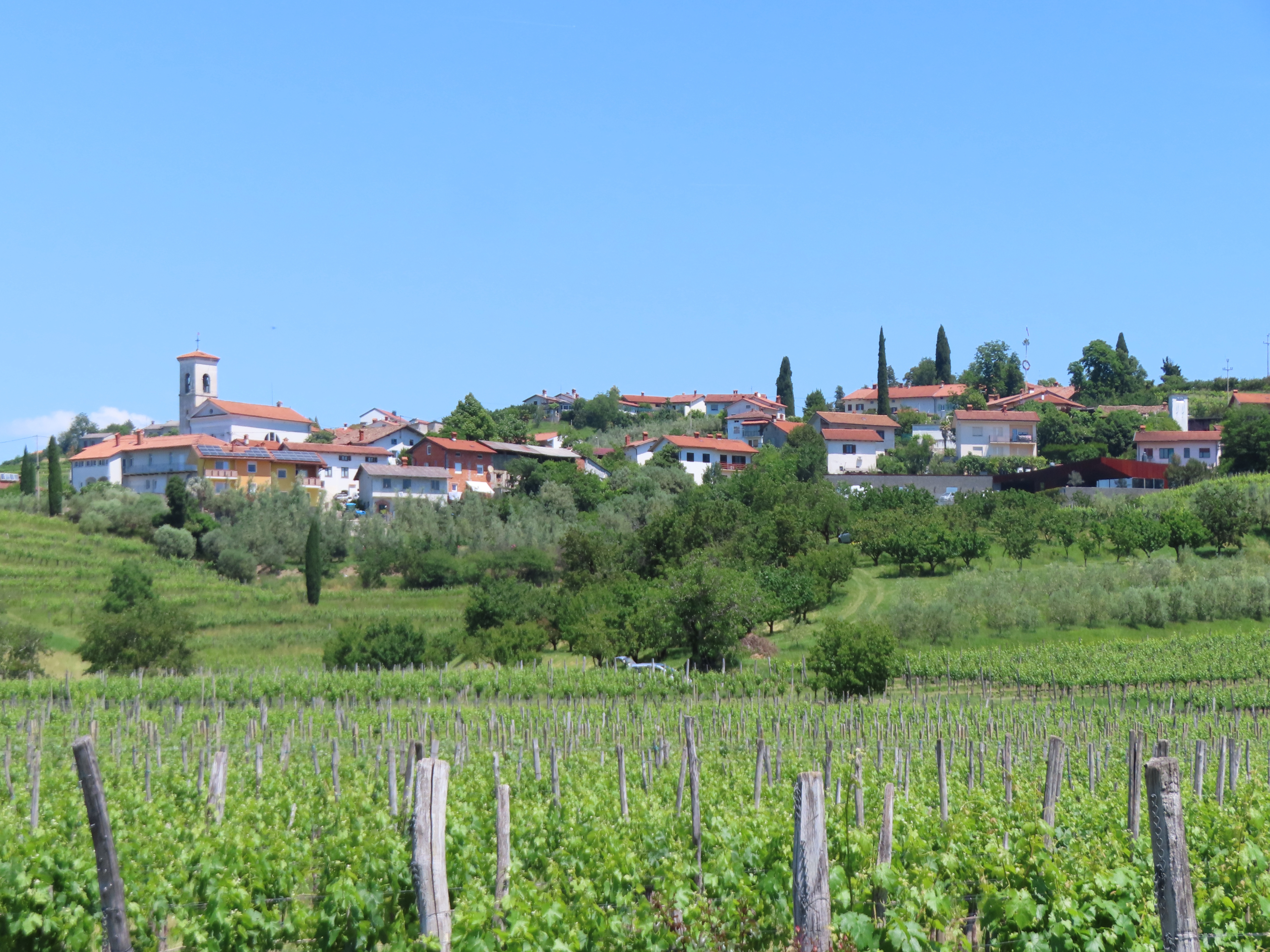

- Location in Slovenia
- Coordinates: 45°58′34.54″N 13°32′13.85″E
- Country: Slovenia
- Traditional region: Slovenian Littoral
- Statistical region: Gorizia
- Municipality: Brda

Area
  - Total: 2.23 km^{2} (0.86 sq mi)
- Elevation: 126.7 m (416 ft)

Population (2020)
  - Total: 428
  - Density: 192/km^{2} (497/sq mi)

Vipolže (pronounced [ˈʋiːpɔu̯ʒɛ]) is a scattered village in the southern part of the Municipality of Brda in the Littoral region of Slovenia on the border with Italy.

The parish church in the settlement is dedicated to Saint Giles and belongs to the Koper Diocese.

== Vipolže Castle ==
The 11th-century castle was converted into a Venetian-style villa in the 17th century. It was damaged in a fire on 10 November 1948, allegedly set by members of a counter-revolutionary group known as the Slovenian Army of the Royal Yugoslav Armed Forces (Slovene: Slovenska armija Kraljeve Jugoslovanske vojske) or the Matjaž Army (Slovene: Matjaževa vojska), dedicated to destroying state-owned property. The fire destroyed the roof of the castle and 40,000 kg of hay stored inside it. The alleged ringleader Darko Toroš and his accomplices were arrested along with eight uninvolved persons; Toroš was shot and buried in an unknown location, and the others were sentenced to lengthy prison terms with hard labor.
