= Municipality of Brda =

Municipality of Slovenia

Municipality of Brda Občina Brda
- Municipality
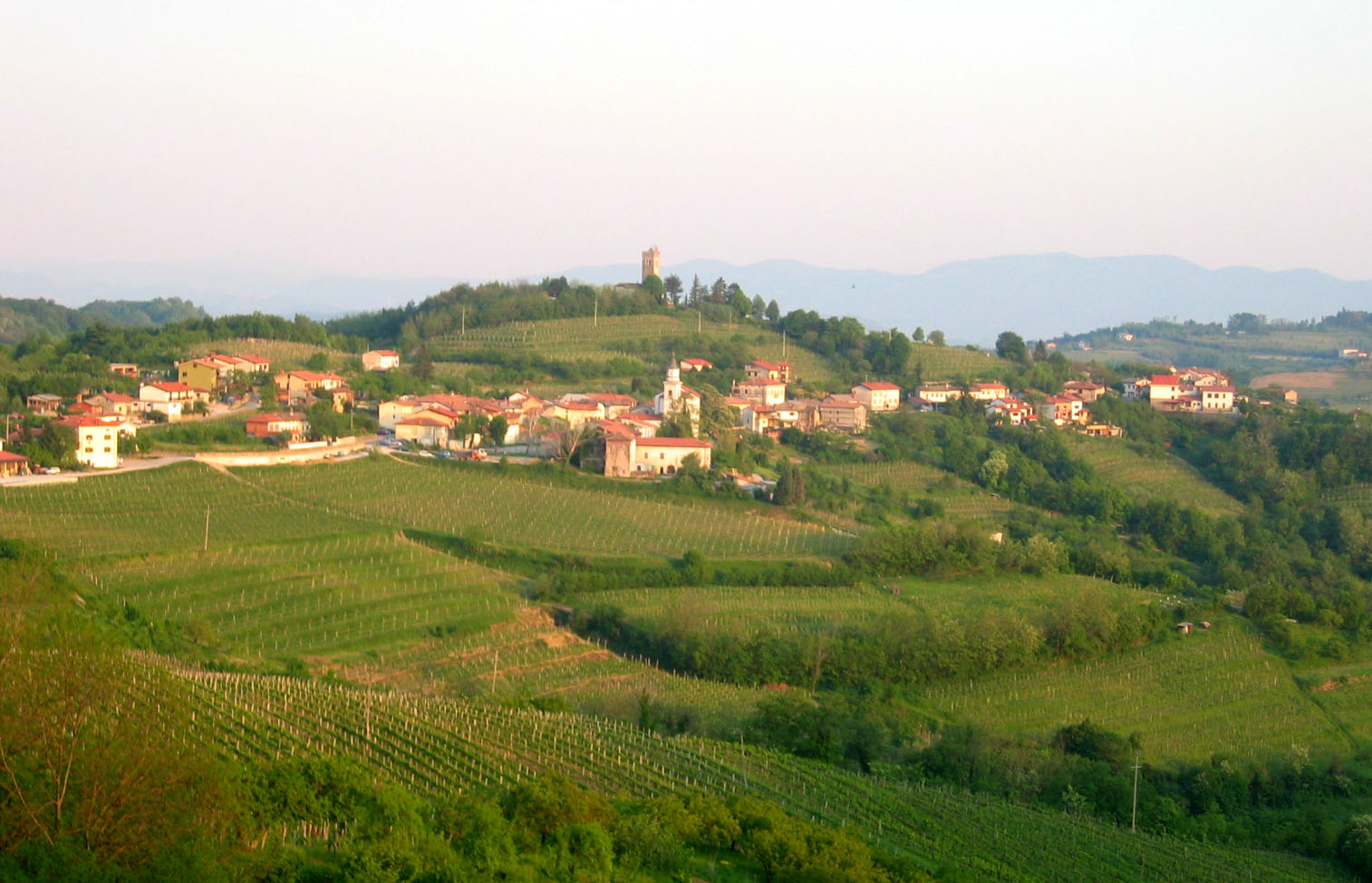
- The village of Hum in the municipality

- Location of the Municipality of Brda in Slovenia
- Coordinates: 45°59′52″N 13°31′43″E
- Country: Slovenia

Government
  - Mayor: Franc Mužič (LDS)

Area
  - Total: 72 km^{2} (28 sq mi)

Population (2010)
  - Total: 5,757
  - Density: 80/km^{2} (210/sq mi)
- Time zone: UTC+01 (CET)
  - Summer (DST): UTC+02 (CEST)
- Website: www.obcina-brda.si

The Municipality of Brda (pronounced [ˈbəɾda]; Slovene: Občina Brda, Italian: Comune di Collio) is a municipality in western Slovenia. It is located in the Slovenian Littoral region, extending from the Italian border to the Soča River. It is bounded by Sabotin Hill (609 meters or 1,998 feet) to the east and Korada Hill (812 meters or 2,664 feet) to the north.

The people speak a distinctive Slovene dialect belonging to the Littoral dialect group.

== Geography ==
The municipality comprises the Slovenian part of the Gorizia Hills (Slovene: Goriška brda, Italian: Collio Goriziano), which are one of the most important wine-producing microregions in Slovenia. It enjoys a mild Mediterranean climate and it is protected from the strong Bora wind, which frequently blows in other parts of the Slovenian Littoral.

=== Settlements ===
In addition to the municipal seat of Dobrovo, the municipality also includes the following settlements:

- Barbana
- Belo
- Biljana
- Brdice pri Kožbani
- Brdice pri Neblem
- Breg pri Golem Brdu
- Brestje
- Brezovk
- Ceglo
- Dolnje Cerovo
- Drnovk
- Fojana
- Golo Brdo
- Gonjače
- Gornje Cerovo
- Gradno
- Hlevnik
- Hruševlje
- Hum
- Imenje
- Kojsko
- Kozana
- Kozarno
- Kožbana
- Krasno
- Medana
- Neblo
- Nozno
- Plešivo
- Podsabotin
- Pristavo
- Senik
- Slapnik
- Slavče
- Šlovrenc
- Šmartno
- Snežatno
- Snežeče
- Vedrijan
- Vipolže
- Višnjevik
- Vrhovlje pri Kojskem
- Vrhovlje pri Kožbani
- Zali Breg

== Economy ==
Agriculture is an important part of the local economy: besides grapes, cherries are the most important agricultural product in the municipality, followed by apricots, pears, figs, and plums. Together with the Vipava Valley, Brda produces most of the persimmons in Slovenia. Small amounts of olive oil are also produced.

The wine varieties grown in Brda include Merlot, Cabernet Sauvignon, Pinot noir, Pinot gris, and Sauvignon vert.

== Notable people ==
Brda is the native land of the poet Alojz Gradnik, who was born in the village of Medana.

== In popular culture ==
The Slovenian sitcom Ena žlahtna štorija is set in Brda.

== See also ==
- Slovenian wine
- Collio Goriziano
