= Višnjevik =

- Location in Slovenia
- Coordinates: 46°1′13.31″N 13°31′52.46″E
- Country: Slovenia
- Traditional region: Slovenian Littoral
- Statistical region: Gorizia
- Municipality: Brda

Area
  - Total: 1.39 km^{2} (0.54 sq mi)
- Elevation: 237.2 m (778 ft)

Population (2020)
  - Total: 152
  - Density: 109/km^{2} (283/sq mi)

Višnjevik (pronounced [ˈʋiːʃnjɛʋik]) is a settlement in the Municipality of Brda in the Littoral region of Slovenia.
