= Podsabotin =

- Location in Slovenia
- Coordinates: 45°59′17.92″N 13°36′31.07″E
- Country: Slovenia
- Traditional region: Slovenian Littoral
- Statistical region: Gorizia
- Municipality: Brda

Area
  - Total: 5.55 km^{2} (2.14 sq mi)
- Elevation: 136.2 m (447 ft)

Population (2020)
  - Total: 306
  - Density: 55.1/km^{2} (143/sq mi)

Podsabotin (pronounced [pɔtsabɔˈtiːn], Italian: Poggio San Valentino) is a village in the Municipality of Brda in the Littoral region of Slovenia, right on the border with Italy.

The parish church in the settlement is dedicated to Saint Nicholas and belongs to the Koper Diocese. Another small church belonging to the same parish is built in the hamlet of Podsenica and is dedicated to Saint Lawrence.
