= Slapnik, Brda =

Slapnik
- Location in Slovenia
- Coordinates: 46°2′36.89″N 13°33′9.33″E
- Country: Slovenia
- Traditional region: Slovenian Littoral
- Statistical region: Gorizia
- Municipality: Brda

Area
  - Total: 1.6 km^{2} (0.62 sq mi)
- Elevation: 359.7 m (1,180 ft)

Population (2020)
  - Total: 0
  - Density: 0.0/km^{2} (0.0/sq mi)

Slapnik (pronounced [slaˈpniːk]) is a small isolated settlement in the Municipality of Brda in the Littoral region of Slovenia. It has no permanent residents.
