= Neblo =

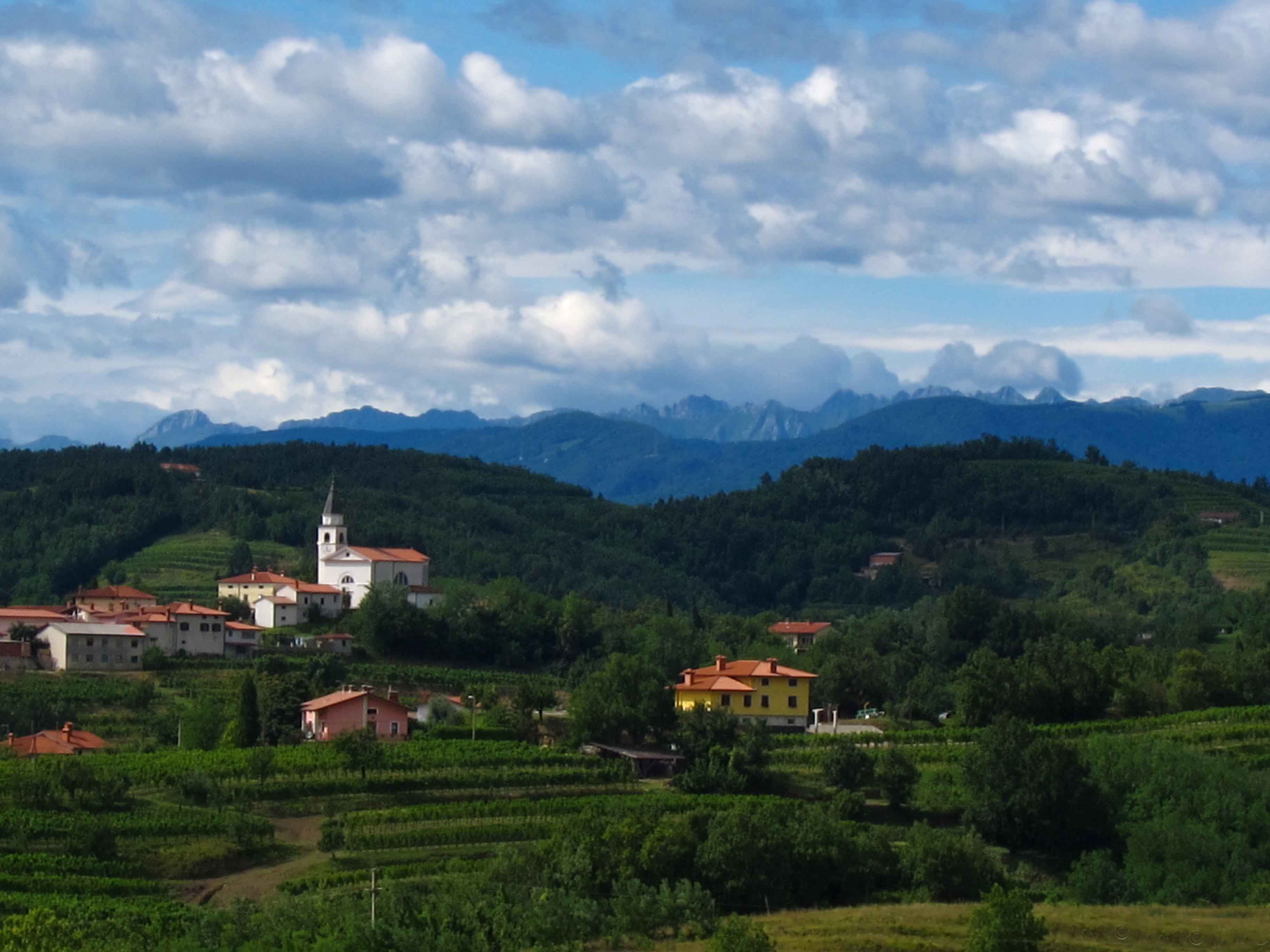

- Location in Slovenia
- Coordinates: 46°0′19.97″N 13°29′55.8″E
- Country: Slovenia
- Traditional region: Slovenian Littoral
- Statistical region: Gorizia
- Municipality: Brda

Area
  - Total: 2.46 km^{2} (0.95 sq mi)
- Elevation: 130.5 m (428 ft)

Population (2020)
  - Total: 197
  - Density: 80.1/km^{2} (207/sq mi)

Neblo (pronounced [ˈneːblɔ]) is a village in the Municipality of Brda in the Littoral region of Slovenia on the border with Italy.

The local church is dedicated to Saint Nicholas and belongs to the Parish of Šlovrenc.
