= Biljana =

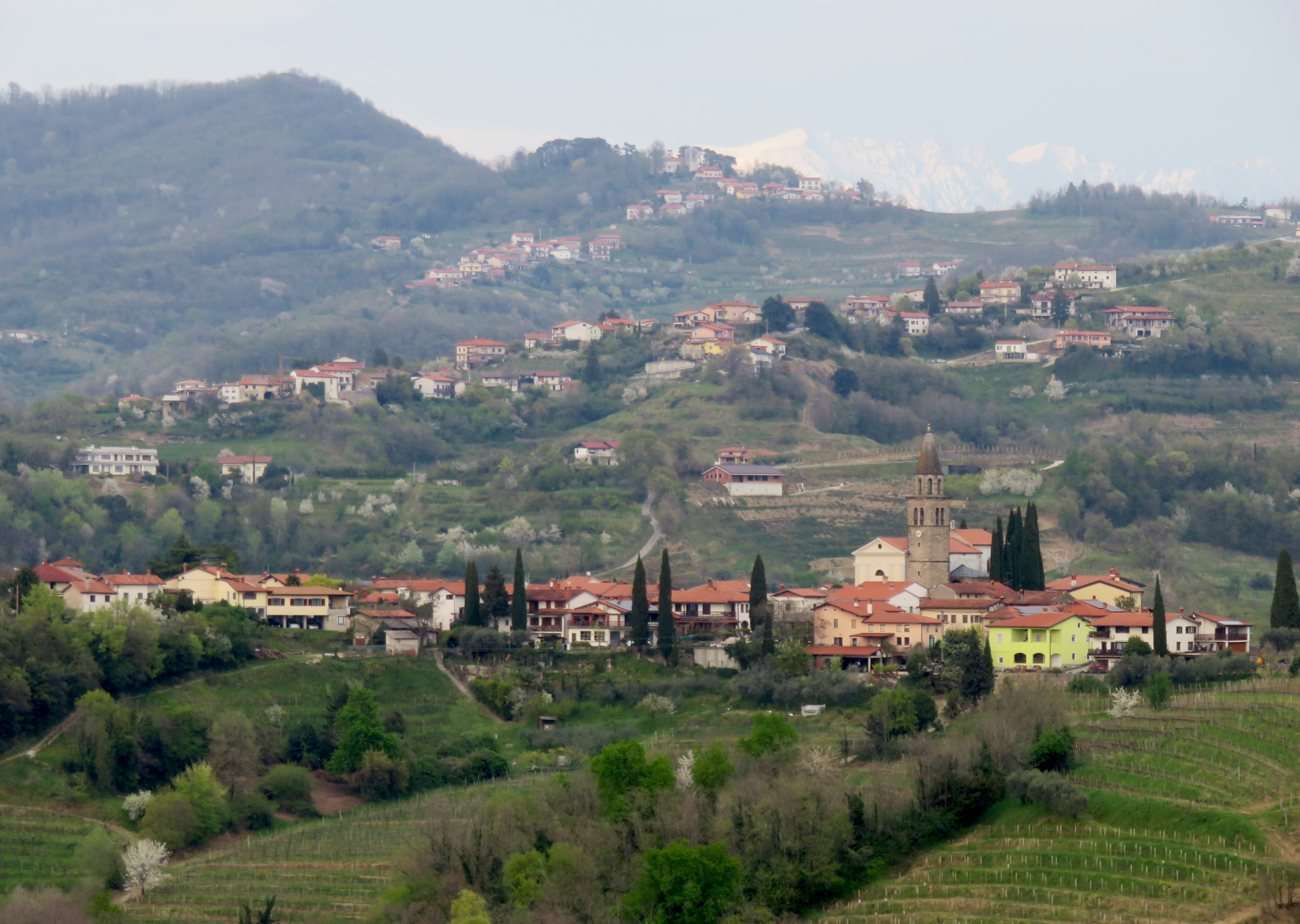

- Location in Slovenia
- Coordinates: 45°59′50.89″N 13°32′6.72″E
- Country: Slovenia
- Traditional region: Slovenian Littoral
- Statistical region: Gorizia
- Municipality: Brda

Area
  - Total: 1.46 km^{2} (0.56 sq mi)
- Elevation: 165.4 m (543 ft)

Population (2020)
  - Total: 148
  - Density: 101/km^{2} (263/sq mi)

Biljana (pronounced [biˈljaːna]) is a settlement east of Dobrovo in the Municipality of Brda in the Littoral region of Slovenia, very close to the border with Italy.

== Name ==
Biljana was first mentioned in written sources in 1205 as Beliana (and as Villana in 1233, Billgianis in 1270, and Bigliana in 1480). The oldest attestations indicate that the name was originally *Běľana, with the later development of unstressed -ě- > -i-. The suffix -ana generally indicates a Romance or pre-Romance origin, but because the name cannot be explained through Romance roots it is assumed that it is Slavic in origin, possibly derived from the plural demonym *Běľane (literally, 'residents of *Belъjь's village').

== History ==
The lords of Biljana lived in a building known as Dorišče in the 13th and 14th centuries. Ownership of the building changed frequently over the centuries. During the late 19th century, the national revival movement took hold here; the Lipa Reading and Choral Society in Biljana was the largest in the Gorizia Hills. Before the First World War, an Austrian military unit was stationed in the village.

== Church ==
The parish church in the village is dedicated to Saint Michael and belongs to the Diocese of Koper. The earliest church at the site dated to the 13th century. The current church has a Gothic belfry and a distinctive chancel with a wooden statue from the end of the 15th century. The church contains a painting by Avgust Schlegl (1856–1908).

== Notable people ==
Notable people that were born or lived in Biljana include:

- Ignac Kožlin (1878–1955), composer
- Lojze Simoniti (1901–1957), physician
