= Medana =

- Village
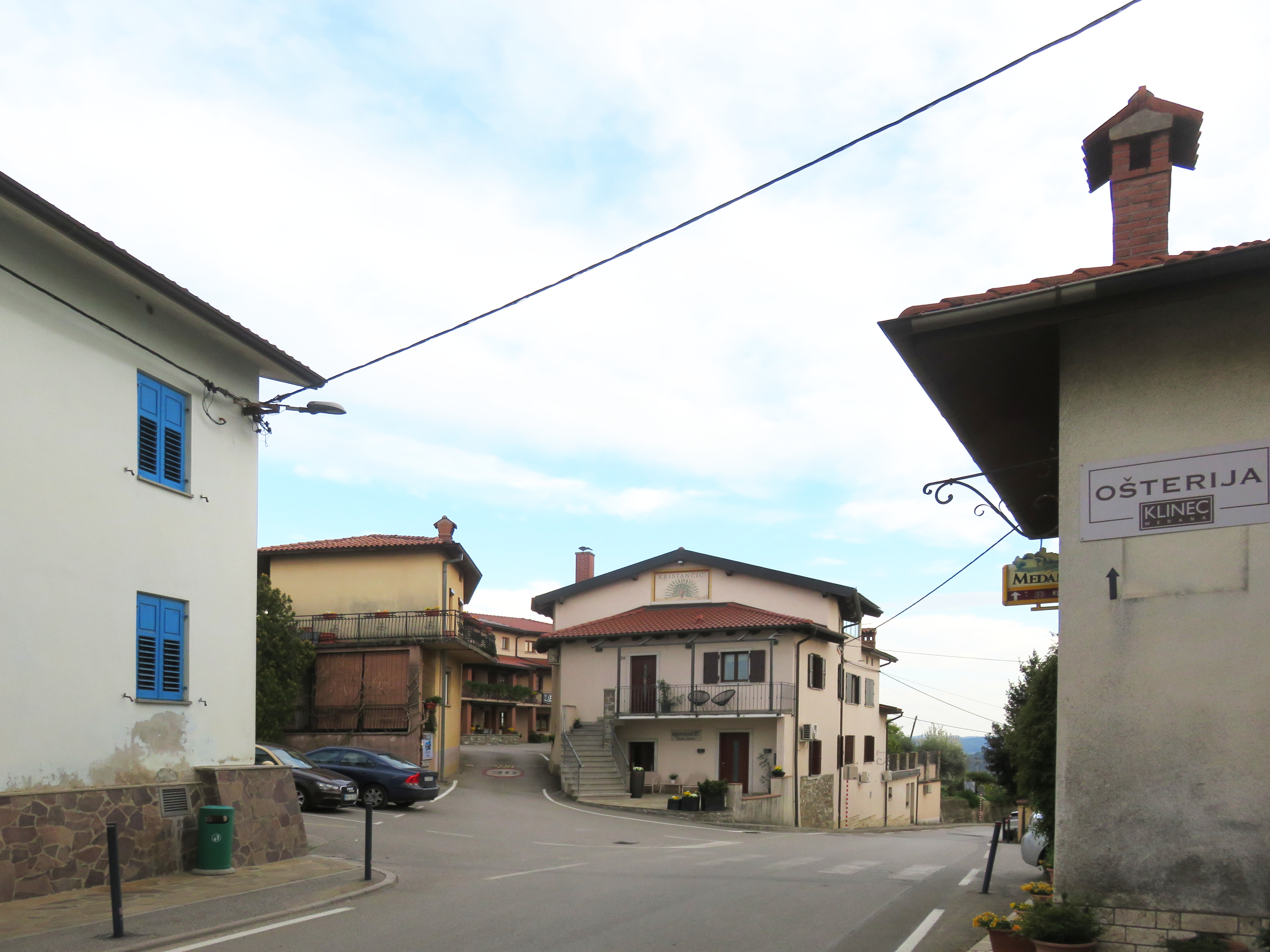

- Location in Slovenia
- Coordinates: 45°59′6.53″N 13°31′17.24″E
- Country: Slovenia
- Traditional region: Slovenian Littoral
- Statistical region: Gorizia
- Municipality: Brda

Area
  - Total: 1.3 km^{2} (0.50 sq mi)
- Elevation: 184.4 m (605 ft)

Population (2020)
  - Total: 211
  - Density: 160/km^{2} (420/sq mi)

Medana (pronounced [mɛˈdaːna]) is a village in the Municipality of Brda in the Slovene Littoral region of Slovenia. It is located in the Gorizia Hills (Slovene: Goriška brda), a wine-producing region on the border with Italy. The parish church in the village is dedicated to the Assumption of Mary and belongs to the Diocese of Koper. Medana is the birthplace of the Slovene poet Alojz Gradnik and is known for its annual Poetry and Wine Days festival, which takes place in late August.
