= Kozana =

Village in western Slovenia

- Village
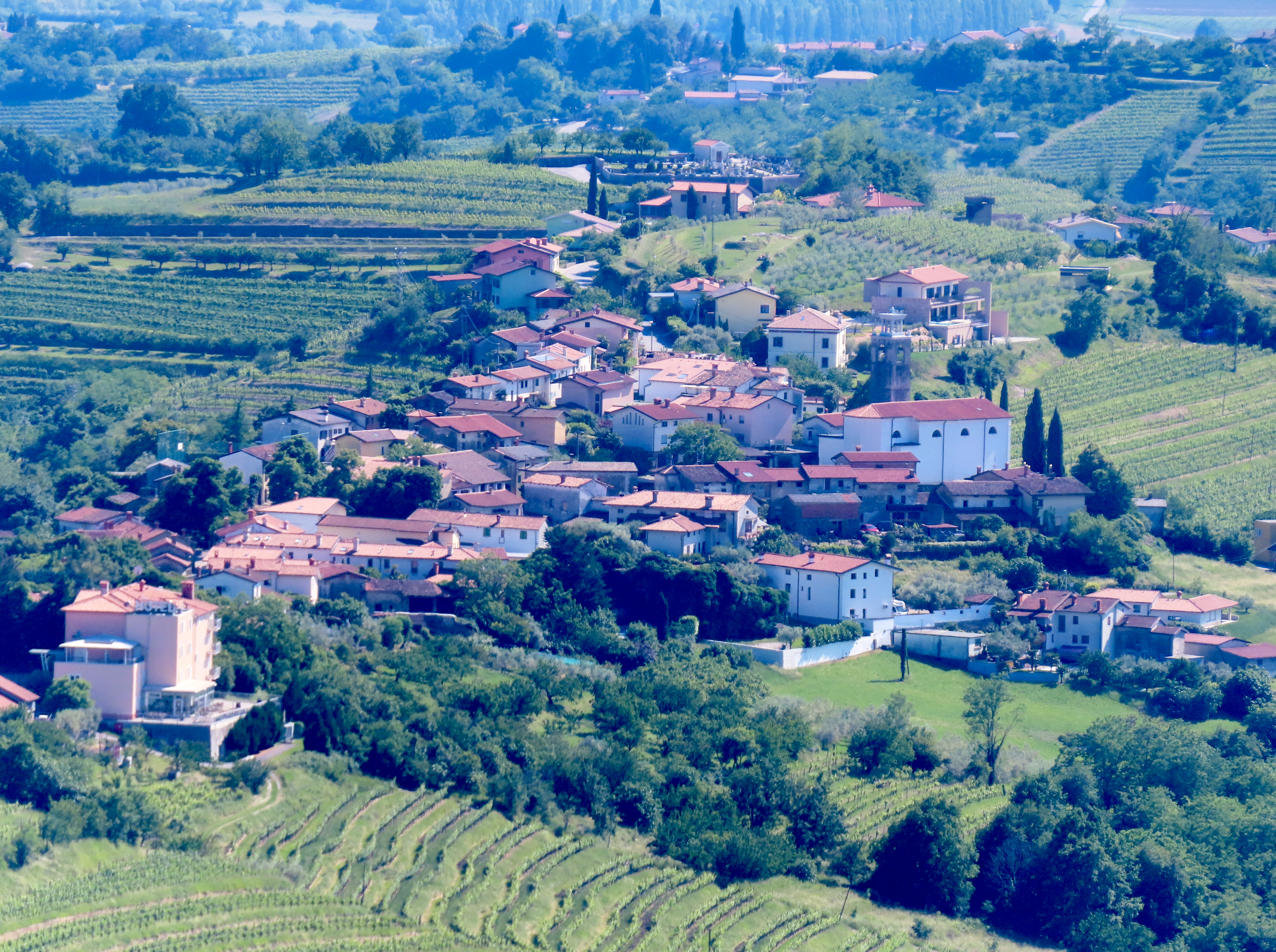

- Location in Slovenia
- Coordinates: 45°59′36.05″N 13°33′1.95″E
- Country: Slovenia
- Traditional region: Slovenian Littoral
- Statistical region: Gorizia
- Municipality: Brda

Area
  - Total: 3.69 km^{2} (1.42 sq mi)
- Elevation: 163.6 m (537 ft)

Population (2020)
  - Total: 365
  - Density: 98.9/km^{2} (256/sq mi)

Kozana (pronounced [kɔˈzaːna]) is a village in the Municipality of Brda in the Littoral region of Slovenia.

The parish church in the village is dedicated to Saint Jerome and belongs to the Koper Diocese.

== Notable people ==
Notable people that were born or lived in Kozana include the following:

- Ivanka Veronika Reja (1904–1994), Slovenian teacher and superior general of the Sisters of Charity of Good and Perpetual Succour
