= Gornje Cerovo =

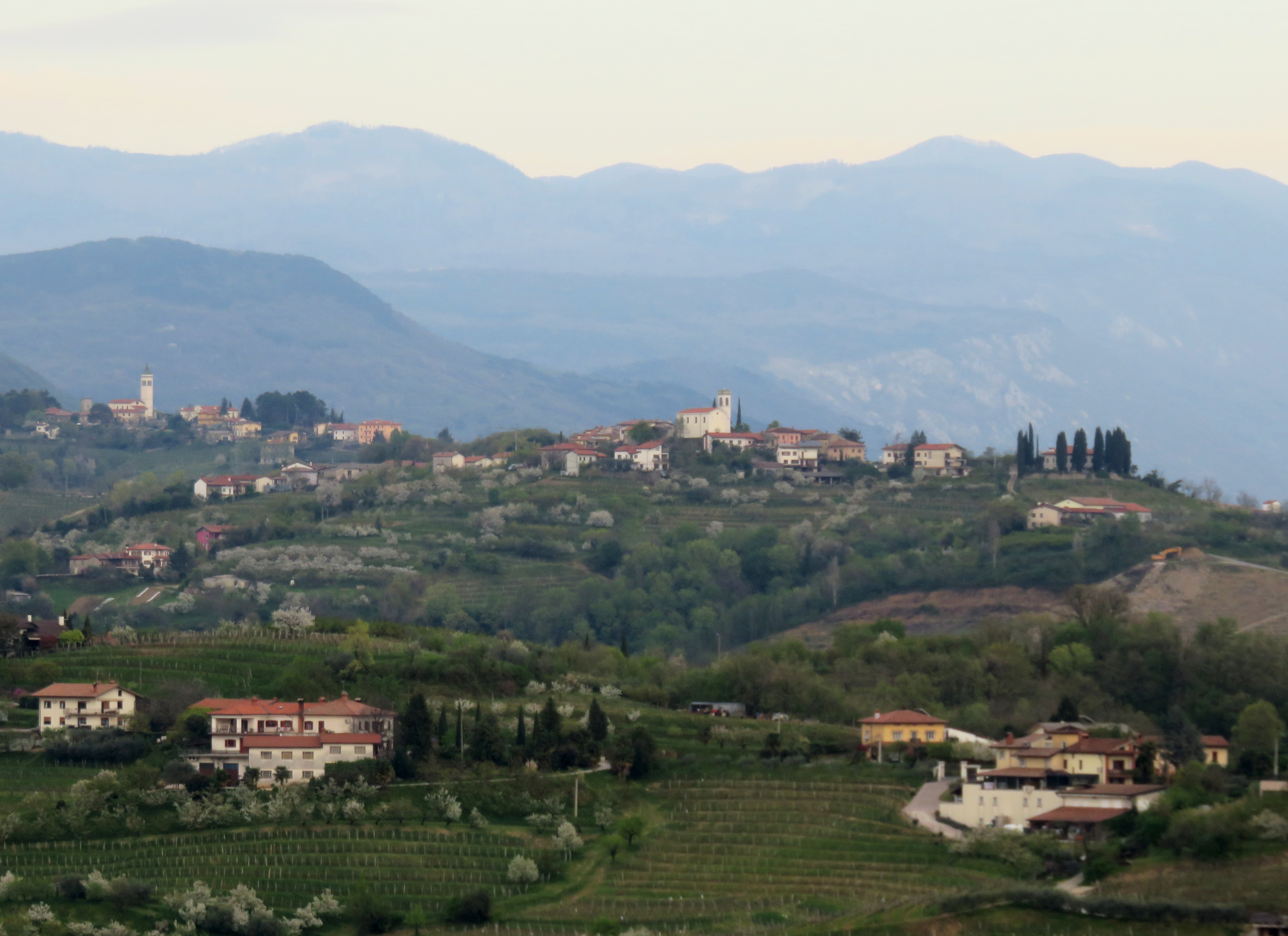

- Location in Slovenia
- Coordinates: 45°58′56.15″N 13°33′48.99″E
- Country: Slovenia
- Traditional region: Slovenian Littoral
- Statistical region: Gorizia
- Municipality: Brda

Area
  - Total: 2.93 km^{2} (1.13 sq mi)
- Elevation: 228.9 m (751 ft)

Population (2020)
  - Total: 337
  - Density: 115/km^{2} (298/sq mi)

Gornje Cerovo (pronounced [ˈɡoːɾnjɛ tsɛˈɾɔːʋɔ] or [ˈɡoːɾnjɛ tsɛˈɾoːʋɔ]) is a village in the Municipality of Brda in the Littoral region of Slovenia, right on the border with Italy.

The Cerovo parish church in the settlement is dedicated to Saint Nicholas and belongs to the Diocese of Koper.
