= Barbana, Brda =

Barbana
- Location in Slovenia
- Coordinates: 45°59′32.24″N 13°29′46.87″E
- Country: Slovenia
- Traditional region: Slovenian Littoral
- Statistical region: Gorizia
- Municipality: Brda

Area
  - Total: 1.2 km^{2} (0.46 sq mi)
- Elevation: 151.6 m (497 ft)

Population (2020)
  - Total: 58
  - Density: 48/km^{2} (130/sq mi)

Barbana (pronounced [baɾˈbaːna]) is a small settlement in the Municipality of Brda in the Littoral region of Slovenia, on the border with Italy.
