= Šmartno, Brda =

Place in Slovenian Littoral, Slovenia

Šmartno
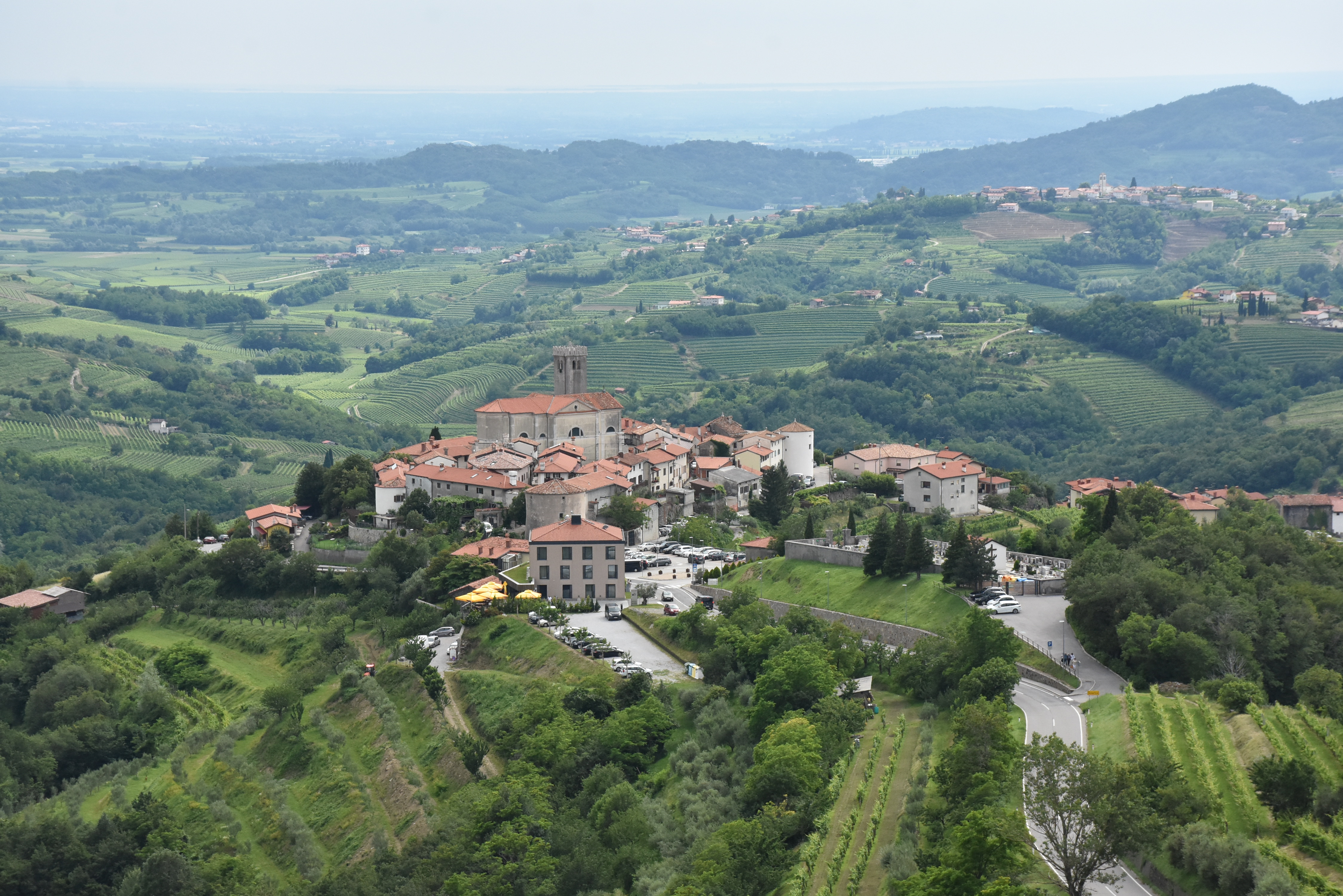

- Location in Slovenia
- Coordinates: 46°0′20.36″N 13°33′22.18″E
- Country: Slovenia
- Traditional region: Slovenian Littoral
- Statistical region: Gorizia
- Municipality: Brda

Area
  - Total: 1.42 km^{2} (0.55 sq mi)
- Elevation: 259.1 m (850 ft)

Population (2020)
  - Total: 198
  - Density: 139/km^{2} (361/sq mi)

Šmartno (pronounced [ˈʃmaːɾtnɔ]; Italian: San Martino del Collio or San Martino di Quisca) is a village in the Municipality of Brda in the Littoral region of Slovenia. The entire village has been declared a cultural heritage monument.

The village is located in the geographical center of the Gorizia Hills, on a hill and surrounded by defensive walls. Its history dates back to Roman times, and the village was first mentioned as Sanctus Martinus in 1317.

The parish church, from which the settlement also gets its name, is dedicated to Saint Martin and belongs to the Koper Diocese.
