= Šlovrenc =

- Location in Slovenia
- Coordinates: 46°0′41.21″N 13°30′52.88″E
- Country: Slovenia
- Traditional region: Slovenian Littoral
- Statistical region: Gorizia
- Municipality: Brda

Area
  - Total: 1.11 km^{2} (0.43 sq mi)
- Elevation: 145.8 m (478 ft)

Population (2020)
  - Total: 102
  - Density: 91.9/km^{2} (238/sq mi)

Šlovrenc (pronounced [ˈʃloːu̯ɾɛnts]) is a village in the Municipality of Brda in the Littoral region of Slovenia, close to the border with Italy.

The parish church, from which the settlement also gets its name, is dedicated to Saint Lawrence and belongs to the Koper Diocese.
