= Hum, Brda =

Hum
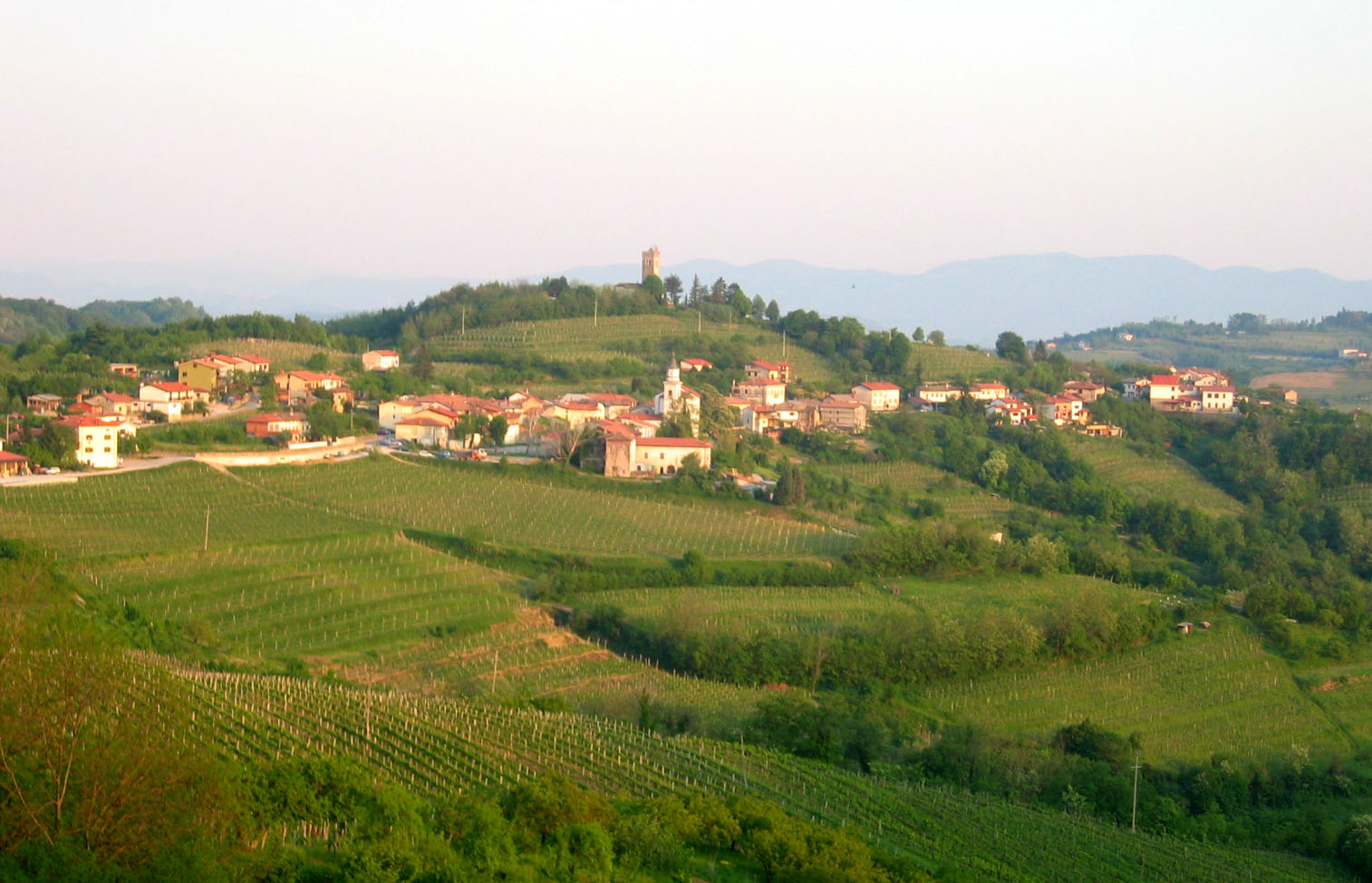

- Location in Slovenia
- Coordinates: 45°59′42.33″N 13°34′55.19″E
- Country: Slovenia
- Traditional region: Slovenian Littoral
- Statistical region: Gorizia
- Municipality: Brda

Area
  - Total: 2.86 km^{2} (1.10 sq mi)
- Elevation: 196.8 m (646 ft)

Population (2020)
  - Total: 317
  - Density: 111/km^{2} (287/sq mi)

Hum (pronounced [ˈxuːm]) is a settlement in the Municipality of Brda in the Littoral region of Slovenia, on the border with Italy.
