= Gradno =

Gradno Grabno (until 1952)
- Location in Slovenia
- Coordinates: 46°1′16.92″N 13°31′30.51″E
- Country: Slovenia
- Traditional region: Slovenian Littoral
- Statistical region: Gorizia
- Municipality: Brda

Area
  - Total: 0.56 km^{2} (0.22 sq mi)
- Elevation: 200.3 m (657 ft)

Population (2020)
  - Total: 39
  - Density: 70/km^{2} (180/sq mi)

Gradno (pronounced [ˈɡɾaːdnɔ]) is a small village in the Municipality of Brda in the Littoral region of Slovenia.

== Name ==
The name of the settlement was changed from Grabno to Gradno in 1952.

== Church ==
The parish church in the settlement is dedicated to Saint George and belongs to the Diocese of Koper.
