= Kožbana =

- Location in Slovenia
- Coordinates: 46°2′36.87″N 13°31′51.65″E
- Country: Slovenia
- Traditional region: Slovenian Littoral
- Statistical region: Gorizia
- Municipality: Brda

Area
  - Total: 0.81 km^{2} (0.31 sq mi)
- Elevation: 295.7 m (970 ft)

Population (2020)
  - Total: 36
  - Density: 44/km^{2} (120/sq mi)

Kožbana (pronounced [kɔˈʒbaːna]) is a village in the Municipality of Brda in the Littoral region of Slovenia, located in the Gorizia Hills (Slovene: Goriška brda), a wine-producing region close to the border with Italy.

The parish church in the settlement is dedicated to Saint George and belongs to the Koper Diocese.
