= Kojsko =

Village in western Slovenia

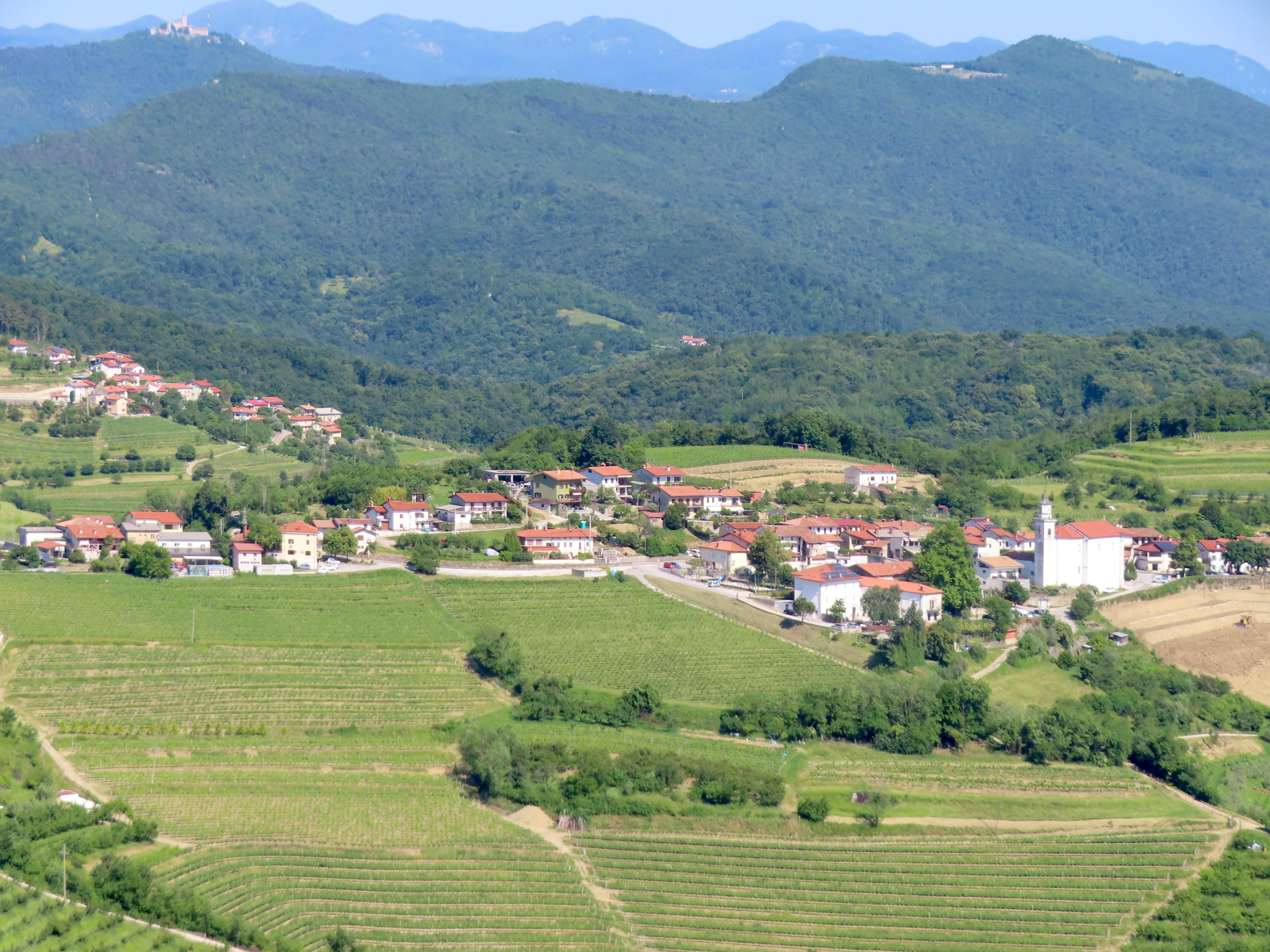

- Location in Slovenia
- Coordinates: 46°0′19.03″N 13°34′37.05″E
- Country: Slovenia
- Traditional region: Slovenian Littoral
- Statistical region: Gorizia
- Municipality: Brda

Area
  - Total: 1.47 km^{2} (0.57 sq mi)
- Elevation: 269.3 m (884 ft)

Population (2020)
  - Total: 258
  - Density: 176/km^{2} (455/sq mi)

Kojsko (pronounced [ˈkoːi̯skɔ]) is a village in the Municipality of Brda in the Littoral region of Slovenia.

The parish church in the village is dedicated to the Assumption of Mary and belongs to the Koper Diocese. A second church belonging to this parish is built on a hill above the village and is dedicated to the Holy Cross.
