= Dobrovo =

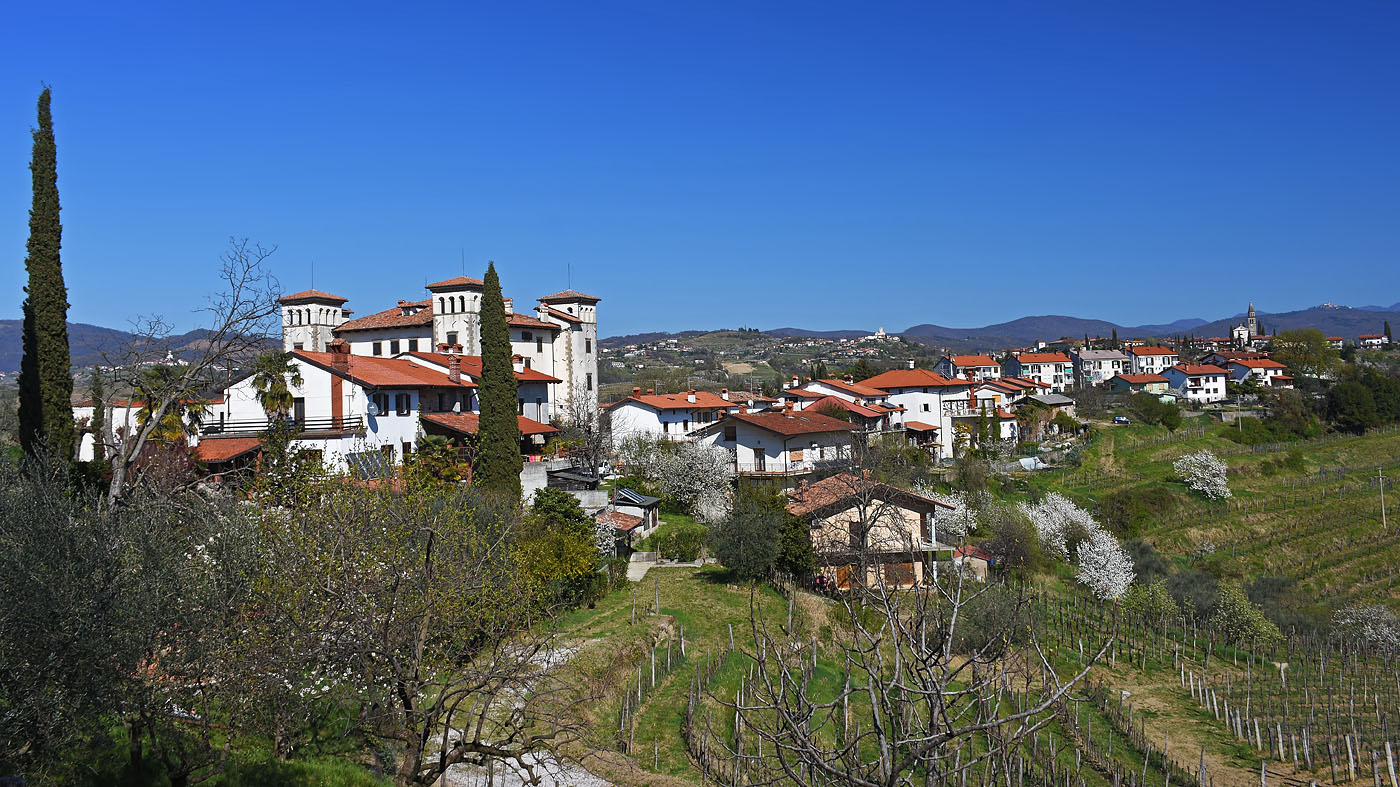

- Location in Slovenia
- Coordinates: 45°59′56.14″N 13°31′46.6″E
- Country: Slovenia
- Traditional region: Slovenian Littoral
- Statistical region: Gorizia
- Municipality: Brda

Area
  - Total: 1.16 km^{2} (0.45 sq mi)
- Elevation: 115 m (377 ft)

Population (2020)
  - Total: 334
  - Density: 288/km^{2} (746/sq mi)

Dobrovo (pronounced [ˈdoːbɾɔʋɔ]; Italian: Castel Dobra) is a settlement the Littoral region of Slovenia, close to the border with Italy. It is the administrative centre of the Municipality of Brda. It lies on the road that connects the Friuli Plain and the Soča Valley.

== Name ==
Dobrovo was attested in written sources as Dobra in 1763–1787. The name is derived from the personal name *Dobrъ (a shortening of a name such as Dobromyslъ, Dobroslavъ, etc.) with the possessive suffix -ov. It is an ellipsis of *Dobrovo (selo) 'Dobrъ's village' or *Dobrovo (bьrdo) 'Dobrъ's hill', referring to a place owned by an early inhabitant. Because of its presumed derivational morphology, it is unlikely that the name is derived from *dǫbъ 'deciduous tree, oak' (cf. Dobrova, Dobrovnik, etc.).

== Dobrovo Castle ==
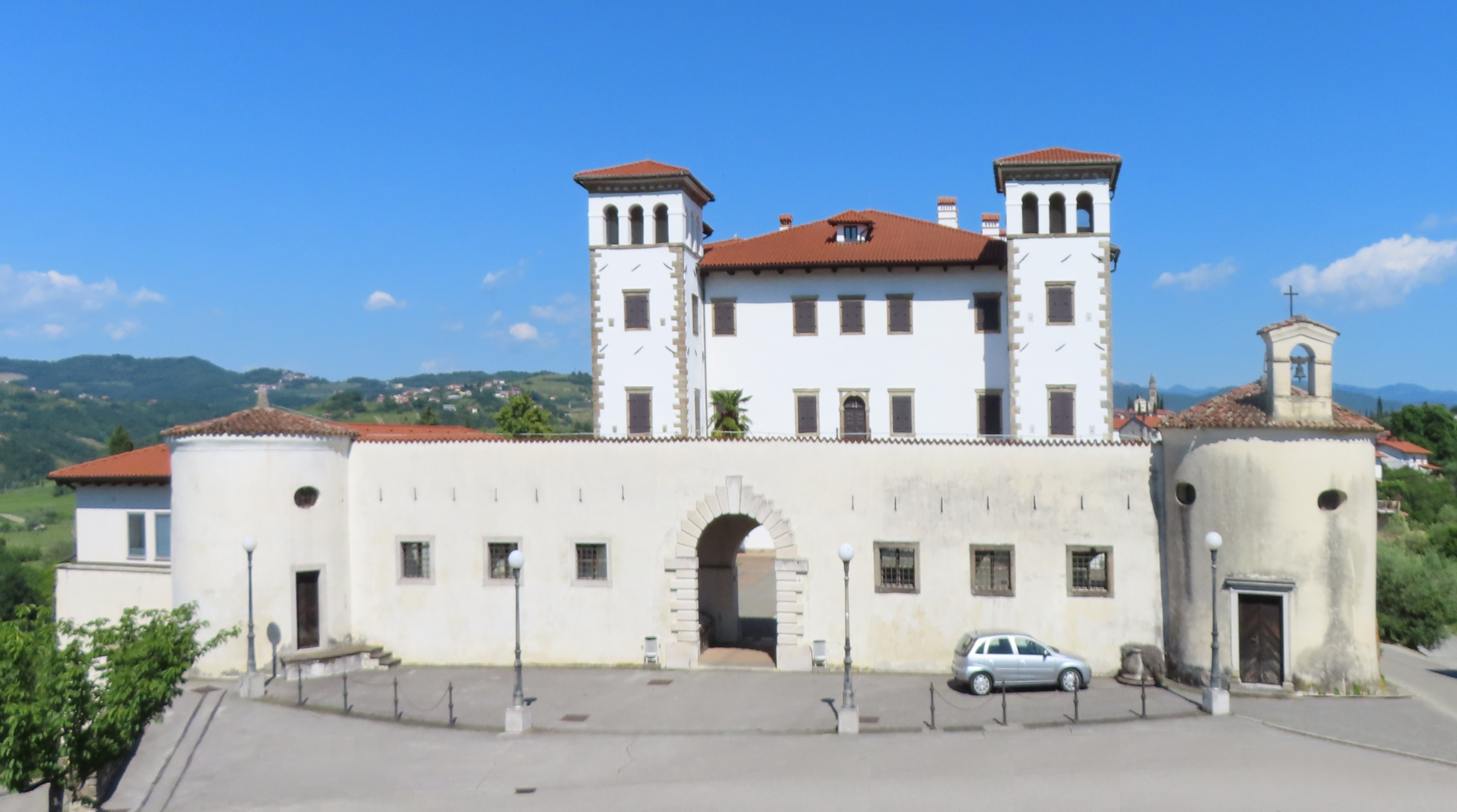
Dobrovo Castle

Dobrovo Castle is a castle in the settlement built around 1600 on the foundations of an older structure. It is an almost perfect square in plan with square turrets on each corner. It houses an art gallery and a museum. The castle chapel is dedicated to Saint Anthony of Padua and belongs to the Parish of Biljana.
