= Gorizia Hills =

Microregion in Slovenia and Italy

Coordinates: 45°59′11″N 13°29′33″E

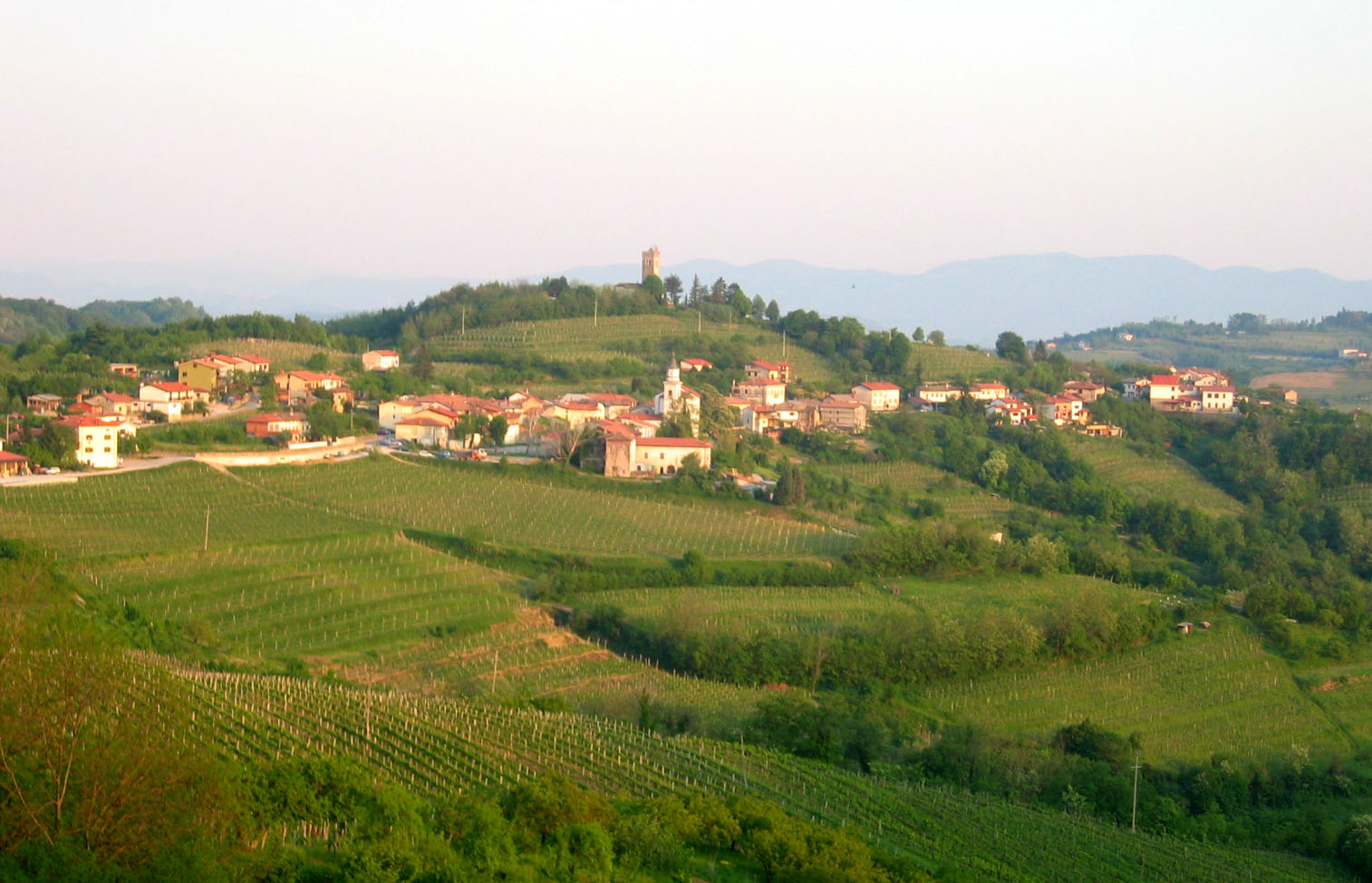
The village of Hum in the Municipality of Brda, in the Slovene part of the Gorizia Hills

The Gorizia Hills (Italian: Collio Goriziano or Collio; Slovene: Goriška brda or Brda; Friulian: Cuei) is a hilly microregion in western Slovenia and northeastern Italy. It lies on the right bank of the Soča (Isonzo) River, north of the Italian town of Gorizia, after which it is named. The region covers around 120 km^{2} (46 sq mi) and has about 7,000 inhabitants, mostly ethnic Slovenes, with a small number of Friulian speakers in its westernmost part (in the municipality of Dolegna del Collio).

Today, the majority of the region is in Slovenia, with around 60% of the territory and 80% of the inhabitants. The Slovene part of the Gorizia Hills lies entirely in the Municipality of Brda. The Italian part lies within the boundaries of the province of Gorizia, and it is divided among the municipalities of San Floriano del Collio, Cormons, and Dolegna del Collio.

The region is predominately a white wine producer with Friulano, Ribolla Gialla, Malvasia Istriana, Chardonnay, Pinot bianco, Pinot grigio, and Sauvignon blanc being the leading varietals. Red wine is produced under the Collio Rosso designation and is usually a blend of Merlot, Cabernet Franc, and Cabernet Sauvignon.

In Italy, the Gorizia Hills are designated Denominazione di origine controllata (DOC) and belong to the Italian wine region of Friuli-Venezia Giulia. The DOC is located in the province of Gorizia, near the border with Slovenia. Some Slovene wine from the region of Brda also carries the designation of Collio due to their vineyards overlapping across the Italian border.

== History ==
The history of the Gorizia Hills has been influenced by its close Italian-Friulian, Slavic, and Austro-Hungarian ties. Historically part of the Patria del Friuli, then later the County of Gorizia, it was annexed to the Kingdom of Italy after the First World War. After the Second World War, the majority of the region became part of Yugoslavia, and only a small strip of territory between the villages of San Floriano del Collio and Dolegna del Collio remained in Italy. The boundaries of the traditional wine region thus extended further eastward into what is now Slovenia. In the 1970s, the Collio Goriziano was one of the Italy's leading white wine producers and was a pioneer in producing fresher, more vibrant white wines using winemaking methodology that focused on minimizing skin contact and oxidation.

== Geography ==
The name Collio is taken from the Italian word Colli, which means 'hillsides' and describes the terrain of the Collio Goriziano region. The Slovene name Brda has the same meaning.

The Gorizia Hills extend from the Judrio River in the west, where it borders the Colli Orientali del Friuli DOC, to the Slovene border on the east. The region continues into Slovenia, where it is entirely included in the Municipality of Brda, which extends from the Italian border to the Soča (Isonzo) River.

To the south is the Isonzo del Friuli DOC, also in the province of Gorizia. Most of the region's vineyards are centered on the comune of Cormons. The soil of the region is composed of calcareous marl and flysch sandstone.

== Viticulture and winemaking ==
The Collio Goriziano is the fourth-largest DOC in the Friuli-Venezia Giulia in terms of areas planted. It is also the fourth-leading producer in terms of volume, trailing the Friuli Grave, Isonzo, and Colli Orientali del Friuli region in production. Over 85% of the Collio production is in white wine grape varieties. While still low in comparison to the rest of Italy, the yields in the Collio Goriziano are higher than the 3.5 tons per acre average of Friuli-Venezia Giulia. In the Collio, the yields average around 4.4 tons/acre (77 hectolitres/hectare), although some quality-conscious producers have lower yields.

The winemaker Mario Schiopetto was one of the first to incorporate German/Austrian winemaking techniques like cold fermentation into white wine production in the Collio Goriziano. Today, winemaking in the region is very technologically advanced, with refrigerated fermentation tanks, pneumatic winepresses, and centrifugation bottling systems. The objective of most Gorizia Hills winemakers is to maximize the fresh fruit and pure varietal characteristic of the grape. To that extent, oak influence is not widely used in this region, although some winemakers are experimenting with its use and different blends of grape varieties to produce more complex wine.

== See also ==
- Uskok War
