= Hattfjelldal =

Hattfjelldal may refer to:

== Places ==
- Hattfjelldal Municipality, a municipality in Nordland county, Norway
- Hattfjelldal (village), a village within Hattfjelldal Municipality in Nordland county, Norway
- Hattfjelldal Church, a church in Hattfjelldal Municipality in Nordland county, Norway
- Hattfjelldal Airport, an airport in Hattfjelldal Municipality in Nordland county, Norway
