= Elsvatnet =

Lake in Hattfjelldal, Norway

Elsvatnet (Norwegian) Aalesjaevrie (Southern Sami)
- Interactive map of the lake
- Location: Hattfjelldal Municipality, Nordland
- Coordinates: 65.57296°N 14.15875°E
- Basin countries: Norway
- Max. length: 4 kilometres (2.5 mi)
- Max. width: 1 kilometre (0.62 mi)
- Surface area: 2.45 km^{2} (0.95 sq mi)
- Shore length^{1}: 13.44 kilometres (8.35 mi)
- Surface elevation: 520 metres (1,710 ft)
- References: NVE
- ^{1} Shore length is not a well-defined measure.

Elsvatnet (Norwegian) or Aalesjaevrie (Southern Sami) is a lake in Hattfjelldal Municipality in Nordland county, Norway. It lies about 6 kilometres (3.7 mi) east of the village of Hattfjelldal, about half-way between the lakes Røsvatnet and Unkervatnet.

== See also ==
- List of lakes in Norway
- Geography of Norway
