= Krutvatnet =

Lake in Hattfjelldal, Norway

Krutvatnet (Norwegian) Kruvhtegenjaevrie (Southern Sami)
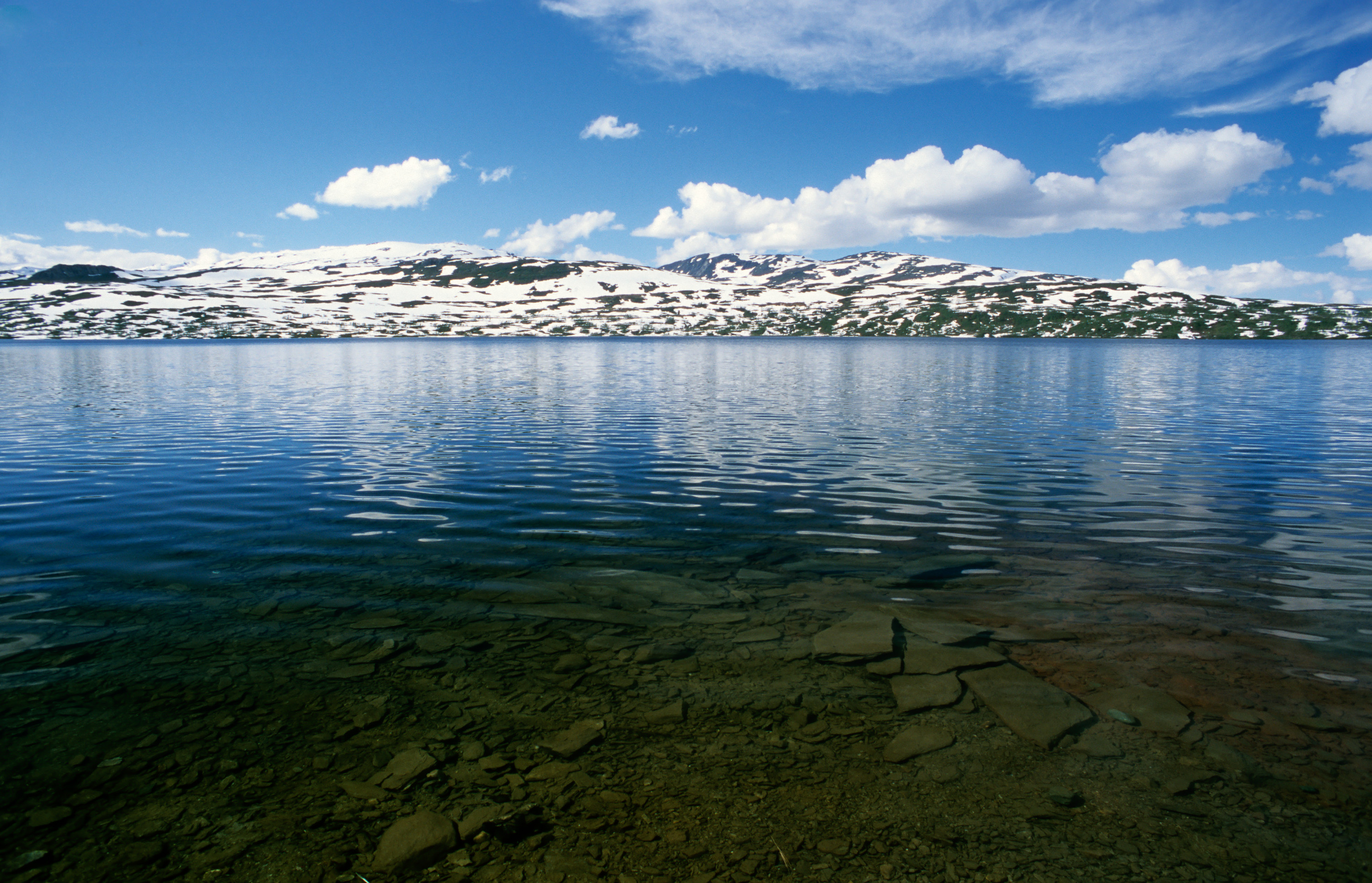
- Interactive map of the lake
- Location: Hattfjelldal Municipality, Nordland
- Coordinates: 65.6975°N 14.3848°E
- Basin countries: Norway
- Max. length: 7.3 kilometres (4.5 mi)
- Max. width: 2.1 kilometres (1.3 mi)
- Surface area: 9.9 km^{2} (3.8 sq mi)
- Shore length^{1}: 23.4 kilometres (14.5 mi)
- Surface elevation: 586 metres (1,923 ft)
- References: NVE
- ^{1} Shore length is not a well-defined measure.

Krutvatnet (Norwegian) or Kruvhtegenjaevrie (Southern Sami) is a lake in Hattfjelldal Municipality in Nordland county, Norway. It lies about 7.5 kilometres (4.7 mi) east of the lake Røsvatnet and about 2 kilometres (1.2 mi) west of the border with Sweden. The Norwegian National Road 73 runs on the southern shore of the lake on its way from the village of Hattfjelldal to the village of Tärnaby in Sweden. The word krut means gunpowder in Norwegian and Swedish, but the name does not come from that, but is a loan from the Sami name.

== See also ==
- List of lakes in Norway
- Geography of Norway
