= Unkervatnet =

Lake in Hattfjelldal, Norway

Unkervatnet (Norwegian) Åanghkejaevrie (Southern Sami)
- Interactive map of the lake
- Location: Hattfjelldal Municipality, Nordland
- Coordinates: 65.5098°N 14.1845°E
- Primary inflows: Skardmodalselva river
- Primary outflows: Unkerelva river
- Catchment area: Vefsna
- Basin countries: Norway
- Max. length: 8 kilometres (5.0 mi)
- Max. width: 2.5 kilometres (1.6 mi)
- Surface area: 14.3 km^{2} (5.5 sq mi)
- Shore length^{1}: 24.95 kilometres (15.50 mi)
- Surface elevation: 321 metres (1,053 ft)
- References: NVE
- ^{1} Shore length is not a well-defined measure.

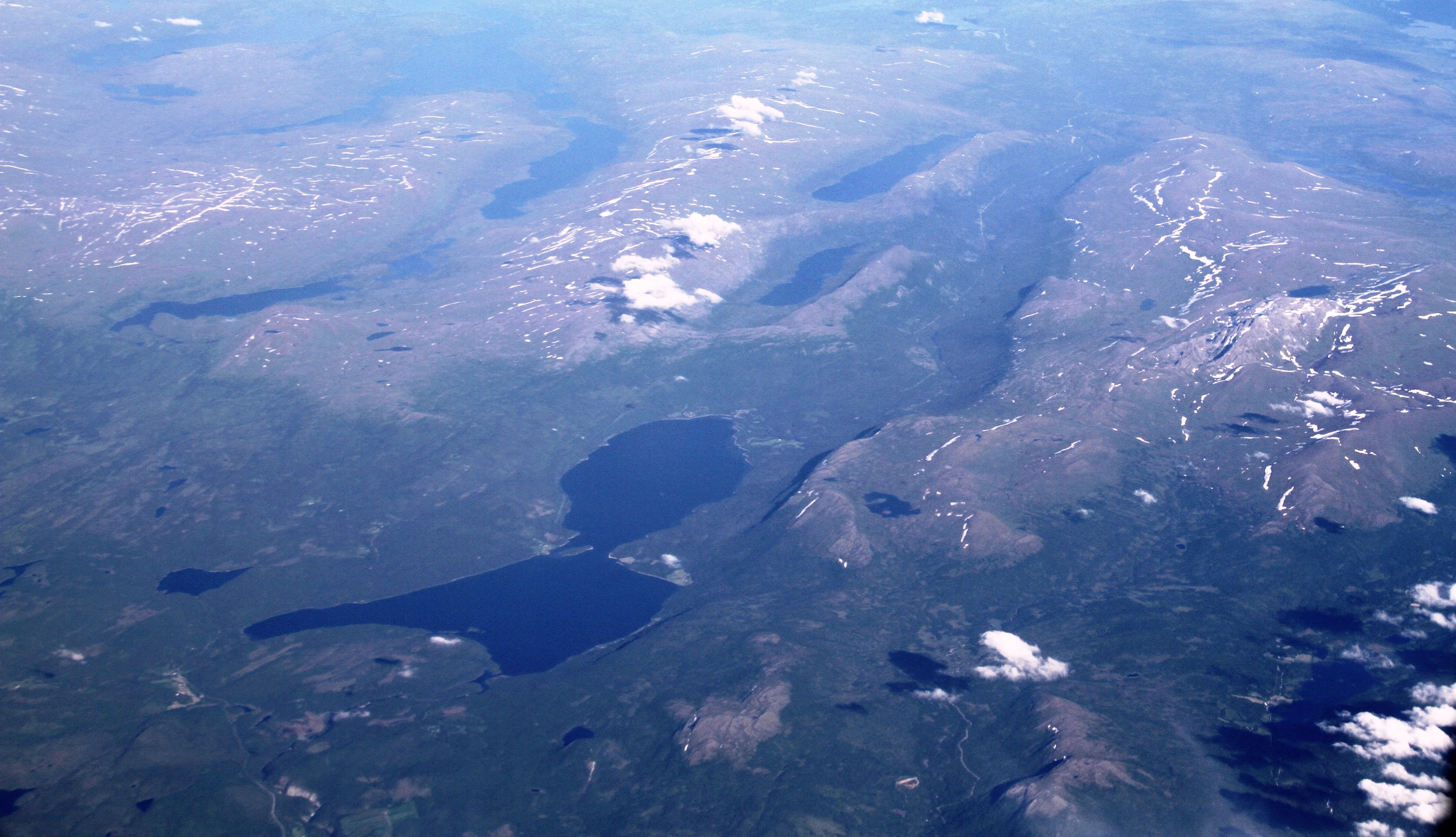
Aerial view of Unkervatnet in Hattfjelldal

Unkervatnet (Norwegian) or Åanghkejaevrie (Southern Sami) is a lake in Hattfjelldal Municipality in Nordland county, Norway. It is a good lake for fishing lake trout and Arctic char both during summer and winter. The river flowing into the lake from the east is called Skarmodalselva, and the outflowing river is called Unkerelva (which itself flows into the river Vefsna). For tourists, there are two places available by the shoreside: Ørnes camping at the eastern end of the lake, and Tjolmen, situated on the north side of the lake's middle. The road from the village of Hattfjelldal to the village of Dikanäs in Sweden runs along the north side of the lake.

== See also ==
- List of lakes in Norway
- Geography of Norway
