= Simskardvatnet =

Lake in Hattfjelldal, Norway

Simskardvatnet (Norwegian) Sijdurrienjaevrie (Southern Sami)
- Interactive map of the lake
- Location: Hattfjelldal Municipality, Nordland
- Coordinates: 65.2831°N 13.8143°E
- Basin countries: Norway
- Max. length: 4 kilometres (2.5 mi)
- Max. width: 1.2 kilometres (0.75 mi)
- Surface area: 3.47 km^{2} (1.34 sq mi)
- Shore length^{1}: 14.77 kilometres (9.18 mi)
- Surface elevation: 877 metres (2,877 ft)
- References: NVE
- ^{1} Shore length is not a well-defined measure.

Simskardvatnet (Norwegian) or Sijdurrienjaevrie (Southern Sami) is a lake in Hattfjelldal Municipality in Nordland county, Norway. It is the headwaters of the river Vefsna. The lake lies within Børgefjell National Park, just east of the municipal border with Grane Municipality.

== See also ==
- List of lakes in Norway
- Geography of Norway
