= Varntresk =

Village in Hattfjelldal Municipality, Norway

Varntresk Varntresken
- Village
- Interactive map of Varntresk; Varntresken
- Location within Nordland Location within Norway
- Coordinates: 65.8248°N 14.1974°E
- Country: Norway
- Region: Northern Norway
- County: Nordland
- District: Helgeland
- Municipality: Hattfjelldal Municipality
- Elevation: 409 m (1,342 ft)
- Time zone: UTC+01:00 (CET)
  - Summer (DST): UTC+02:00 (CEST)
- Post Code: 8690 Hattfjelldal

Varntresk or Varntresken is a village in Hattfjelldal Municipality in Nordland county, Norway. The village is located on the eastern shore of the large lake Røsvatnet. The lake Famvatnet lies about 8 kilometres (5.0 mi) east of the village. Varntresk Church is located in this village, and it serves the northern part of the municipality. There is also a small school in Varntresk. The village of Hattfjelldal, the municipal centre, lies about 30 kilometres (19 mi) to the south.
