= Ranseren =

Lake on the border of Norway-Sweden

Ranseren (Norwegian) Bije-Ransarn (Swedish) Bijjie Raentsere (Southern Sami)
- Interactive map of the lake
- Location: Hattfjelldal, Nordland; Vilhelmina, Västerbotten
- Coordinates: 65.1868°N 14.3257°E
- Basin countries: Norway and Sweden
- Max. length: 5 kilometres (3.1 mi)
- Max. width: 1 kilometre (0.62 mi)
- Surface area: 2.75 km^{2} (1.06 sq mi) (1.83 sq. km. in Norway)
- Shore length^{1}: 17.28 kilometres (10.74 mi)
- Surface elevation: 803 metres (2,635 ft)
- References: NVE
- ^{1} Shore length is not a well-defined measure.

Ranseren (Norwegian), also known as Bije-Ransarn (Swedish) or Bijjie Raentsere (Southern Sami), is a lake on the border between Norway and Sweden. The Norwegian side lies in Hattfjelldal Municipality in Nordland county (and it is inside Børgefjell National Park). The Swedish side of the lake is called Bije-Ransaren, which means "the upper Ransaren" and this part lies in Vilhelmina Municipality in Västerbotten County.

The brook that flows from the lake on the east side is called Saxån. It leads to the larger lake, Ransarn, which is located in Vilhelmina Municipality in Sweden. Bije-Ransaren is called the upper Ransarn in contrast to the bigger lake, which is referred to as "lower" Ransarn.

The lake lies about 10 kilometres (6.2 mi) from the village of Stekenjokk in Vilhelmina, Sweden. South of the Swedish side of the lake, about 0.5 kilometres (0.31 mi) from the border, is a small Sami house that was used during reindeer marking season.

== See also ==
- List of lakes in Norway
- Geography of Norway
