= Svenskvollen =

Village in Hattfjelldal Municipality, Norway

Svenskvollen Svenskvoll
- Village
- Interactive map of Svenskvollen
- Location within Nordland Location within Norway
- Coordinates: 65.3970°N 14.0116°E
- Country: Norway
- Region: Northern Norway
- County: Nordland
- District: Helgeland
- Municipality: Hattfjelldal Municipality
- Elevation: 366 m (1,201 ft)
- Time zone: UTC+01:00 (CET)
  - Summer (DST): UTC+02:00 (CEST)
- Post Code: 8690 Hattfjelldal

Svenskvollen is a village in Hattfjelldal Municipality in Nordland county, Norway. The village lies along the river Vefsna (also called Susna) in the Susendal valley, just north of Børgefjell National Park. The village is home to Susendal Church, which serves the southern part of Hattfjelldal. The village of Hattfjelldal, the municipal centre, lies about 25 kilometres (16 mi) to the north.
