= Daningen =

Lake in Hattfjelldal, Norway

Daningen (Norwegian) Daarenege (Southern Sami)
- Interactive map of the lake
- Location: Hattfjelldal Municipality, Nordland
- Coordinates: 65.3610°N 14.4009°E
- Basin countries: Norway
- Max. length: 3.5 kilometres (2.2 mi)
- Max. width: 1.5 kilometres (0.93 mi)
- Surface area: 3.72 km^{2} (1.44 sq mi)
- Shore length^{1}: 15.43 kilometres (9.59 mi)
- Surface elevation: 750 metres (2,460 ft)
- References: NVE
- ^{1} Shore length is not a well-defined measure.

Daningen (Norwegian) or Daarenege (Southern Sami) is a lake in Hattfjelldal Municipality in Nordland county, Norway. The lake lies about 2 kilometres (1.2 mi) west of the border with Sweden and about 4 kilometres (2.5 mi) northeast of the river Vefsna.

== See also ==
- List of lakes in Norway
- Geography of Norway
