= Kjerringvatnet (Hattfjelldal) =

Lake in Nordland, Norway

Kjerringvatnet (Norwegian) Aahkanjaevrie (Southern Sami)
- Interactive map of the lake
- Location: Hattfjelldal Municipality, Nordland
- Coordinates: 65.7477°N 13.8563°E
- Basin countries: Norway
- Max. length: 1.8 kilometres (1.1 mi)
- Max. width: 500 metres (1,600 ft)
- Surface area: 3.42 km^{2} (1.32 sq mi)
- Shore length^{1}: 11.48 kilometres (7.13 mi)
- Surface elevation: 718 metres (2,356 ft)
- References: NVE
- ^{1} Shore length is not a well-defined measure.

Kjerringvatnet (Norwegian) or Aahkanjaevrie (Southern Sami) is a lake in Hattfjelldal Municipality in Nordland county, Norway. The lake lies about 2 kilometres (1.2 mi) west of the lake Røsvatnet.

== See also ==
- List of lakes in Norway
- Geography of Norway
