= Famvatnet =

Lake in Hattfjelldal, Norway

Famvatnet (Norwegian) Faepmiejaevrie (Southern Sami)
- Interactive map of the lake
- Location: Hattfjelldal Municipality, Nordland
- Coordinates: 65.8027°N 14.4084°E
- Basin countries: Norway
- Max. length: 4 kilometres (2.5 mi)
- Max. width: 2.5 kilometres (1.6 mi)
- Surface area: 6.49 km^{2} (2.51 sq mi)
- Shore length^{1}: 19.78 kilometres (12.29 mi)
- Surface elevation: 494 metres (1,621 ft)
- References: NVE
- ^{1} Shore length is not a well-defined measure.

Famvatnet (Norwegian) or Faepmiejaevrie (Southern Sami) is a lake in Hattfjelldal Municipality in Nordland county, Norway. The lake is located about 7 kilometres (4.3 mi) east of Røsvatnet and about 7.5 kilometres (4.7 mi) west of the border with Sweden. The nearby lake Krutvatnet lies about 9 kilometres (5.6 mi) to the south.

== See also ==
- List of lakes in Norway
- Geography of Norway
