= Jetnamsklumpen =

Mountain in Nordland, Norway

Jetnamsklumpen (Norwegian) Jitnemensnuhkie (Southern Sami)
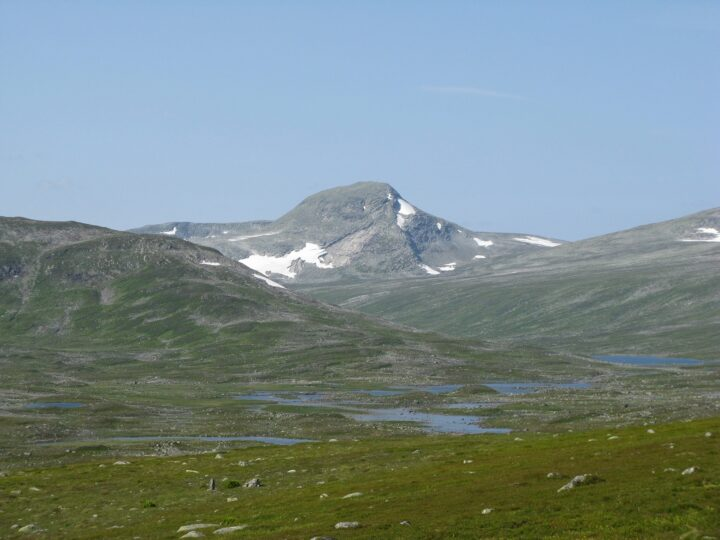

Highest point
- Elevation: 1,513 m (4,964 ft)
- Listing: 13 at List of highest points of Norwegian counties
- Coordinates: 65.1311°N 14.1917°E

Geography
- Interactive map of the mountain
- Location: Trøndelag and Nordland, Norway
- Topo map(s): 1925 II Børgefjellet (west) and 2025 III Ranseren (east)

Jetnamsklumpen (Norwegian) or Jitnemensnuhkie (Southern Sami) is the highest point of Jetnamfjellet, a mountain on the border of Røyrvik Municipality (in Trøndelag county) and Hattfjelldal Municipality (in Nordland county) in Norway. The 1,513-metre (4,964 ft) tall mountain is located in the Børgefjell National Park, and it is the highest point in Trøndelag county.

The eastern point of the large Jetnamsfjellet mountain, about 6 kilometres (3.7 mi) east of Jetnamsklumpen is considerably lower, at 1,206 metres (3,957 ft), but it is a quadripoint for four counties: Trøndelag and Nordland in Norway, and Jämtland and Västerbotten in Sweden.

== Name ==
The first element is from the Southern Sami language word "jitneme" which means "area covered with snow", and the last element is the finite form of Norwegian language word "klump" which means "clump" or "round mountain".

== See also ==
- List of highest points of Norwegian counties
