= Alnæs =

Alnæs is a surname. Notable people with this surname include:

- Eyvind Alnæs (1872–1932), Norwegian composer, pianist, organist and choir director
- Finn Alnæs (1932–1991), Norwegian novelist
- Frode Alnæs (born 1959), Norwegian jazz guitarist and composer
- Ivar Alnæs (1868–1956), Norwegian teacher and linguist
- Karsten Alnæs (born 1938), Norwegian author, historian, and journalist
- Kirsten Alnæs (1927–2021), Norwegian social anthropologist
