= Varntresk Church =

Church in Nordland, Norway

- Varntresk kirke
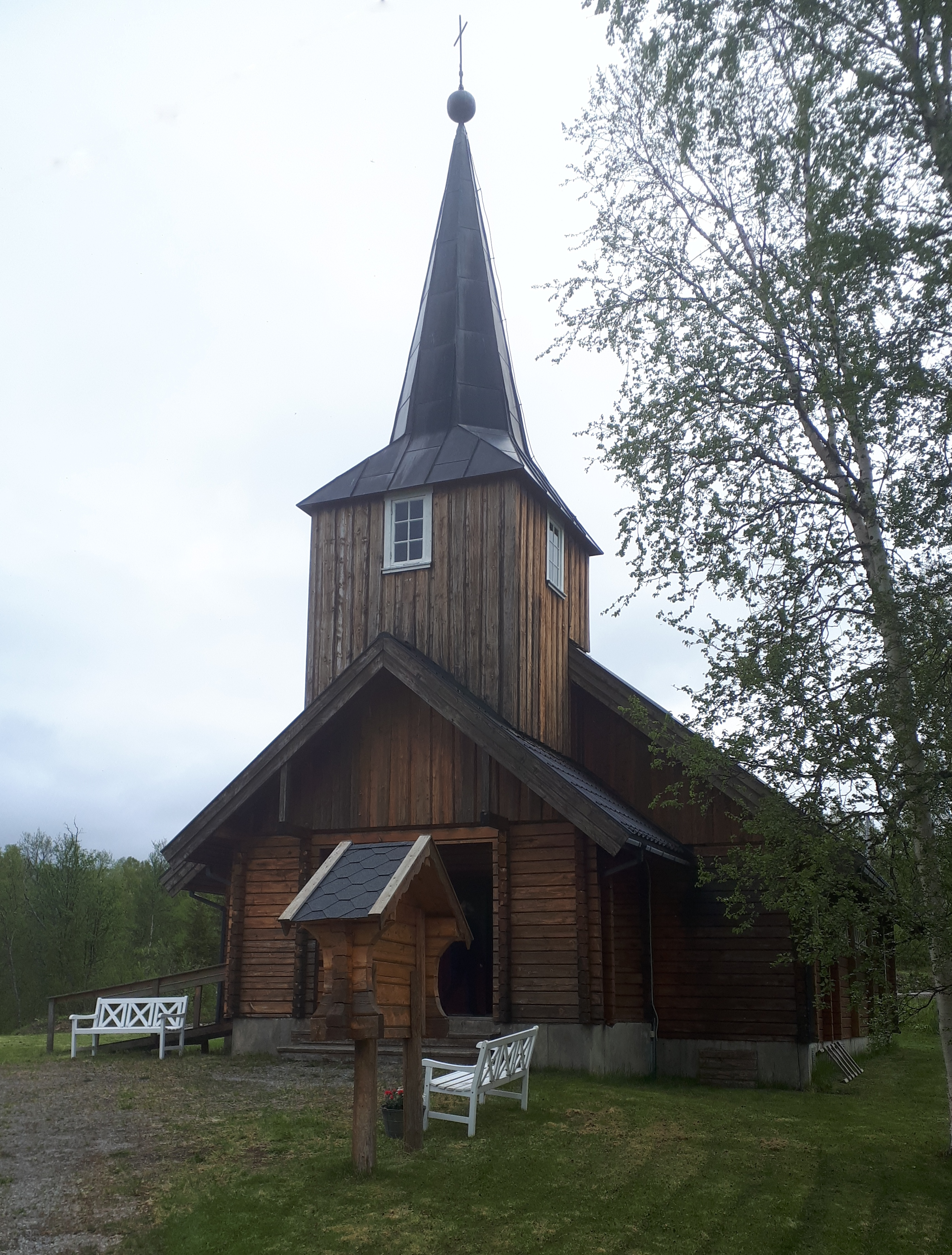
- View of the church
- Varntresk Church
- 65.8223608°N 14.19768118°E
- Location: Hattfjelldal Municipality, Nordland
- Country: Norway
- Denomination: Church of Norway
- Churchmanship: Evangelical Lutheran

History
- Status: Parish church
- Founded: 1986
- Consecrated: 31 Aug 1986

Architecture
- Functional status: Active
- Architect: Pål Guthorm Kavli
- Architectural type: Long church
- Completed: 1986 (40 years ago)

Specifications
- Capacity: 70
- Materials: Wood

Administration
- Diocese: Sør-Hålogaland
- Deanery: Indre Helgeland prosti
- Parish: Hattfjelldal
- Norwegian Cultural Heritage Site
- Type: Church
- Status: Not protected
- ID: 85773

Varntresk Church (Norwegian: Varntresk kirke) is a parish church of the Church of Norway in Hattfjelldal Municipality in Nordland county, Norway. It is located in the village of Varntresk. It is one of the churches for the Hattfjelldal parish which is part of the Indre Helgeland prosti (deanery) in the Diocese of Sør-Hålogaland. The brown, wooden church was built in a long church style in 1986 using plans drawn up by the architect Pål Guthorm Kavli. The church seats about 70 people. The church was consecrated on 31 August 1986.

== See also ==
- List of churches in Sør-Hålogaland
