= Susendal Church =

Church in Nordland, Norway

- Susendal kirke
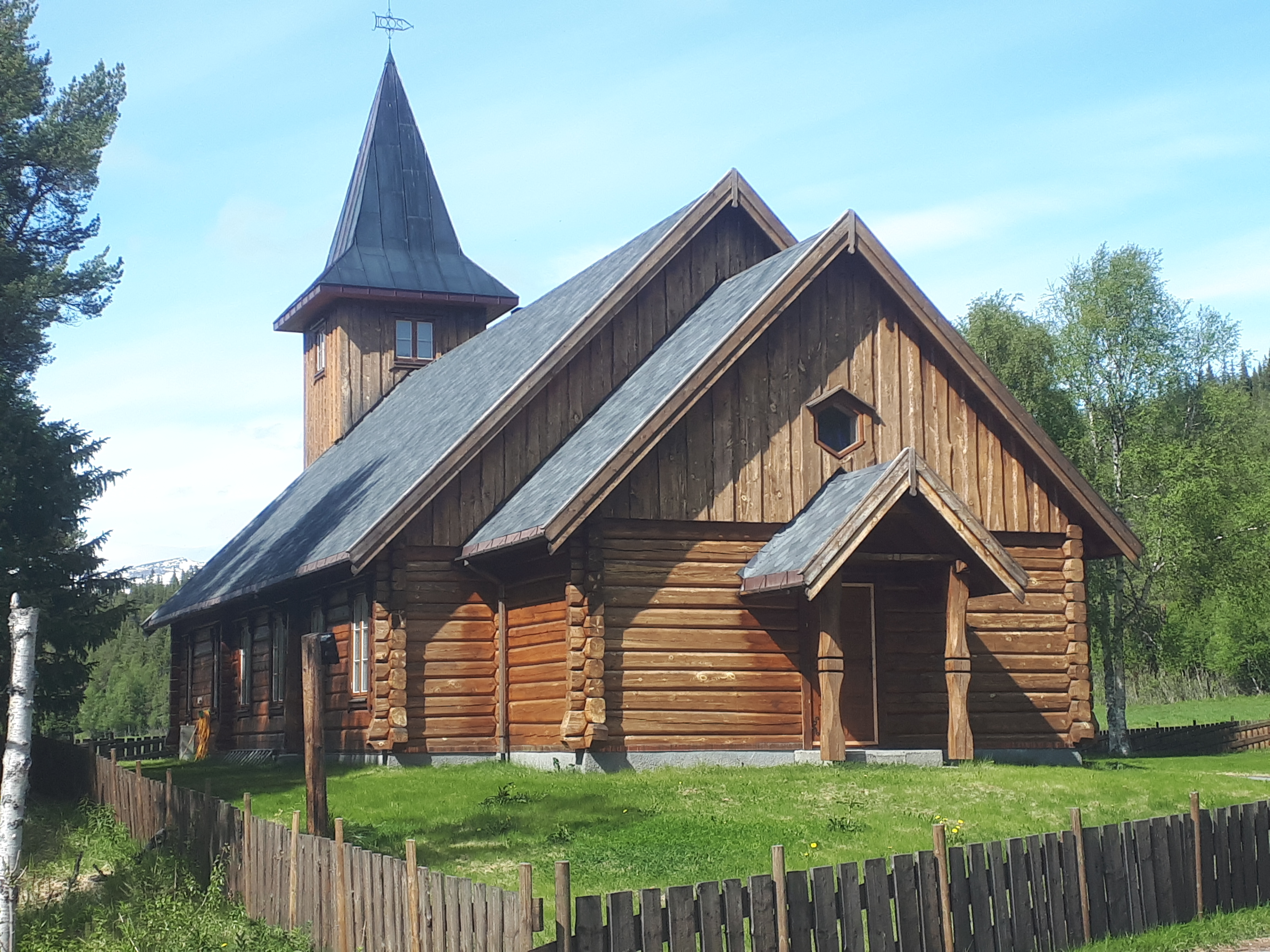
- View of the church
- Susendal Church
- 65.39463375°N 14.01333242°E
- Location: Hattfjelldal Municipality, Nordland
- Country: Norway
- Denomination: Church of Norway
- Churchmanship: Evangelical Lutheran

History
- Status: Parish church
- Founded: 1916
- Consecrated: 14 Oct 2001

Architecture
- Functional status: Active
- Architect: Jim Inge Bøasæter
- Architectural type: Long church
- Completed: 2001 (25 years ago)

Specifications
- Capacity: 150
- Materials: Wood

Administration
- Diocese: Sør-Hålogaland
- Deanery: Indre Helgeland prosti
- Parish: Hattfjelldal
- Norwegian Cultural Heritage Site
- Type: Church
- Status: Not protected
- ID: 85006

Susendal Church (Norwegian: Susendal kirke) is a parish church of the Church of Norway in Hattfjelldal Municipality in Nordland county, Norway. It is located in the village of Svenskvollen in the Susendal valley. It is one of the churches for the Hattfjelldal parish which is part of the Indre Helgeland prosti (deanery) in the Diocese of Sør-Hålogaland. The brown, wooden church was built in a long church style in 2001 using plans drawn up by the architect Jim Inge Bøasæter. The church seats about 150 people.

== History ==
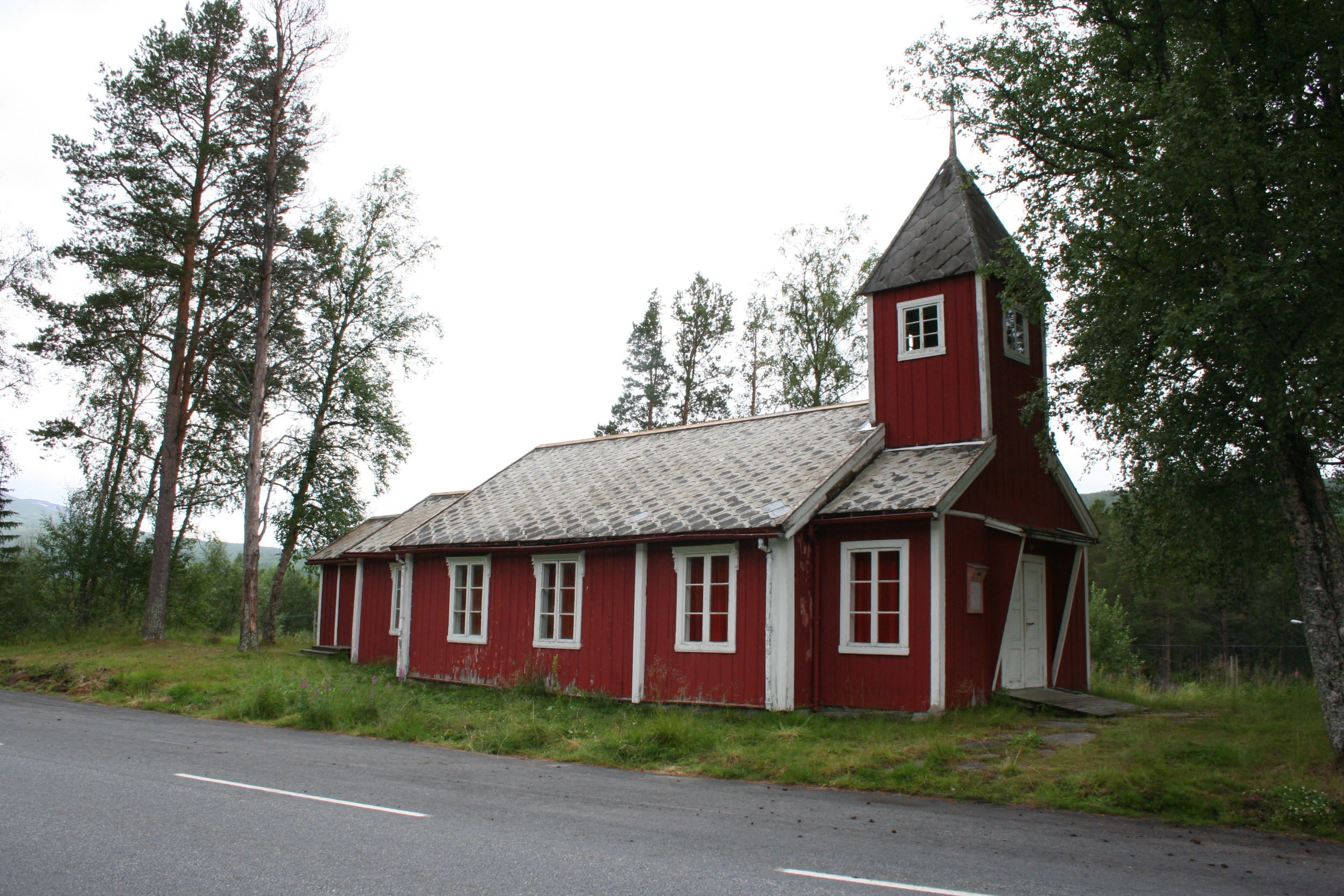
View of the old chapel, in use from 1916 until 2001

A chapel was built at Svenskvollen in the Susendal valley in 1916. That red chapel seated about 70 people. In 1998 when the Bishop visited the chapel, it was decided that the church was in poor condition and a new church should be built to replace it. In 2001, a new church was built right next door. The new wooden church seats about 150 people. It was consecrated on 14 October 2001 by the Bishop Øystein Ingar Larsen.

== See also ==
- List of churches in Sør-Hålogaland
