= Hattfjelldal Municipality =

Municipality in Nordland, Norway

Hattfjelldal Municipality Hattfjelldal kommune Aarborten tjїelte
- Municipality
- Hatfjelddalen herred (historic name)
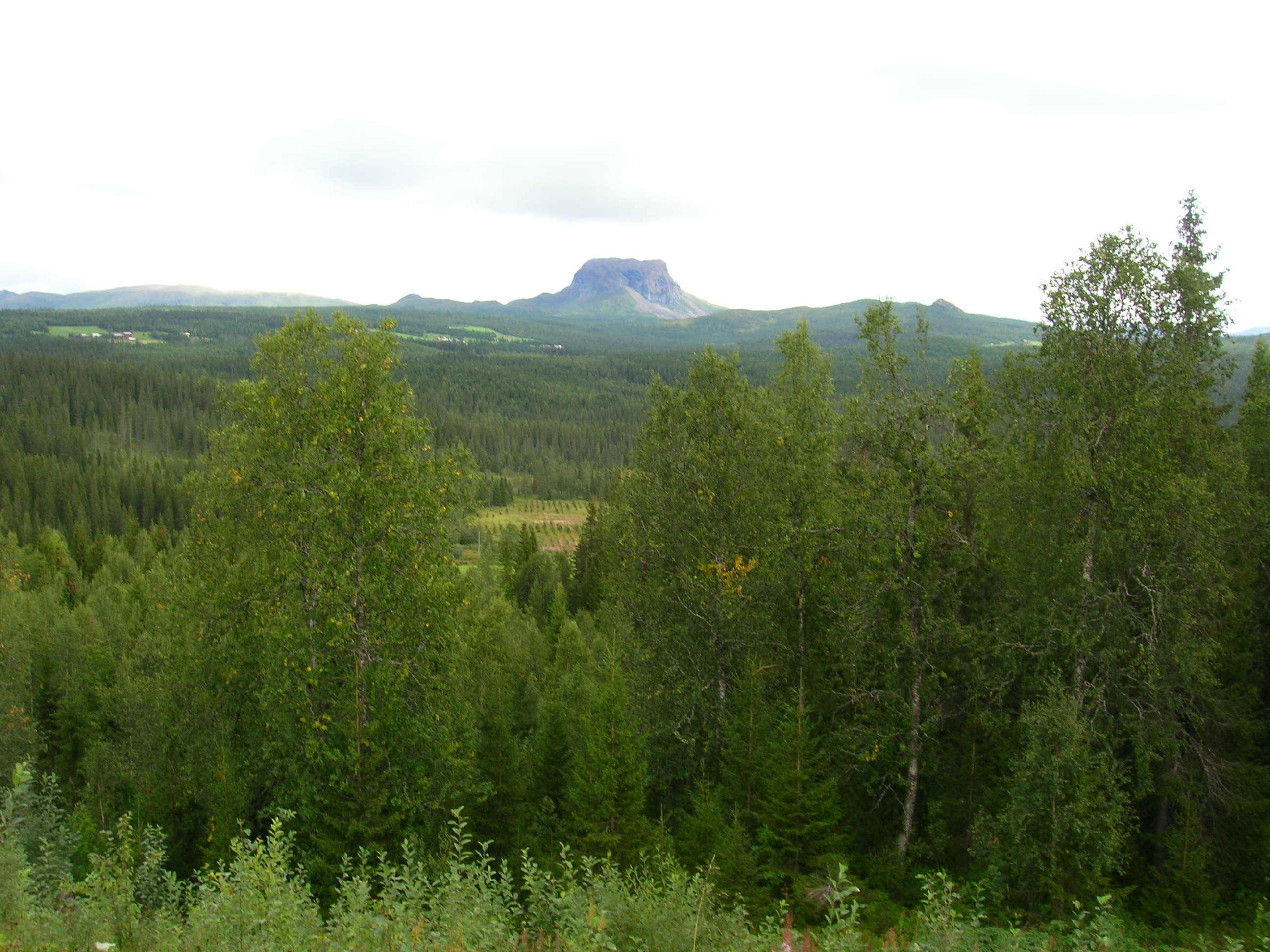
- View of Hattfjell (lit. 'hat mountain')

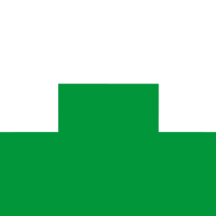
- Flag Coat of arms

- Nordland within Norway

- Hattfjelldal within Nordland
- Coordinates: 65°32′51″N 14°08′04″E
- Country: Norway
- County: Nordland
- District: Helgeland
- Established: 1862
  - Preceded by: Vefsn Municipality
- Administrative centre: Hattfjelldal

Government
  - Mayor (2023): Sølvi Andersen (Ap)

Area
  - Total: 2,684.35 km^{2} (1,036.43 sq mi)
  - Land: 2,411.16 km^{2} (930.95 sq mi)
  - Water: 273.19 km^{2} (105.48 sq mi) 10.2%
  - Rank: #20 in Norway
- Highest elevation: 1,699.92 m (5,577.2 ft)

Population (2024)
  - Total: 1,284
  - Rank: #315 in Norway
  - Density: 0.5/km^{2} (1.3/sq mi)
  - Change (10 years): ▼ −14.4%
- Demonym: Hattfjelldaling

Official languages
  - Norwegian form: Neutral
  - Sámi form: Southern Sami
- Time zone: UTC+01:00 (CET)
  - Summer (DST): UTC+02:00 (CEST)
- ISO 3166 code: NO-1826
- Website: Official website

Hattfjelldal or Aarborte (Southern Sami) is a municipality in Nordland county, Norway. It is part of the Helgeland traditional region. The administrative centre of the municipality is the village of Hattfjelldal. Other villages include Grubben, Svenskvollen, and Varntresk. Hattfjelldal Airfield is located in the village of Hattfjelldal.

The 2,684-square-kilometre (1,036 sq mi) municipality is the 20th largest by area out of the 357 municipalities in Norway. Hattfjelldal Municipality is the 315th most populous municipality in Norway with a population of 1,284. The municipality's population density is 0.5 inhabitants per square kilometre (1.3/sq mi) and its population has decreased by 14.4% over the previous 10-year period.

Hattfjelldal is one of the last strongholds for the severely endangered Southern Sami language. It was also one of the municipalities in Norway involved in the Terra Securities scandal.

== General information ==
The municipality of Hattfjelldal was established in 1862 when it was separated from the large Vefsn Municipality. The initial population of Hattfjelldal Municipality was 961. During the 1960s, there were many municipal mergers across Norway due to the work of the Schei Committee. On 1 January 1964, the part of Hattfjelldal on the north side of the lake Røsvatnet (population: 168) was transferred to the neighboring Hemnes Municipality.

=== Name ===
The municipality (originally the parish) is named after the old Hattfjelldalen farm (referred to as "Hatfieldalen" in 1723) where the first Hattfjelldal Church was built. The first element of the name comes from the local mountain Hattfjellet which has a hat-like shape. The mountain name is derived from the genitive case of the word hǫttr which means "hat" and the word fjall which means "mountain". The last element of the name is the definite form of the word dalr which means "valley" or "dale". Thus it is the "hat-shaped mountain valley". Historically, the name of the municipality was spelled Hatfjelddalen. On 6 January 1908, a royal resolution changed the spelling of the name of the municipality to Hatfjelldalen (removing one "d"). On 3 November 1917, a royal resolution changed the spelling of the name of the municipality to Hatfjelldal (removing the definite form ending). On 29 January 1926, the spelling was changed again, this time by adding a "t" to make it Hattfjelldal.

On 14 June 2019, the national government approved a resolution to add a co-equal, official Southern Sami language name for the municipality: Aarborte. The spelling of the Sami language name changes depending on how it is used. It is called Aarborte when it is spelled alone, but it is Aarborten tjїelte when using the Sami language equivalent to "Hattfjelldal Municipality".

=== Coat of arms ===
The coat of arms was granted on 24 October 1986. The official blazon is "Per fess argent and vert embattled with one battlement" (Norwegian: Delt av sølv og grønt ved tindesnitt med en enkelt tinde). This means the arms have a field (background) that is divided by a horizontal line that has a rectangular raised area. The field above the line has a tincture of argent which means it is commonly colored white, but if it is made out of metal, then silver is used. Below the line, the field is colored green. The arms were designed to mimic the local Hattfjellet mountain which rises above the terrain and can be seen for great distances. The mountain has steep sides with a rather flat plateau at the top, giving it a distinctive look. The design is a canting element since the name of the municipality means "hat mountain valley". The arms were designed by Arvid Sveen.

=== Churches ===
The Church of Norway has one parish (sokn) within Hattfjelldal Municipality. It is part of the Indre Helgeland prosti (deanery) in the Diocese of Sør-Hålogaland.

Churches in Hattfjelldal Municipality
Parish (sokn)	Church name	Location of the church	Year built
Hattfjelldal	Hattfjelldal Church	Hattfjelldal	1868
Hattfjelldal	Susendal Church	Svenskvollen	2001
Hattfjelldal	Varntresk Church	Varntresk	1986

== Geography ==
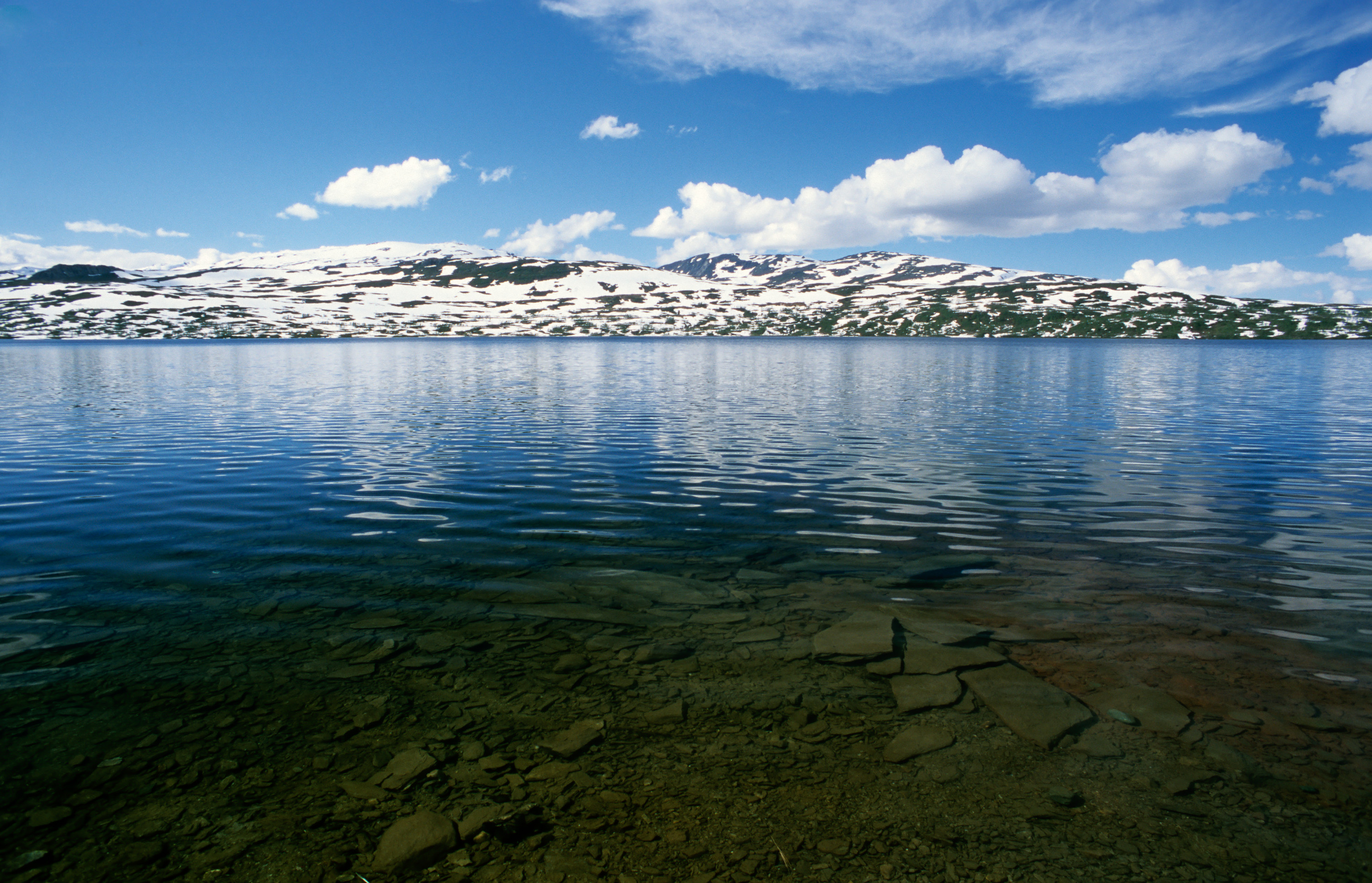
View of the lake Krutvatnet

Hattfjelldal Municipality lies along the Swedish border in the southeastern part of Nordland county. The lake Røsvatnet (Southern Sami: Reevhtse) lies on the border between Hattfjelldal Municipality and Hemnes Municipality, and it serves as a reservoir. It has been the site of human occupation since the Stone Age. Its area of 219 square kilometres (85 sq mi) makes it the second largest lake in Norway by surface area. Other lakes in the region include Daningen, Elsvatnet, Famnvatnet, Jengelvatnet, Kjerringvatnet, Krutvatnet, Ranseren, Simskardvatnet, and Unkervatnet. The large river Vefsna runs through the municipality.

Børgefjell National Park is partly located in the southern part of Hattfjelldal Municipality, as is Jetnamsklumpen, a prominent mountain. There are several nature reserves, such as Varnvassdalen with a varied topography and old growth forest of pine, birch and some spruce. The highest point in the municipality is the 1,699.92-metre (5,577.2 ft) tall mountain Kvigtinden (Southern Sami: Voenjelensnjurhtjie) on the border with Grane Municipality.

== Government ==
Hattfjelldal Municipality is responsible for primary education (through 10th grade), outpatient health services, senior citizen services, welfare and other social services, zoning, economic development, and municipal roads and utilities. The municipality is governed by a municipal council of directly elected representatives. The mayor is indirectly elected by a vote of the municipal council. The municipality is under the jurisdiction of the Helgeland District Court and the Hålogaland Court of Appeal.

=== Municipal council ===
The municipal council (Kommunestyre) of Hattfjelldal Municipality is made up of 15 representatives that are elected to four year terms. The tables below show the current and historical composition of the council by political party.

Hattfjelldal kommunestyre 2023–2027
Party name (in Norwegian)	Number of representatives
Labour Party (Arbeiderpartiet)	8
Centre Party (Senterpartiet)	7
Total number of members:	15

Hattfjelldal kommunestyre 2019–2023
Party name (in Norwegian)	Number of representatives
Labour Party (Arbeiderpartiet)	5
Centre Party (Senterpartiet)	5
Hattfjelldal Local List (Hattfjelldal Bygdeliste)	1
Total number of members:	11

Hattfjelldal kommunestyre 2015–2019
Party name (in Norwegian)	Number of representatives
Labour Party (Arbeiderpartiet)	7
Centre Party (Senterpartiet)	6
Socialist Left Party (Sosialistisk Venstreparti)	1
Hattfjelldal Local List (Hattfjelldal Bygdeliste)	3
Total number of members:	17

Hattfjelldal kommunestyre 2011–2015
Party name (in Norwegian)	Number of representatives
Labour Party (Arbeiderpartiet)	7
Centre Party (Senterpartiet)	8
Socialist Left Party (Sosialistisk Venstreparti)	2
Total number of members:	17

Hattfjelldal kommunestyre 2007–2011
Party name (in Norwegian)	Number of representatives
Labour Party (Arbeiderpartiet)	10
Centre Party (Senterpartiet)	6
Socialist Left Party (Sosialistisk Venstreparti)	1
Total number of members:	17

Hattfjelldal kommunestyre 2003–2007
Party name (in Norwegian)	Number of representatives
Labour Party (Arbeiderpartiet)	10
Socialist Left Party (Sosialistisk Venstreparti)	1
Joint list of the Conservative Party (Høyre), Christian Democratic Party (Kristelig Folkeparti), and Centre Party (Senterpartiet)	6
Total number of members:	17

Hattfjelldal kommunestyre 1999–2003
Party name (in Norwegian)	Number of representatives
Labour Party (Arbeiderpartiet)	8
Centre Party (Senterpartiet)	6
Socialist Left Party (Sosialistisk Venstreparti)	1
Joint list of the Conservative Party (Høyre), Christian Democratic Party (Kristelig Folkeparti), and Liberal Party (Venstre)	2
Total number of members:	17

Hattfjelldal kommunestyre 1995–1999
Party name (in Norwegian)	Number of representatives
Labour Party (Arbeiderpartiet)	7
Centre Party (Senterpartiet)	7
Socialist Left Party (Sosialistisk Venstreparti)	1
Joint list of the Conservative Party (Høyre), Christian Democratic Party (Kristelig Folkeparti), and Liberal Party (Venstre)	2
Total number of members:	17

Hattfjelldal kommunestyre 1991–1995
Party name (in Norwegian)	Number of representatives
Labour Party (Arbeiderpartiet)	9
Conservative Party (Høyre)	1
Centre Party (Senterpartiet)	5
Socialist Left Party (Sosialistisk Venstreparti)	2
Total number of members:	17

Hattfjelldal kommunestyre 1987–1991
Party name (in Norwegian)	Number of representatives
Labour Party (Arbeiderpartiet)	12
Socialist Left Party (Sosialistisk Venstreparti)	2
Joint list of the Conservative Party (Høyre), Christian Democratic Party (Kristelig Folkeparti), Centre Party (Senterpartiet), and Liberal Party (Venstre)	7
Total number of members:	21

Hattfjelldal kommunestyre 1983–1987
Party name (in Norwegian)	Number of representatives
Labour Party (Arbeiderpartiet)	11
Conservative Party (Høyre)	1
Christian Democratic Party (Kristelig Folkeparti)	1
Centre Party (Senterpartiet)	5
Socialist Left Party (Sosialistisk Venstreparti)	2
Liberal Party (Venstre)	1
Total number of members:	21

Hattfjelldal kommunestyre 1979–1983
Party name (in Norwegian)	Number of representatives
Labour Party (Arbeiderpartiet)	11
Conservative Party (Høyre)	1
Socialist Left Party (Sosialistisk Venstreparti)	1
Joint list of the Centre Party (Senterpartiet), Christian Democratic Party (Kristelig Folkeparti), and Liberal Party (Venstre)	8
Total number of members:	21

Hattfjelldal kommunestyre 1975–1979
Party name (in Norwegian)	Number of representatives
Labour Party (Arbeiderpartiet)	11
Christian Democratic Party (Kristelig Folkeparti)	1
Centre Party (Senterpartiet)	6
Socialist Left Party (Sosialistisk Venstreparti)	2
Liberal Party (Venstre)	1
Total number of members:	21

Hattfjelldal kommunestyre 1971–1975
Party name (in Norwegian)	Number of representatives
Labour Party (Arbeiderpartiet)	11
Centre Party (Senterpartiet)	6
Liberal Party (Venstre)	1
Local List(s) (Lokale lister)	2
Socialist common list (Venstresosialistiske felleslister)	1
Total number of members:	21

Hattfjelldal kommunestyre 1967–1971
Party name (in Norwegian)	Number of representatives
Labour Party (Arbeiderpartiet)	9
Centre Party (Senterpartiet)	5
Socialist People's Party (Sosialistisk Folkeparti)	1
Liberal Party (Venstre)	2
Total number of members:	17

Hattfjelldal kommunestyre 1963–1967
Party name (in Norwegian)	Number of representatives
Labour Party (Arbeiderpartiet)	11
Centre Party (Senterpartiet)	5
Liberal Party (Venstre)	1
Total number of members:	17

Hattfjelldal herredsstyre 1959–1963
Party name (in Norwegian)	Number of representatives
Labour Party (Arbeiderpartiet)	10
Centre Party (Senterpartiet)	4
Liberal Party (Venstre)	3
Total number of members:	17

Hattfjelldal herredsstyre 1955–1959
Party name (in Norwegian)	Number of representatives
Labour Party (Arbeiderpartiet)	10
Farmers' Party (Bondepartiet)	4
Liberal Party (Venstre)	3
Total number of members:	17

Hattfjelldal herredsstyre 1951–1955
Party name (in Norwegian)	Number of representatives
Labour Party (Arbeiderpartiet)	9
Farmers' Party (Bondepartiet)	4
Liberal Party (Venstre)	3
Total number of members:	16

Hattfjelldal herredsstyre 1947–1951
Party name (in Norwegian)	Number of representatives
Labour Party (Arbeiderpartiet)	9
Communist Party (Kommunistiske Parti)	1
Farmers' Party (Bondepartiet)	2
Liberal Party (Venstre)	4
Total number of members:	16

Hattfjelldal herredsstyre 1945–1947
Party name (in Norwegian)	Number of representatives
Labour Party (Arbeiderpartiet)	10
Farmers' Party (Bondepartiet)	1
Liberal Party (Venstre)	5
Total number of members:	16

Hattfjelldal herredsstyre 1937–1941*
Party name (in Norwegian)	Number of representatives
Labour Party (Arbeiderpartiet)	8
Farmers' Party (Bondepartiet)	2
Liberal Party (Venstre)	6
Total number of members:	16
Note: Due to the German occupation of Norway during World War II, no elections were held for new municipal councils until after the war ended in 1945.

=== Mayors ===
The mayor (Norwegian: ordfører) of Hattfjelldal Municipality is the political leader of the municipality and the chairperson of the municipal council. Here is a list of people who have held this position:

- 1862–1867: Claus Jacobsen Sørdal
- 1868–1870: Rev. Søren Schjelderup
- 1871–1872: Anders Jakobsen Varntresk
- 1873–1876: Rev. Th. Bræch
- 1877–1878: Andreas O. Nerli
- 1879–1883: Rev. H. Larsen
- 1885–1896: Rev. Ole Tobias Olsen
- 1897–1901: O. Hoff
- 1902–1913: Anton E. Lie
- 1913–1916: Peter Olsen Bolstad (Ap)
- 1917–1919: Olav Tustervatn
- 1920–1921: Olaf Nerli
- 1922–1924: Olav Tustervatn
- 1925–1937: Nordvald Sjaavik (Ap)
- 1937–1941: Bjarne Aaslid (Ap)
- 1942–1944: Erling Spro (NS)
- 1944–1945: Johan T. Haugen (NS)
- 1945–1955: Bjarne Aaslid (Ap)
- 1955–1970: Kasper Sæterstad (Ap)
- 1970–1983: Karl Ingebrigtsen (Ap)
- 1983–1991: Arne Steinbakken (Ap)
- 1991–1995: Herlaug Granås (Ap)
- 1995–1999: Terje Daleng (Sp)
- 1999–2015: Asgeir Almås (Ap)
- 2015–2023: Harald Lie (Sp)
- 2023–present: Sølvi Andersen (Ap)

== Notable people ==
- Kirsten Alnæs (1927–2021), a social anthropologist who was born in Hattfjelldal
- Anders K. Orvin (1889–1980), a geologist and explorer
- Anna Jacobsen (1924–2004), a champion of Southern Sami language and culture
- Karl Ingebrigtsen (born 1935), a Norwegian politician
