= Hattfjelldal (village) =

Village in Hattfjelldal Municipality, Norway

Hattfjelldal Hattfjelldal (Norwegian) Aarborte (Southern Sami)
- Village
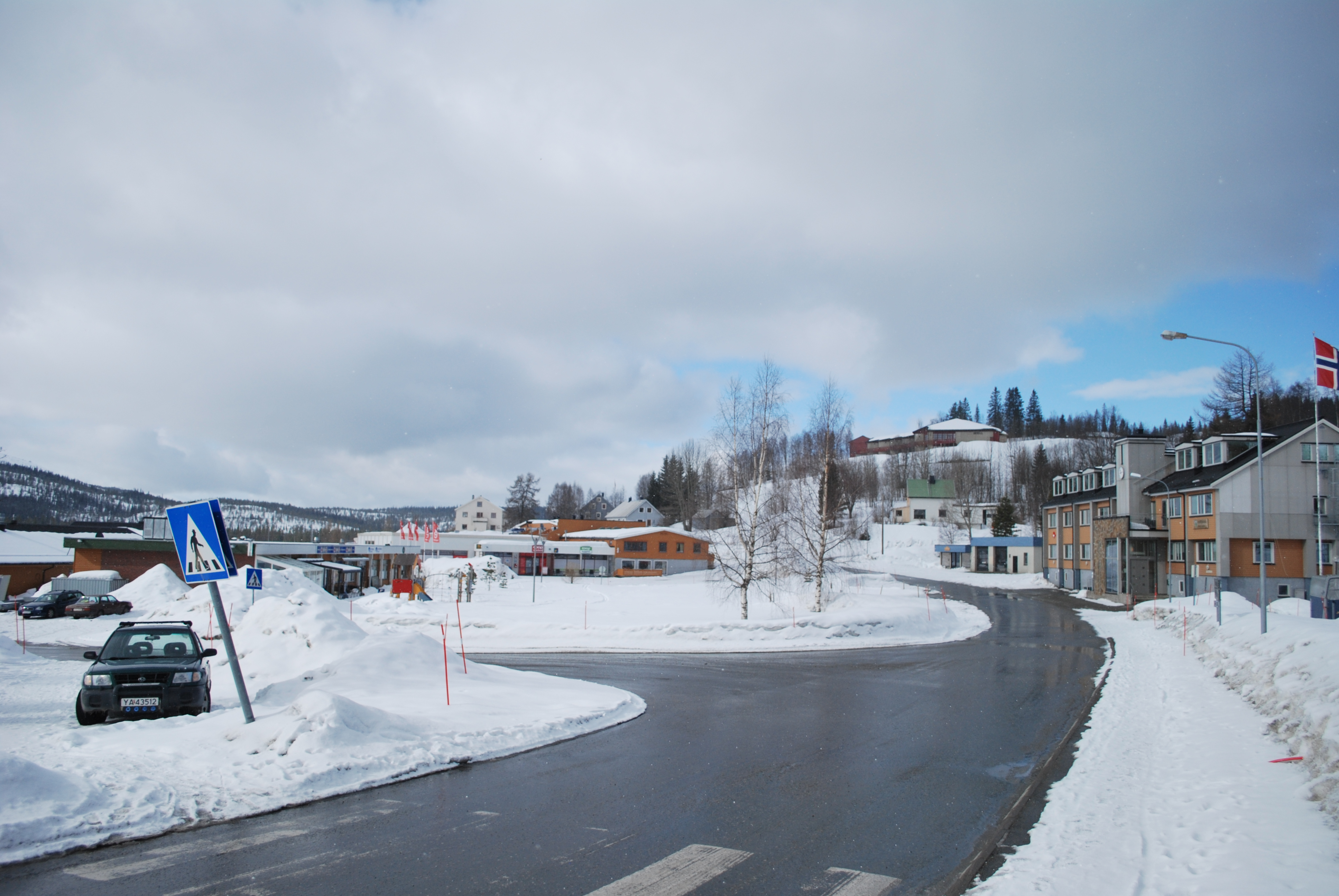
- View of the village
- Interactive map of Hattfjelldal
- Location within Nordland Location within Norway
- Coordinates: 65.5974°N 13.9879°E
- Country: Norway
- Region: Northern Norway
- County: Nordland
- District: Helgeland
- Municipality: Hattfjelldal Municipality

Area
  - Total: 0.86 km^{2} (0.33 sq mi)
- Elevation: 214 m (702 ft)

Population (2024)
  - Total: 542
  - Density: 630/km^{2} (1,600/sq mi)
- Time zone: UTC+01:00 (CET)
  - Summer (DST): UTC+02:00 (CEST)
- Post Code: 8690 Hattfjelldal

Hattfjelldal (Norwegian) or Aarborte (Southern Sami) is the administrative centre of Hattfjelldal Municipality in Nordland county, Norway. The village is located along the river Vefsna, about 25 kilometres (16 mi) west of the border with Sweden. The large lake Røsvatnet lies about 7 kilometres (4.3 mi) north of the village. The Norwegian National Road 73 runs through the village. The village of Svenskvollen lies about 25 kilometres (16 mi) to the south in the Susendalen valley. The village of Varntresk lies about 30 kilometres (19 mi) to the north.

The 0.86-square-kilometre (210-acre) village has a population (2024) of 542 and a population density of 630 inhabitants per square kilometre (1,600/sq mi).

Hattfjelldal Church and Hattfjelldal Airport are both located in the village. The headquarters for the company Arbor-Trading AS has been located in this village since 1957. The Southern Sami cultural centre, Sijti Jarnge, is located in the village as well.
