= Hattfjelldal Church =

Church in Nordland, Norway

- Hattfjelldal kirke
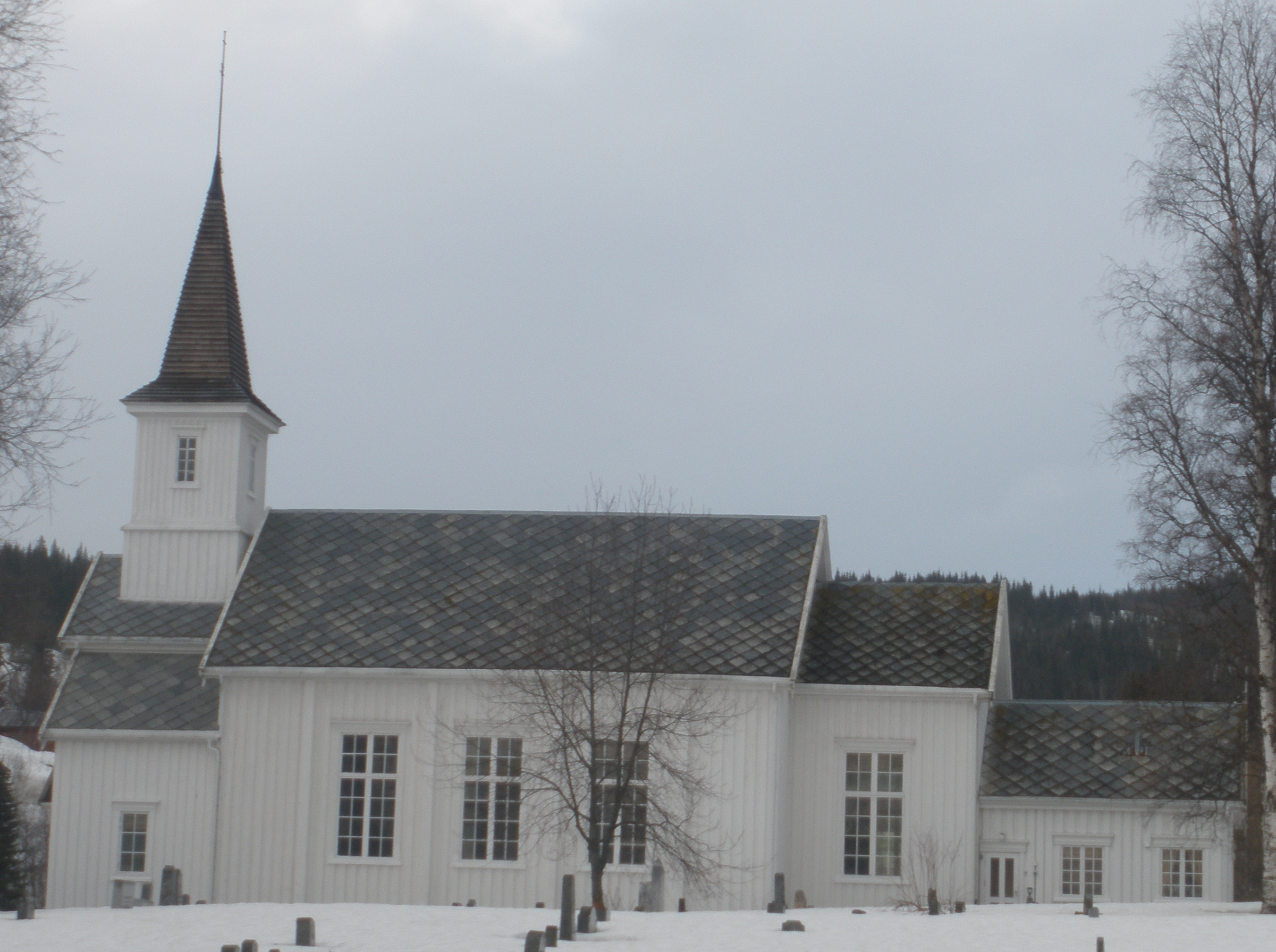
- View of the church
- Hattfjelldal Church
- 65.5970091°N 13.99182245°E
- Location: Hattfjelldal Municipality, Nordland
- Country: Norway
- Denomination: Church of Norway
- Churchmanship: Evangelical Lutheran

History
- Status: Parish church
- Founded: 1727
- Consecrated: 12 Aug 1869

Architecture
- Functional status: Active
- Architect: Jakob Nilsen Hagen
- Architectural type: Long church
- Completed: 1869 (157 years ago)

Specifications
- Capacity: 200
- Materials: Wood

Administration
- Diocese: Sør-Hålogaland
- Deanery: Indre Helgeland prosti
- Parish: Hattfjelldal
- Norwegian Cultural Heritage Site
- Type: Church
- Status: Not protected
- ID: 84495

Hattfjelldal Church (Norwegian: Hattfjelldal kirke) is a parish church of the Church of Norway in Hattfjelldal Municipality in Nordland county, Norway, located in the village of Hattfjelldal. It is the main church for the Hattfjelldal parish which is part of the Indre Helgeland prosti (deanery) in the Diocese of Sør-Hålogaland. The white, wooden church was built in a long church style in 1869 using plans drawn up by architect Jakob Nilsen Hagen. It seats some 200 people.

== History ==
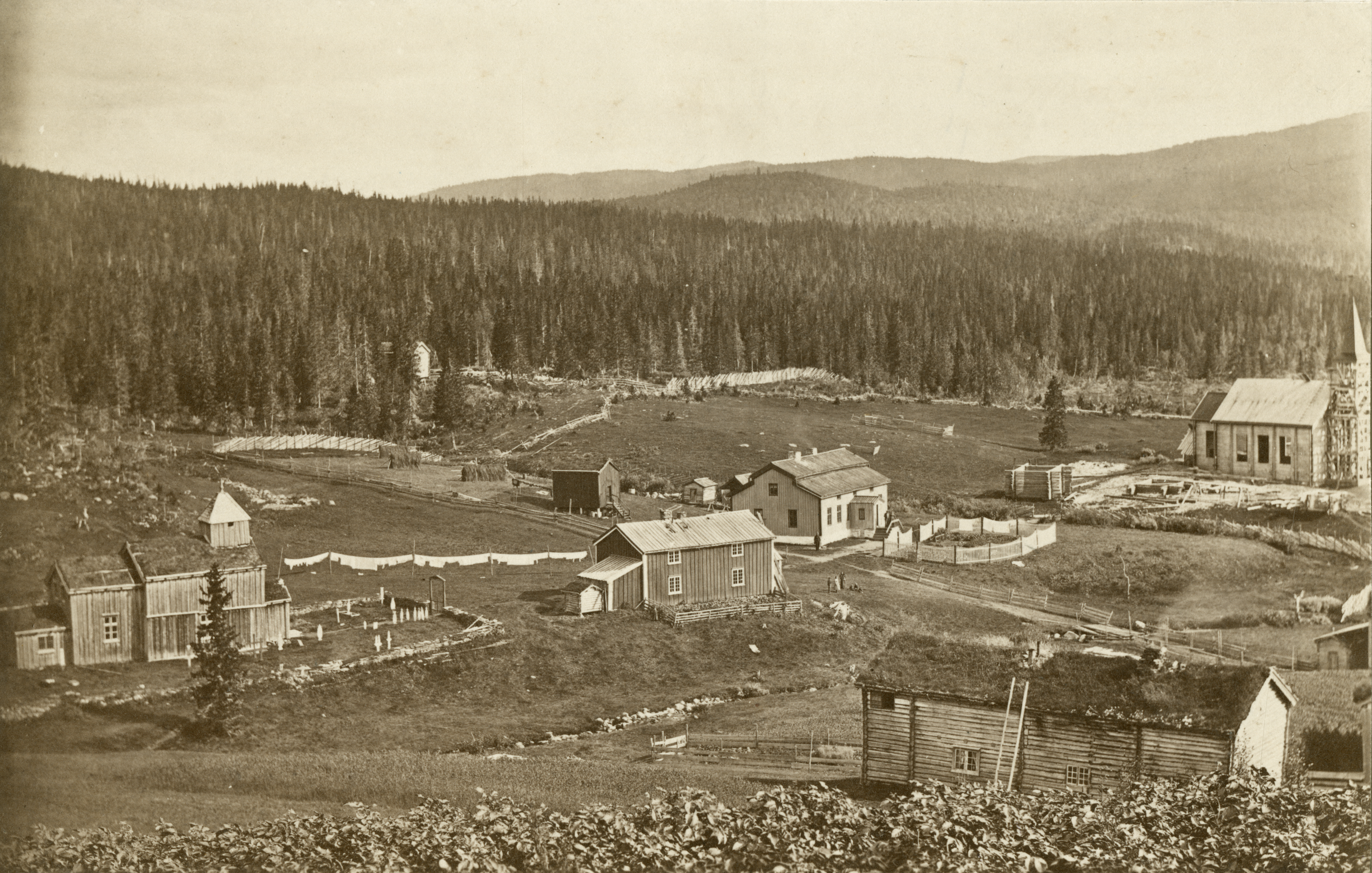
Photo from c. 1870. The new (present) church in the far right, while the old church (1788-1874) in the lower left.

The present church is the third church building on this site. The first small chapel was built in 1727. That one was replaced in 1788 by a larger chapel. The present church was constructed in 1868 on a plot of land a short distance to the north of the old church. The new building was consecrated on 12 August 1869 by Bishop Waldemar Hvoslef. The old church was torn down in 1874. The church was renovated in 1958, led by the architect John Egil Tverdahl. The architect Nils Toft renovated the sacristy in 1966.

== See also ==
- List of churches in Sør-Hålogaland
