= Kirsten Alnæs =

Norwegian social anthropologist (1927–2021)

- Born: Kirsten Elizabeth Alnæs; May 8, 1927; Hattfjelldal Municipality, Norway
- Died: February 4, 2021 (aged 93)
- Other names: Kirsten Alnaes, Kirsten Sommerfelt
- Occupation: Social anthropologist
- Known for: Namibian & Herero people studies, Religious cosmology

Kirsten Elisabeth Alnæs (also known as Kirsten Alnaes, Kirsten Sommerfelt) (May 8, 1927 - February 4, 2021) was a Norwegian social anthropologist.

Her academic education started at University of Oslo from 1951 to 1957 where she graduated with a B.A./M.A. in social anthropology.
During her academic years she spent three years (1957-1960) living among the Konzo in Uganda, she also did fieldwork in Botswana. She and her husband moved on to Rhodesia (now Zimbabwe) where they lived until they got expelled in 1966 alongside other academics. After her expulsion Alnæs moved to Tanzania where she worked as a research associate at University of Dar es Salaam from 1966 to 1968. She then moved on to London where she worked first at University College London as a research associate and later on took her PhD based on the research gathered during three fieldwork studies in Uganda (1958-1960, 1964, 1967) about the Konzolian cosmology Singing with the Spirits: A Study of Konzo Ritual and Song (1995).

Her work among the Herero people in Botswana was some of the first written accounts of survival after the Herero Wars in 1904-1908. Through audio tapes and interviews she was able to obtain first hand accounts from survivors that had been present in the genocides. Her work highlighted their struggles and how the memories of the war were kept alive through music and song.

In 1978 Alnæs published her first and only children's book Pio, for which she was awarded the debutant-award by the Norwegian Ministry of Culture and Equality.
The book has later been translated into both Danish and Swedish.

She was married to the anthropologist Axel Sommerfelt who she met while studying in Oslo, they have three children together.
