= Hattfjelldal Airport =

Hattfjelldal Airport Hattfjelldal flyplass
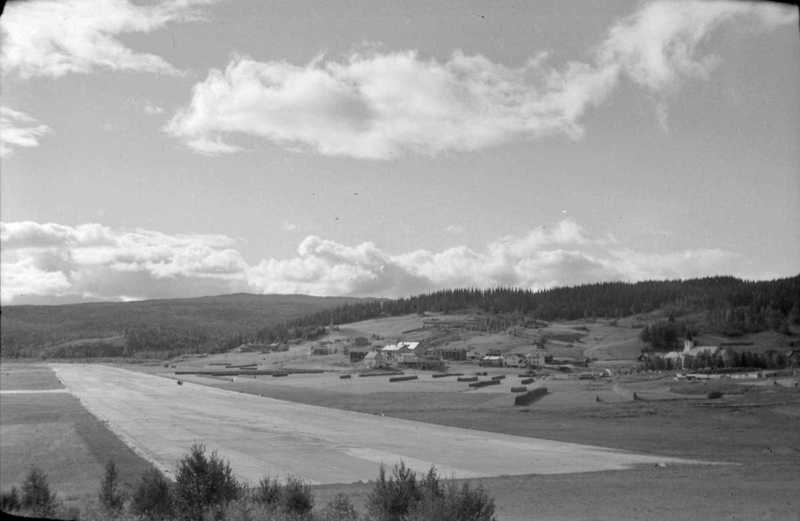
- The airport in 1948
- IATA: none; ICAO: ENHT

Summary
- Operator: Hattfjelldal Flyklubb
- Serves: Hattfjelldal, Norway
- Elevation AMSL: 210.3 m / 690 ft
- Coordinates: 65°35′42″N 13°59′24″E

Map

Runways
Direction	Length		Surface
Direction	m	ft	Surface
09–27	715	2,346	Concrete

Hattfjelldal Airport (Norwegian: Hattfjelldal flyplass) is a general aviation airport located in the village of Hattfjelldal, in Hattfjelldal Municipality in Nordland county, Norway. The first simple landing field was constructed in 1933. During World War II it was upgraded by the Luftwaffe to a 930-meter (3,050 ft) concrete runway and it served as a strategic airfield during the occupation of Norway, mostly for a stopovers. The concrete surface built by the Germans is still in use today and is operated by Hattfjelldal Flyklubb. There is no scheduled passenger traffic. The nearest such airports are Hemavan Airport and Mosjøen Airport.

== History ==
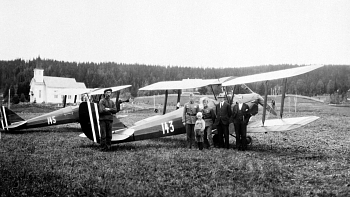
The opening of the airport in 1933

The airport was created as a simple landing field in 1933. With the break-out of World War II the airport was used by the Norwegian Army Air Service as a stop-over for flights heading to Northern Norway. After the German forces took control of the area in 1940 they immediately started construction of a wooden runway. More than a thousand people participated in the construction. This allowed them to use the airfield as a stopover for Junkers Ju 87s, especially for bombing raids during the Battles of Narvik. Throughout the war the airport saw daily landings of bombers in transit between Southern and Northern Norway.

To improve the airport, it was upgraded with a concrete runway, which was completed in 1943. Prior to the war the only structures at Hattfjelldal were a church and some farms. By the end of the war there were significant structures which had been built at and around the airport, which were taken over by the community and became the municipal hall, school and community center. A major employer, Arbor, established itself in the hangar during the 1950s.

An aviation club, Hattfjeldal flyklubb, was established in 1948. Activity was limited until 1960, when the club bought its first aircraft, an Auster Mark 5. With the assistance of the aviation club in Bodø, Hattfjelldal flyklubb was able to establish pilot's training for the first time in 1962. Training was conducted on Bodø's ski-equipped Piper Cub. Three of the four pupils passed their exams. The club crashed their Auster in Rana Municipality on 11 March 1963 and after that bought a Piper Super Cub, which could be equipped with wheels, skis and floats. Additional training commenced in 1972 with a leased Cessna 150, and later the same year the club bought a used Cessna 172. The latter crashed in Glomfjorden in 1975 and replaced by a new aircraft of the same type, which remains in use by the club. A third and final round of training was organized at Hattfjelldal in 1981.

== Facilities ==
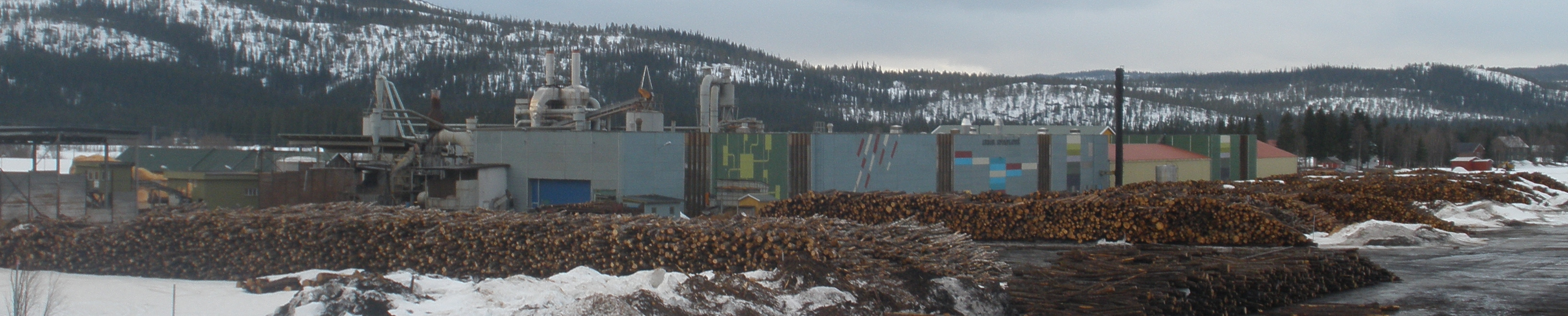
The Arbor chipboard plant at Hattfjelldal

.

The airport has a concrete runway which measures 930 by 50 meters (3,050 by 160 ft) and is 25 centimeters (9.8 in) thick. It remains the only unmodified airfield from the war, as all other airfields have either been demolished or modernized. The hangar at the airport is the site of Arbor, which uses part of the runway as a storage facilities for its output.
