= Vefsna =

River in Nordland, Norway

Vefsna (Norwegian) Vaapstenjeanoe (Southern Sami) Vapstälven (Swedish)
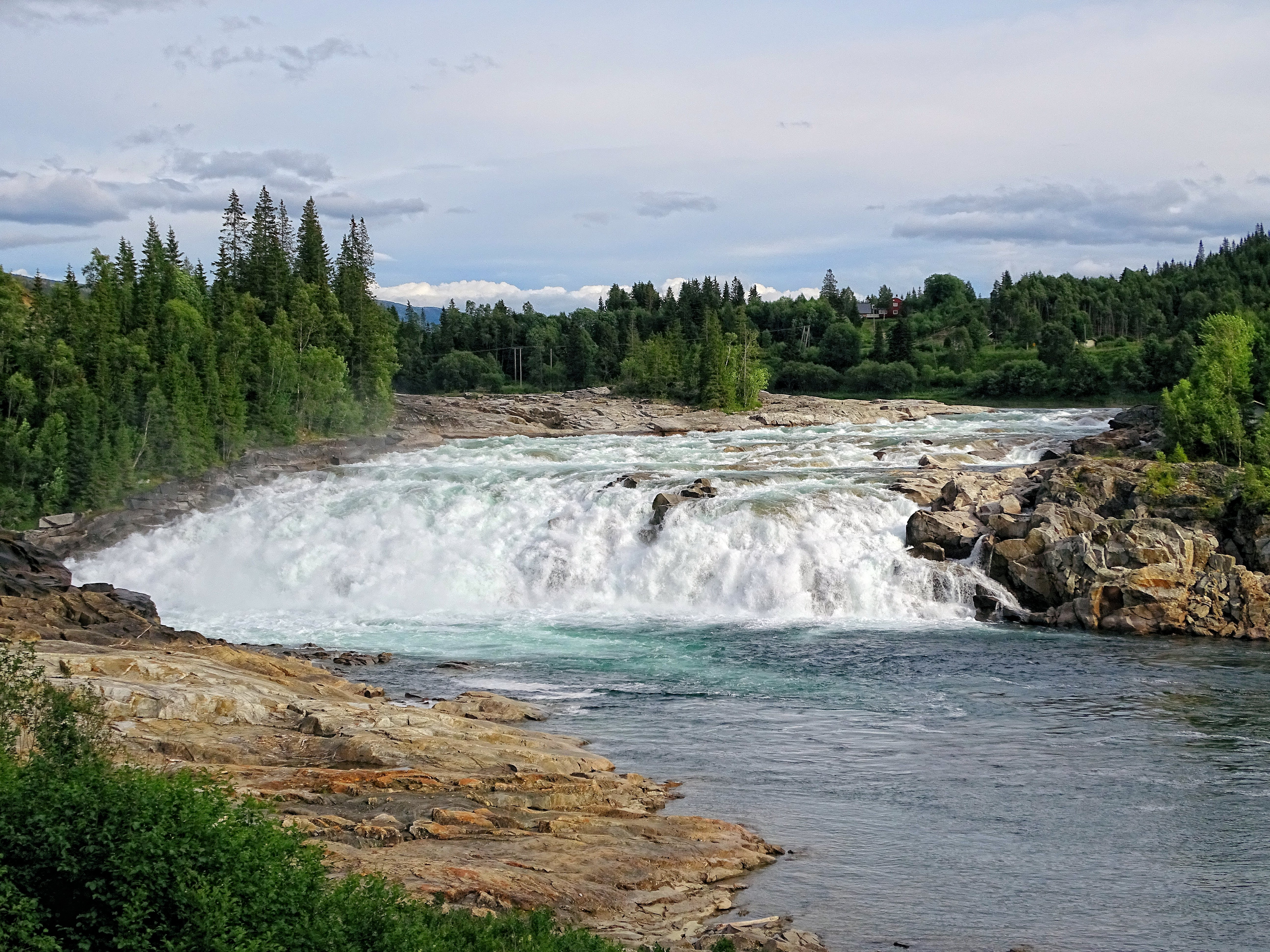
- The Laksforsen waterfall
- Interactive map of the river

Location
- Country: Norway
- County: Nordland
- Region: Helgeland
- Municipalities: Hattfjelldal Municipality; Vefsn Municipality; Grane Municipality

Physical characteristics
- Source: Simskardvatnet
  - location: Hattfjelldal Municipality, Nordland, Norway
  - coordinates: 65°16′59″N 13°48′51″E
  - elevation: 877 metres (2,877 ft)
- Mouth: Vefsnfjord, Mosjøen
  - location: Vefsn Municipality, Nordland, Norway
  - coordinates: 65°50′09″N 13°11′26″E
  - elevation: 0 metres (0 ft)
- Length: 163 km (101 mi)
- Basin size: 4,122 km^{2} (1,592 sq mi)

Basin features
- Tributaries
  - left: Svenningelva

Vefsna (Norwegian), Vaapstenjeanoe (Southern Sami), or Vapstälven (Swedish) is the largest river in Nordland county, Norway. It is 163 kilometres (101 mi) long and drains a watershed of 4,122 square kilometres (1,592 sq mi). Its headwaters lie in the mountains of Børgefjell National Park at the lake Simskardvatnet. The river runs through Hattfjelldal Municipality, Grane Municipality, and Vefsn Municipality. The southern parts of the river are sometimes called the river Susna. The river flows north, not far from the Swedish border, and some of the minor tributaries come from Sweden. At the town of Mosjøen, the river discharges into the Vefsnfjorden. The Laksforsen waterfall lies along its course.

Historically, it was an important salmon fishery, but it has now been infected with the salmon parasite Gyrodactylus salaris.

== Media gallery ==
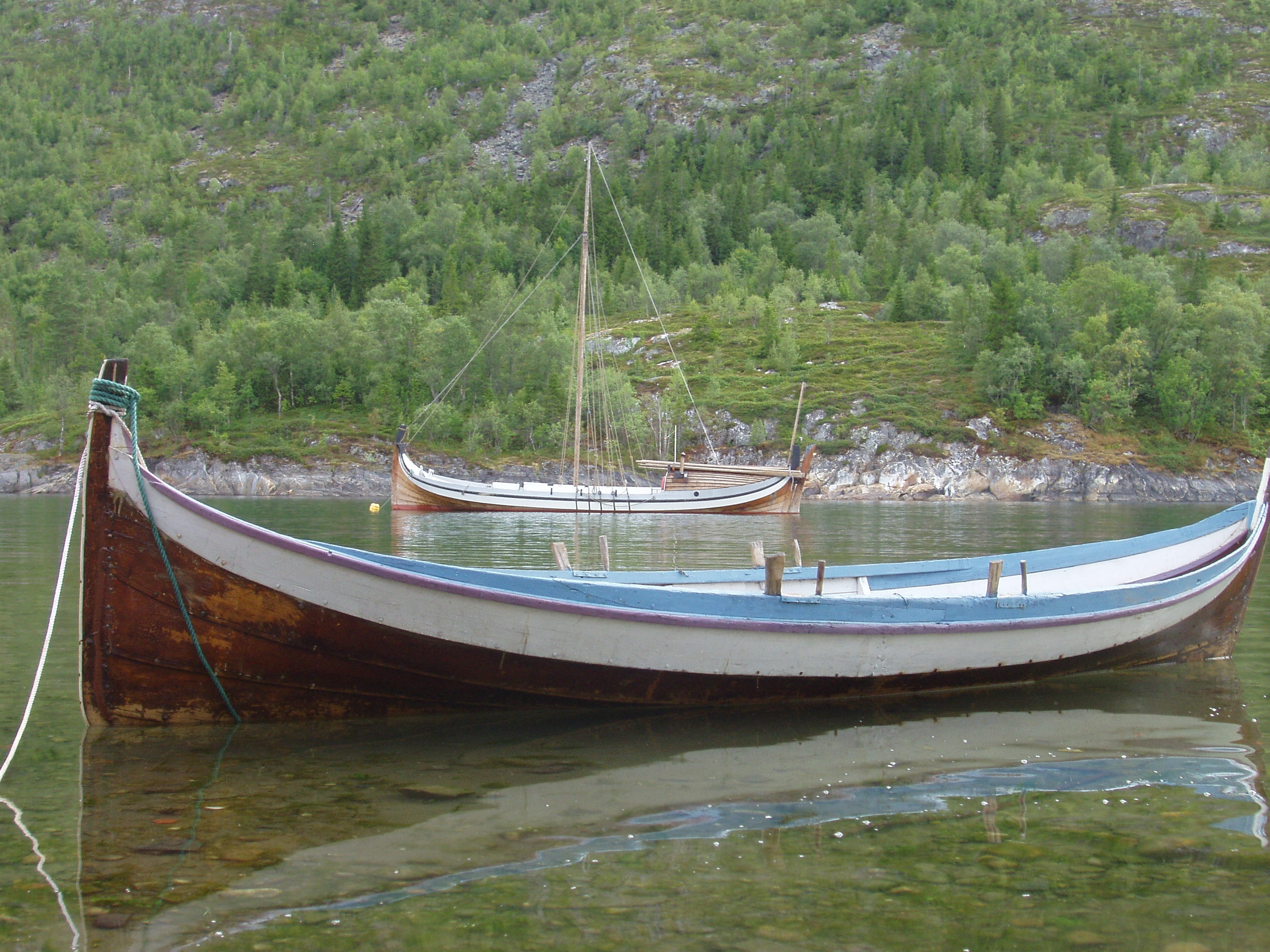
Nordlandsbåter on the Vefsna

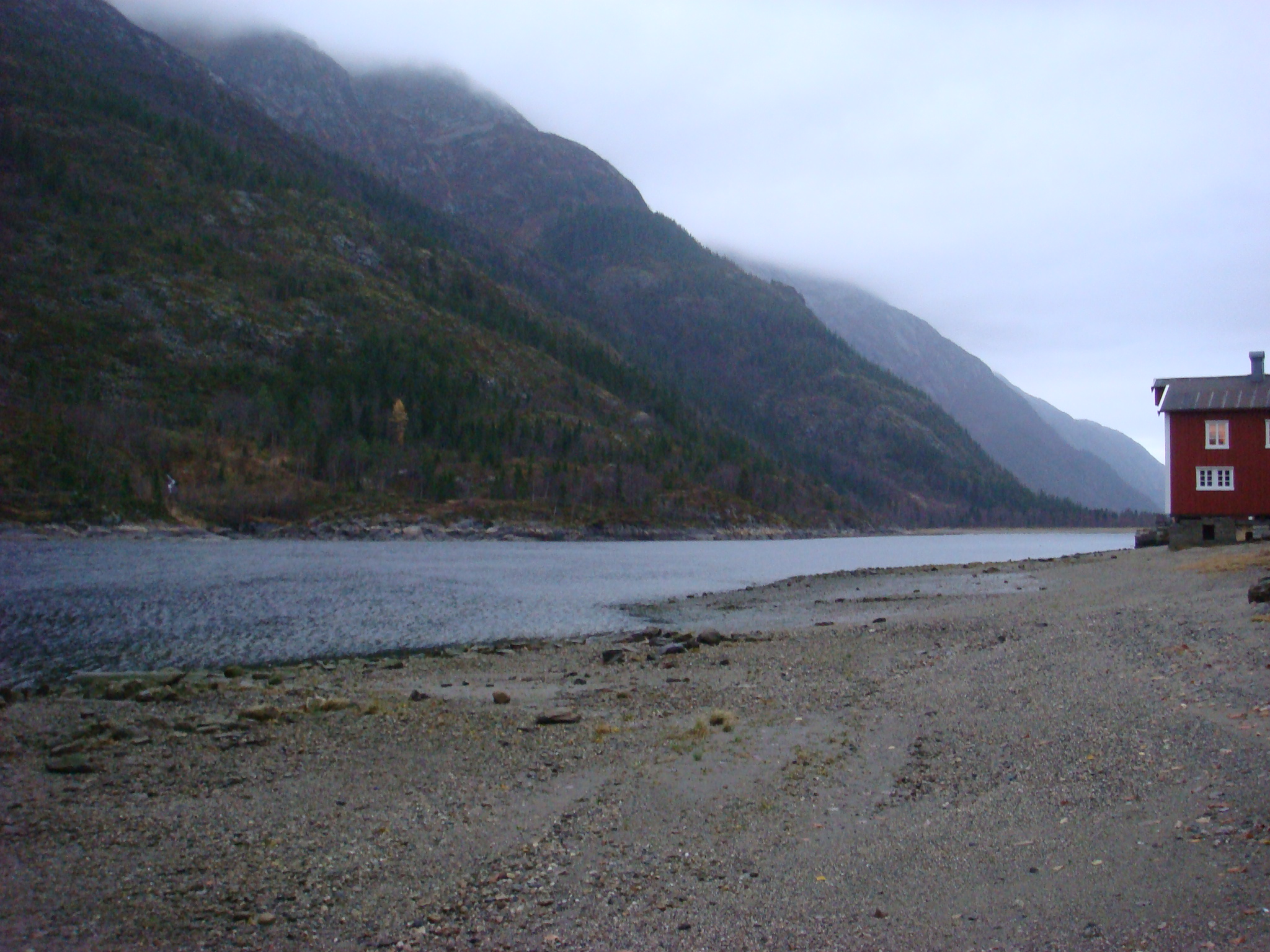

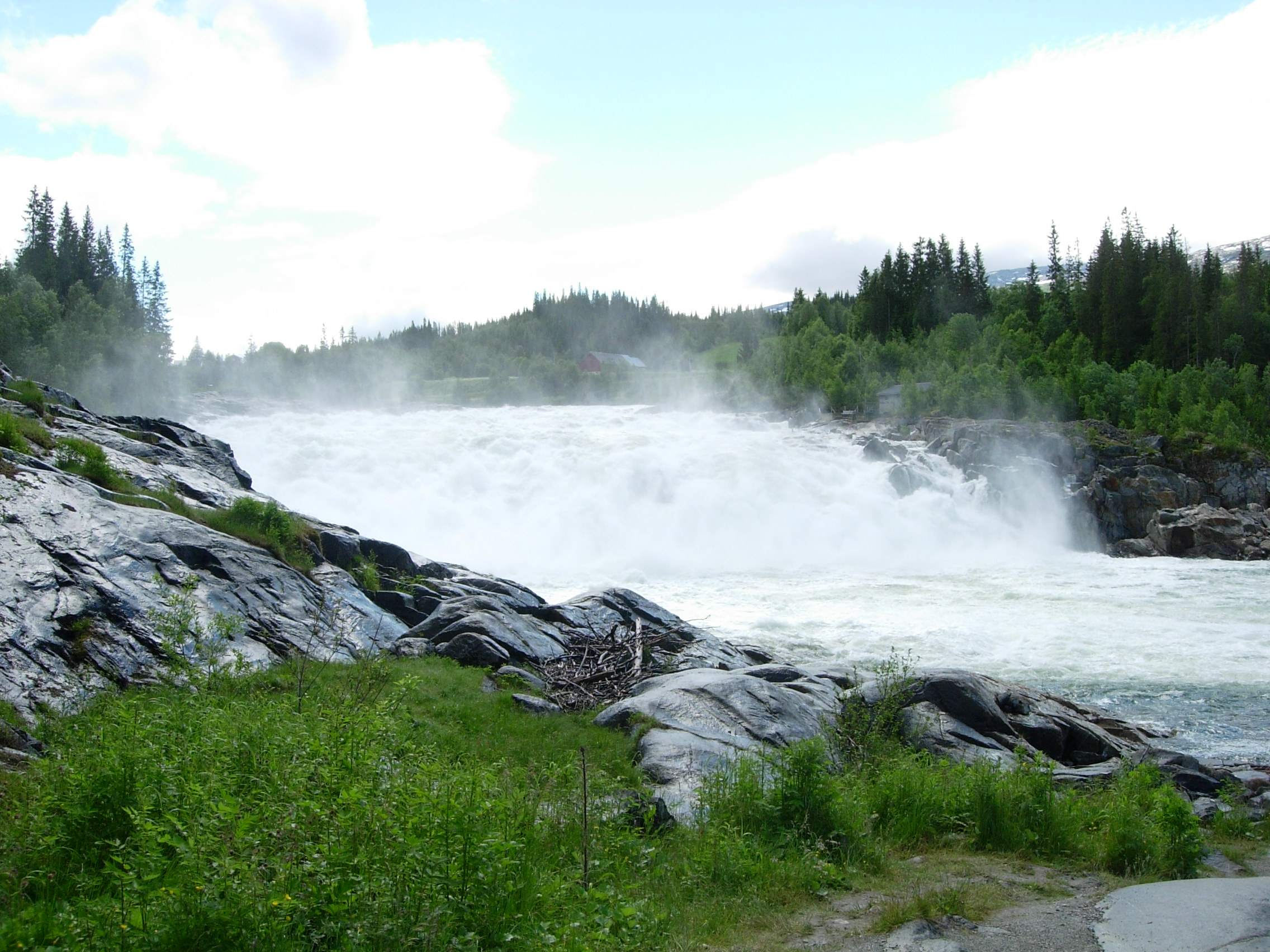

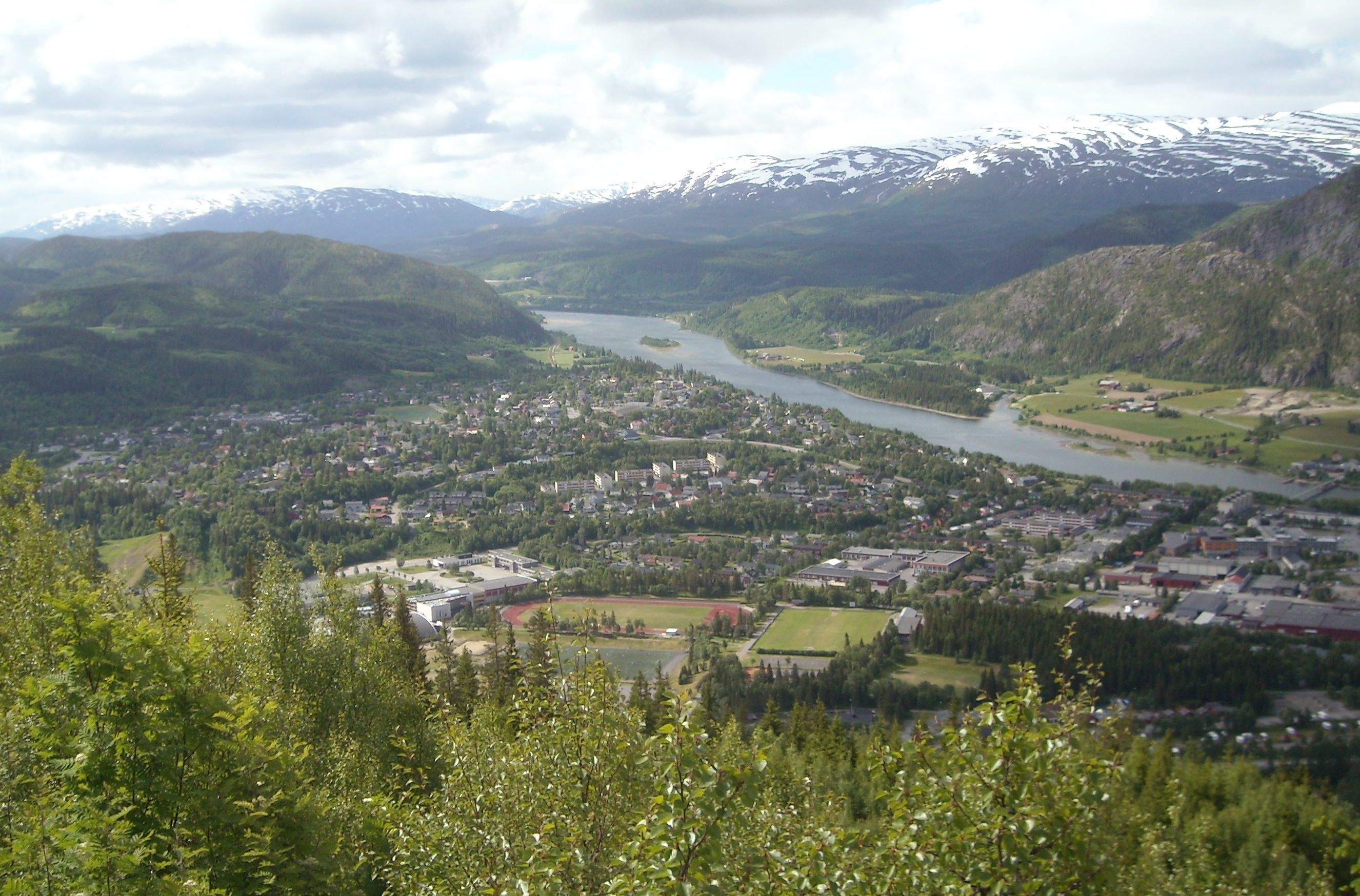

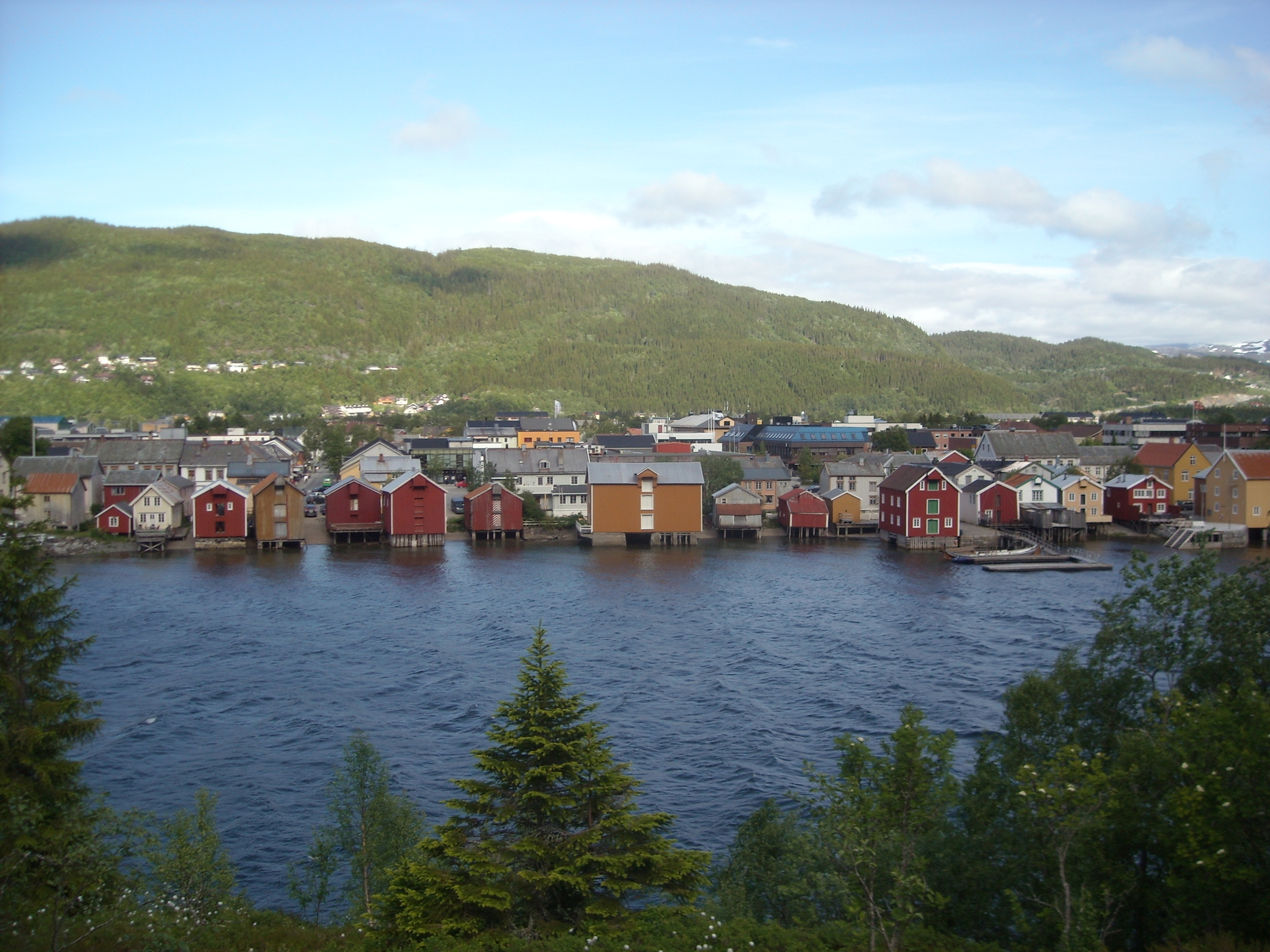

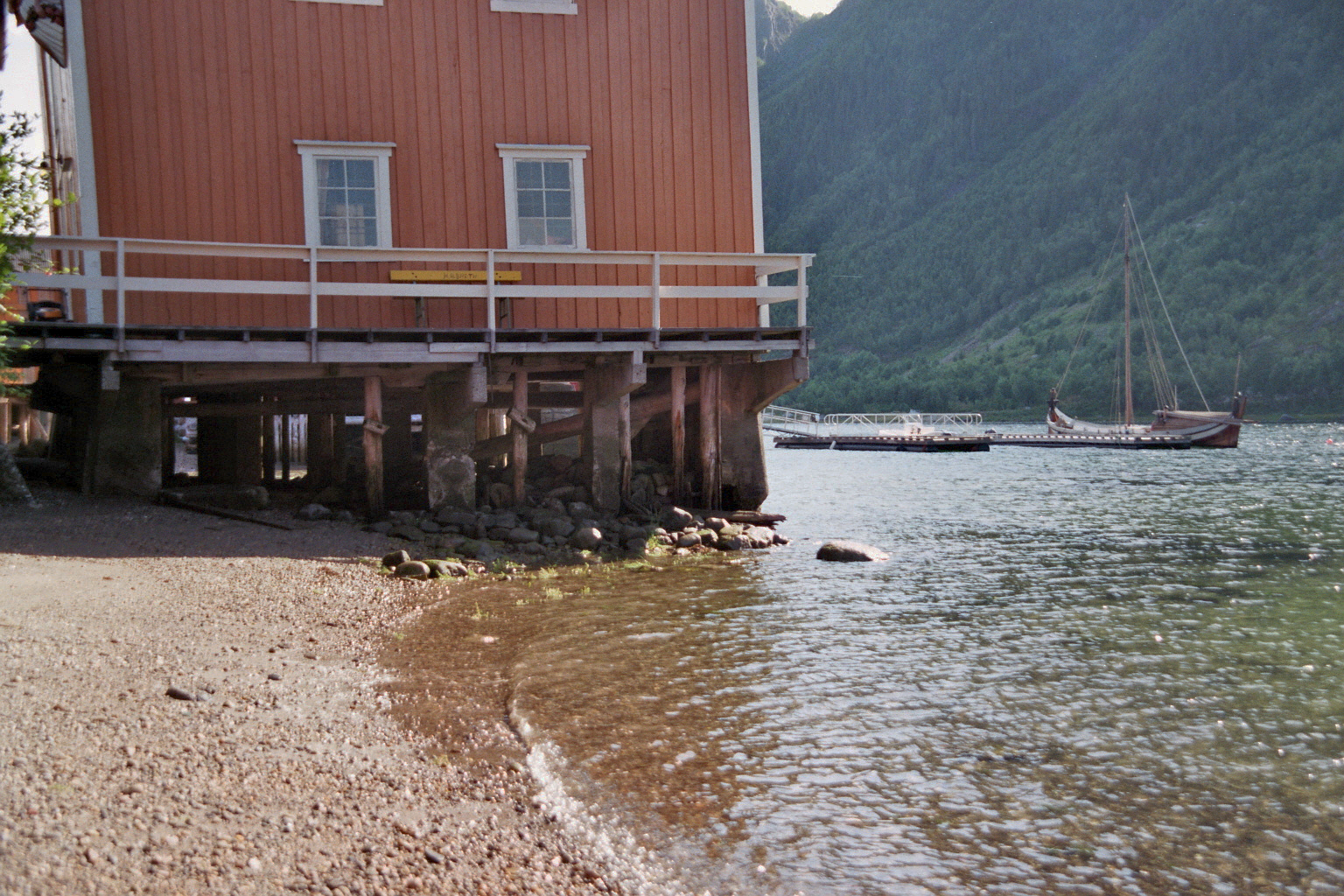

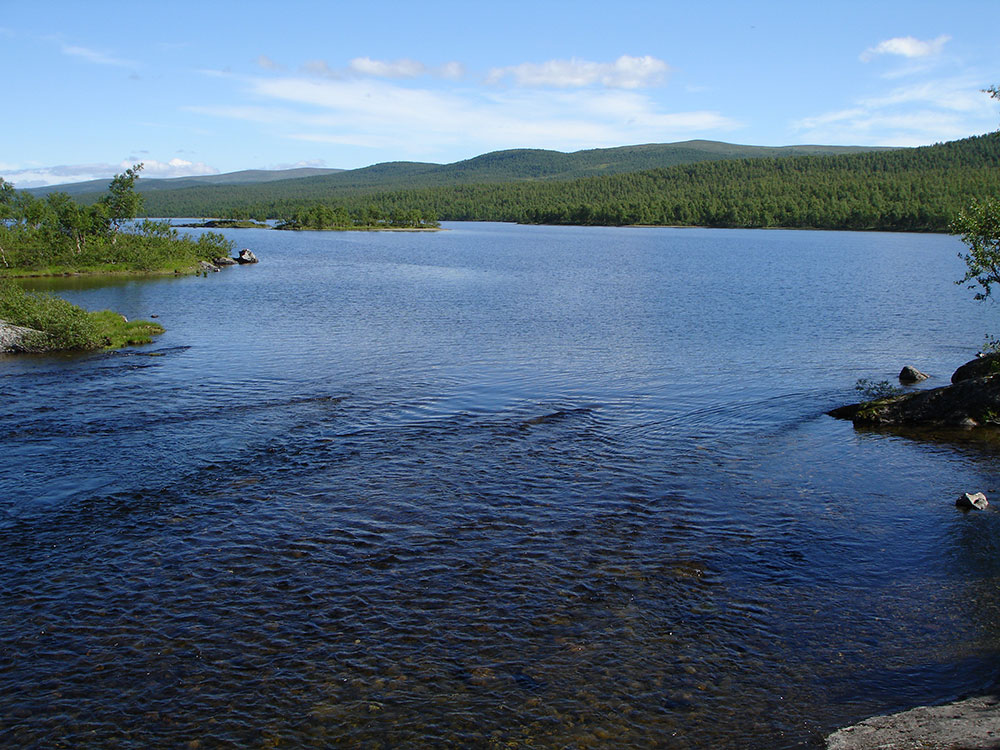

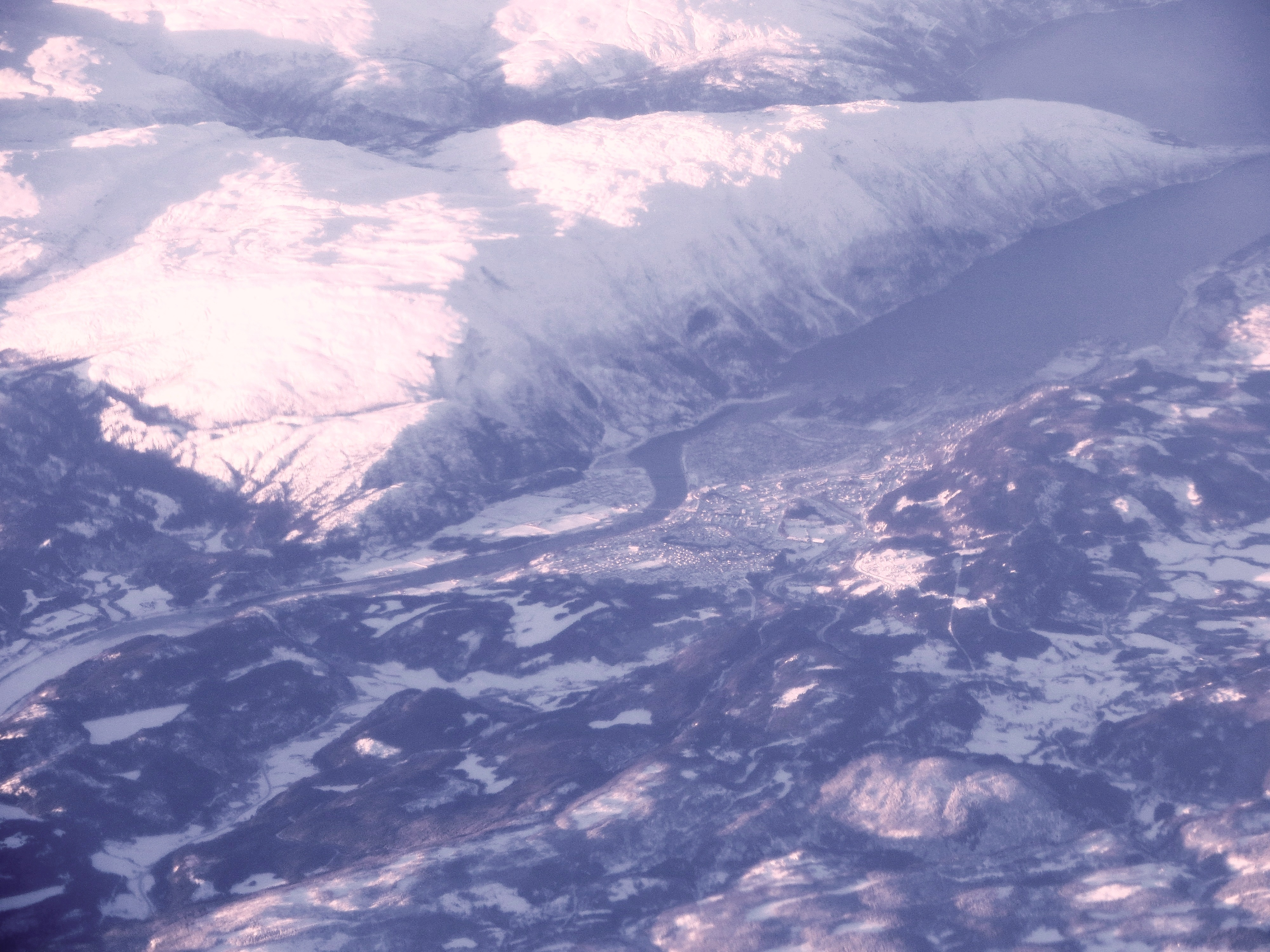

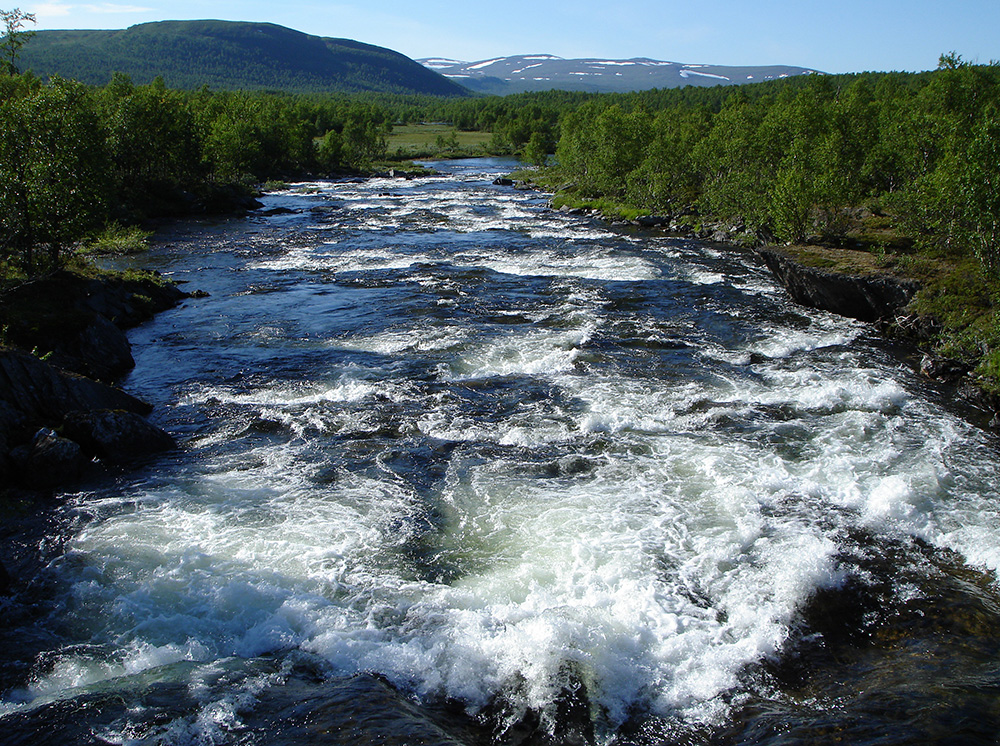

== See also ==
- List of rivers in Norway
