= Børgefjell National Park =

National park in Northern Norway

- IUCN category II (national park)
- Interactive map of Børgefjell National Park
- Location: Nordland and Trøndelag, Norway
- Nearest city: Mosjøen (north), Grong (south)
- Coordinates: 65°11′N 13°54′E
- Area: 1,447 km^{2} (559 sq mi)
- Established: 1963
- Governing body: Directorate for Nature Management

Børgefjell National Park (Norwegian: Børgefjell nasjonalpark, Southern Sami: Byrkije vaarjelimmiedajve) is an undeveloped national park in Norway, straddling the border between Trøndelag and Nordland counties, along the border with Sweden. The park is undeveloped with few trails or other facilities for visitors. Visitors can hike for extended periods without seeing another person. The 1,447-square-kilometre (559 sq mi) park was originally established in 1963, and it was enlarged in 1973 and 2003. It now includes land in the municipalities of Hattfjelldal, Grane, Namsskogan, and Røyrvik.

== Landscape ==
The landscape varies from dramatic peaks of dark granite and grey mountains with little vegetations, to fertile mountain slopes and marshes. The highest mountain peaks are in the west where the bedrock is primarily dark Børgefjell granite, which gives the landscape its desolate appearance. The highest mountain in the park, Kvigtinden, towering 1,699 metres (5,574 ft) above sea level, is found here. The 1,513-metre (4,964 ft) tall Jetnamsklumpen is the tallest mountain in Trøndelag, and is also located in the park. Other places, such as in the Rainesfjellet area, have rough stone screes without vegetation. Sub-glacial moraines cover much of the landscape. There are many lakes, ponds, and raging rivers.

== Flora and Fauna ==
Around 300 different species of plant can be found within the park. The tree line is around 500-600m above sea level. The majority of the forest consists of birch trees, but spruce and pine can also be found.

Børgefjell is best known as the home to the rare Arctic fox, although in terms of numbers the wolverine is the most common of the large predators. Both lynx and brown bear are also found here. The most common small predators are the red fox, the least weasel, the pine marten, and the stoat. It is also possible to catch the occasional glimpse of an otter.

All of Børgefjell is used for domestic reindeer grazing. The western, eastern, and southern parts of the national park are mainly used as grazing areas in the summer, while the northern areas are used for grazing all year round. Furthest east there are also reindeer coming in from Sweden.

Bird species present in the park include the willow and rock ptarmigan. Birds of prey are represented by the rough-legged buzzard, which is common in the park, and also the snowy owl and golden eagle.

== History ==
The Sami people controlled the land in Børgefjell right up until the beginning of the twentieth century. They have kept reindeer in the area for at least 500 years. Sami cultural monuments in the form of settlements and hunting stations can be found both inside the national park and in the border areas around it. The first farms in the area appeared at the end of the 1700s and beginning of the 1800s, and Norwegian settlement increased from then onwards. The first farms were established when there was a shortage of land elsewhere.

== Name ==
The first element seems to be the Old Norse word byrgi which means "fort" or "entrenchment". (There might have been some kind of fort here once, possibly to claim tax from the southern Sami people, and also to protect the border from the Swedes.) The last element is fjell which means "fell" or "mountain".
