= Røsvatnet =

Lake in Hattfjelldal and Hemnes, Nordland, Norway

Røsvatnet (Norwegian) Reevhtse (Southern Sami)
- Røssvatnet (Norwegian)
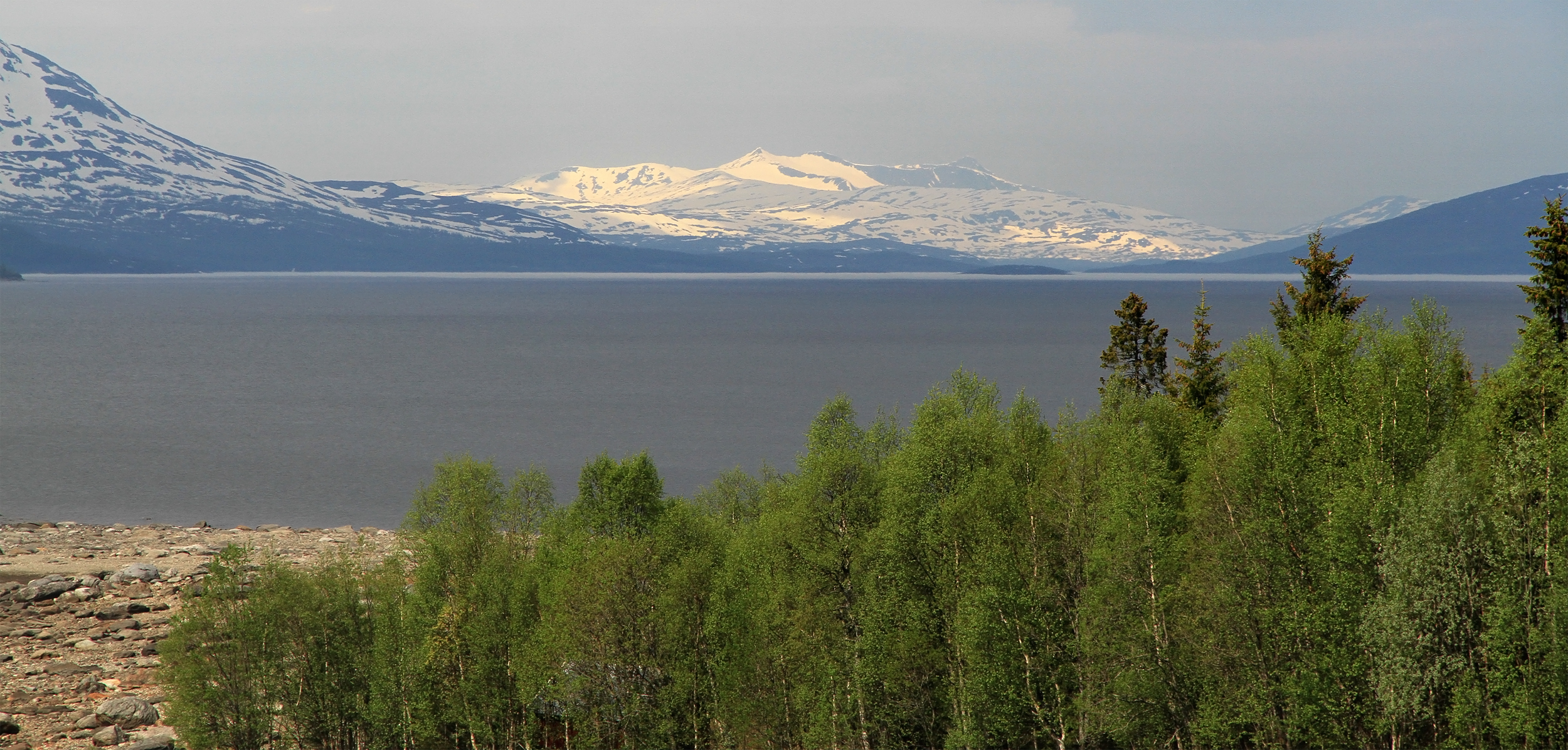
- Interactive map of the lake
- Location: Hemnes Municipality and Hattfjelldal Municipality, Nordland
- Coordinates: 65.7253°N 13.9739°E
- Type: dammed lake or reservoir
- Primary inflows: Bessedørelva, Bjørkåselva, Gåsvasselva, Hanskvasselva, Jierhtejohke, Krutåga, Laukskardelva, Leirelva, Lilleelva, Raudvasselva, Speelhtejohke, Steikvasselva, Stikkelvikelva, Storelva, Sørdalselva and Tvillelva
- Primary outflows: Røssåga
- Catchment area: 855 km^{2} (330 sq mi)
- Basin countries: Norway
- First flooded: 1957
- Max. length: 37 km (23 mi)
- Max. width: 18 km (11 mi)
- Surface area: 218.61 km^{2} (84.41 sq mi)
- Average depth: 68 metres (223 ft) (66.5 m before damming)
- Max. depth: 240 metres (790 ft) (231 m before damming)
- Water volume: 14.80 km^{3} (3.55 cu mi) (12.60 km^{3} before damming)
- Shore length^{1}: 256.37 km (159.30 mi)
- Surface elevation: 383 m (1,257 ft) (374 m before damming)
- Islands: Røssvassholmen
- References: NVE
- ^{1} Shore length is not a well-defined measure.

Røsvatnet (Norwegian) or Reevhtse (Southern Sami) is a lake and reservoir in Hattfjelldal Municipality and Hemnes Municipality in Nordland county, Norway. It has been the site of human occupation since the Stone Age. Its area of 219 square kilometres (85 sq mi) makes it the second largest lake in Norway by surface area. Without the dam which has regulated the lake since 1957, it would be 190 square kilometres (73 sq mi) and the third largest lake in Norway. Its depth is 240 metres (790 ft), its volume is estimated at 15 cubic kilometres (3.6 cu mi), and its surface elevation is 374 metres (1,227 ft) above sea level.

== Røssvassholmen ==
The 17.39-square-kilometre (6.71 sq mi) island Røssvassholmen is located in the southern part of the lake. it is the largest island in the lake. The highest point on the island reaches 206 metres (676 ft) above the lake's surface (at top regulation height). The island is Norway's second largest lake-island. The largest island within a lake in Norway is Helgøya, located within the lake Mjøsa.
