= Southern Sámi =

Endangered Uralic language of Scandinavia

- åarjelsaemien gïele, saemien gïele
- Region: Norway, Sweden
- Native speakers: (600 cited 1992)
- Language family: Uralic: Sámi; Western; Southwestern; Southern Sámi
- Writing system: Latin

Official status
- Official language in: Norway: Aarborte Municipality (Hattfjelldal); Raarvihke Municipality (Røyrvik); Snåase Municipality (Snåsa); Rosse Municipality (Røros)
- Recognised minority language in: Sweden

Language codes
- ISO 639-2: sma
- ISO 639-3: sma
- Glottolog: sout2674
- ELP: South Saami
- Southern Sami language area (red) within Sápmi (grey)

- South Saami is classified as Severely Endangered by the UNESCO Atlas of the World's Languages in Danger (2010)

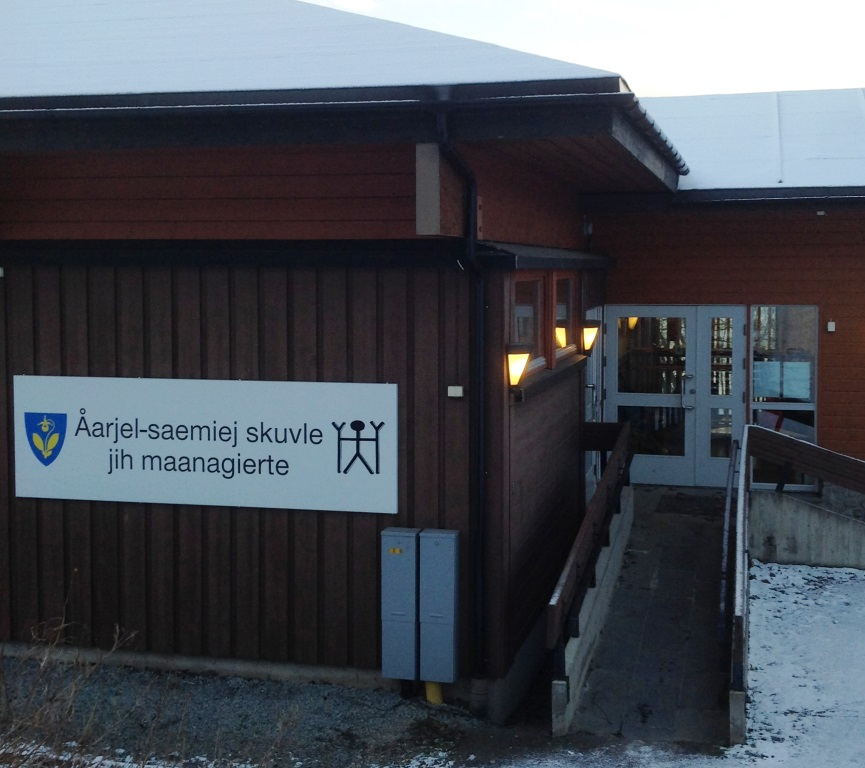
Åarjel-saemiej skuvle (Southern Sámi school) and maanagierte (kindergarten) in Snåase Municipality.

Southern Sámi or South Sámi (Southern Sami: åarjelsaemien gïele; Norwegian: sørsamisk; Swedish: sydsamiska) is the southwesternmost of the Sámi languages, and is spoken in Norway and Sweden. It is an endangered language. The designated main village of the language in Norway is Snåase Municipality (Snåsa) where the country's sole museum about Southern Sámi (Saemien sijte) and a long-running Southern Sámi primary school for Years 1 through 7 (Åarjel-saemiej skuvle). Other places of Southern Sámi culture in Norway are Aarborte Municipality (Hattfjelldal) in Nordlaante County (Nordland) and also in Raarvihke Municipality (Røyrvik), and Rosse Municipality (Røros), all of which are in Trööndelage County (Trøndelag). Out of an ethnic population of approximately 2,000, only about 500 still speak the language fluently. Southern Sámi belongs to the Saamic group within the Uralic language family.

In Sweden, Saami is one of five recognized minority languages, but the term "Saami" comprises different varieties/languages, and they are not individually recognized. In Norway, Southern Sámi is recognized as a minority language in its own right.

It is possible to study Southern Sámi at Nord University in Levanger Municipality, Umeå University in Umeå Municipality, and Uppsala University in Uppsala Municipality. In 2018, two master's degrees were written in the language at Umeå University. Language courses are also offered at different Sámi-language centres throughout the Southern Sámi area.

== Writing system ==
Southern Sámi is one of the eight Sámi languages that have an official written standard, but only a few books have been published for the language, one of which is an adequate-sized Southern Sámi–Norwegian dictionary. This language has had an official written form since 1978. The spelling is closely based on Swedish and Norwegian and uses the following Latin alphabet:

A a	B b	D d	E e	F f	G g	H h	I i
Ï ï	J j	K k	L l	M m	N n	O o	P p
R r	S s	T t	U u	V v	Y y	Æ æ	Ö ö
Å å

In 1976, the Sámi Language Council recommended the use of ⟨æ⟩ and ⟨ö⟩, but in practice the latter is replaced by ⟨ø⟩ in Norway and the former by ⟨ä⟩ in Sweden. This is in accordance with the usage in Norwegian and Swedish, based on computer or typewriter availability. The ⟨Ï ï⟩ represents a back version of ⟨I i⟩; however, many texts fail to distinguish between the two.

⟨C c⟩, ⟨Q q⟩, ⟨W w⟩, ⟨X x⟩, and ⟨Z z⟩ are only used in words of foreign origin.

Long sounds are represented with double letters for both vowels and consonants.

== Phonology ==
Southern Sámi has fifteen consonant and eleven vowel phonemes; there are six places of articulation for consonants and six manners of articulation.

There are also two dialects, northern and southern. The phonological differences are relatively small; the phonemic system of the northern dialect is explained below.

The typical word in Southern Sámi is disyllabic, containing a long stem vowel and ending in a vowel, as in the word /pa:ko/ 'word'. Function words are monosyllabic, as are the copula and the negative auxiliary. Stress is fixed and always word-initial. Words with more than three syllables are given secondary stress in the penultimate syllable.

=== Vowels ===
The eleven vowel phonemes comprise four phonologically short and long vowels (i-i:, e-e:, a-a:, u-u:) and three vowel phonemes which do not distinguish length (ø, æ, o).

The vowel phonemes of the northern dialect are the following; orthographic counterparts are given in italics:

	front		central		back
	unrounded	rounded	unrounded	rounded	back
close	i ⟨i⟩	y ⟨y⟩	ɨ ⟨ï⟩, ⟨i⟩ (Note: The distinction between the vowels /i/ and /ɨ/ is normally not indicated in spelling: both of these sounds are written with the letter ⟨i⟩. However, dictionaries and other linguistically precise sources use the character ⟨ï⟩ for the latter vowel.)	ʉ ⟨u⟩	u ⟨o⟩
mid	e ⟨e⟩, eː ⟨ee⟩	øː ⟨öö⟩			o ⟨å⟩, oː ⟨åå⟩
near-open	æ ⟨æ⟩, ⟨ä⟩, (Note: The spelling ⟨æ⟩ is used in Norway, and ⟨ä⟩ in Sweden.) ⟨ee⟩ (Note: Long /æː/ is written ⟨ee⟩.)				
open	aː ⟨ae⟩				ɑ ⟨a⟩, ɑː ⟨aa⟩

The non-high vowels /e/, /æ/, /o/, and /ɑ/ contrast in length: they may occur as both short and long. High vowels only occur short.

The vowels may combine to form ten different diphthongs:

	front	front to back	central to back	central to front	back to front	back
close to mid	/ie/ ⟨ie⟩	/yo/ ⟨yø⟩, ⟨yö⟩		/ʉe/ ⟨ue⟩; /ɨe/ ⟨ïe⟩, ⟨ie⟩		/uo/ ⟨oe⟩
close to open			/ʉɑ/ ⟨ua⟩			
mid					/oe/ ⟨øø⟩, ⟨öö⟩	
mid to open	/eæ/ ⟨ea⟩				/oæ/ ⟨åe⟩	/oɑ/ ⟨åa⟩

=== Consonants ===
In Southern Sámi, all consonants occur as geminates in word-medial position.

		Labial	Dental	Alveolar	Postalveolar	Palatal	Velar	Glottal
Nasal		m ⟨m⟩	n ⟨n⟩			ɲ ⟨nj⟩	ŋ ⟨ng⟩	
Plosive	unaspirated	p ⟨b⟩, ⟨p⟩	t ⟨d⟩, ⟨t⟩	ts ⟨ts⟩	tʃ ⟨tj⟩	c ⟨gi⟩, ⟨ki⟩	k ⟨g⟩, ⟨k⟩	
Plosive	aspirated	pʰ ⟨p⟩	tʰ ⟨t⟩			cʰ ⟨ki⟩	kʰ ⟨k⟩	
Fricative	voiceless	f ⟨f⟩		s ⟨s⟩	ʃ ⟨sj⟩			h ⟨h⟩
Fricative	voiced	v~ʋ ⟨v⟩						
Approximant		v~ʋ ⟨v⟩				j ⟨j⟩		
Lateral				l ⟨l⟩				
Trill				r ⟨r⟩				

== Grammar ==
=== Sound alternations ===
In Southern Sámi, the vowel in the second syllable of a word causes changes to the vowel in the first syllable, a feature called umlaut. The vowel in the second syllable can change depending on the inflectional ending being attached, and the vowel in the first vowel will likewise alternate accordingly. Often there are three different vowels that alternate with each other in the paradigm of a single word, for example as follows:

- ⟨ae⟩ ~ ⟨aa⟩ ~ ⟨ee⟩: vaedtsedh 'to walk' : vaadtsam 'I walk' : veedtsim 'I walked'
- ⟨ue⟩ ~ ⟨ua⟩ ~ ⟨öö⟩: vuelkedh 'to leave' : vualkam 'I leave' : vöölkim 'I left'

The following table gives a full overview of the alternations:

Proto-Samic first vowel	Followed by *ā	Followed by *ē	Followed by *ō	Followed by *ë	Followed by *i
*ā	aa	ae	aa	aa	ee
*ea	ea	ie	ea	aa	ee
*ie	ea	ie	ea	ïe	ie
*oa	åa	åe	åa	oe	öö
*uo	ua	ue	åa	oe	öö
*ë	a	e	æ, å	a, ï	e
*i	æ, ij	i	æ	ïj	i
*o	å	u	å, a	o, a, ov	u
*u	å, a	u	å	o, ov	u

On the other hand, Southern Sámi is the only Sami language that does not have consonant gradation. Hence, consonants in the middle of words never alternate in Southern Sámi, even though such alternations are frequent in its relatives. Compare, for instance, Southern Sámi nomme 'name' : nommesne 'in the name' to Northern Sámi namma : namas, with the consonant gradation mm : m.

=== Cases ===
Southern Sámi has eight cases:

Case (kaasuse)	Singular (aktentaale)	Plural (gellientaale)
Nominative (nominatijve)	—	-h
Accusative (akkusatijve)	-m	-i·te; -i·die; -j·te
Genitive (genitijve)	-n	-i; -j
Illative (illatijve)	-se; -sse; -n	-i·te; -i·die; -j·te
Inessive (inessijve)	-sne; -snie	-i·ne; -i·nie; -j·ne
Elative (elatijve)	-ste; -stie	-i·ste; -i·stie; -j·ste
Comitative (komitatijve)	-i·ne; -i·nie; -j·ne	-i·gujmie; -j·gujmie
Essive (essijve)	—	-i·ne; -i·nie; -j·ne

== Morphology ==
=== Nouns ===
Southern Sámi nouns inflect for singular and plural and have eight cases: nominative, accusative, genitive, illative, locative, elative, comitative, and essive, but number is not distinguished in the essive. Inflection is essentially agglutinative, but the case endings are not always the same in the plural and in the singular. The plural marker is -h in the nominative case, otherwise -i/j-, to which the case endings are added. There are five different inflection classes but no declension classes. All nouns take the same case markers.

The function of the nominative is to mark the subject, and the accusative marks the object. The nominative plural can also be used to mark plural (direct) objects, a feature called differential object marking, and here the noun gets an indefinite reading, while the accusative plural marks definite direct objects. The genitive is used in adnominal possession and marks the dependent of postpositions. The illative is a spatial case marking the recipient; while the locative and elative are also spatial cases, the locative is additionally used in existential constructions and the elative in partitive constructions. The comitative expresses participation and instrument, and the essive marks a state or a function.

Four stem classes can be distinguished: ie-stems, e-stems, a-stems, and oe-stems.

An overview of the modern inflection of guelie 'fish':

	Nominative	Genitive	Accusative	Illative	Locative	Ablative	Comitative	Essive
Singular	guelie	guelien	gueliem	gualan	guelesne	gueleste	gueline	gueline
Plural	guelieh	gueliej	guelide	guelide	gueline	guelijste	gueliejgujmie	-

Earlier, in the comitative singular and in the plural, besides the nominative i, umlaut of the root vowel to öö took place: Gen. Pl. göölij etc.

=== Pronouns ===
Personal pronouns inflect for three numbers (singular, dual, and plural) and seven cases (all of the above with the exception of the essive). A demonstrative pronoun without specific deictic bias is employed as the third-person pronoun, treating dual and plural forms as indistinguishable. Additional pronouns encompass pronominal and adnominal demonstratives, along with interrogative and relative pronouns, reflexive, logophoric, reciprocal, and a variety of indefinite pronouns. The majority of these pronouns change based on whether they refer to a singular or plural entity, and some also adapt to different cases. Demonstratives distinguish between three degrees of distance relative to the speaker.

Southern Sámi personal pronouns:
Person	Singular	Dual	Plural
1	manne	monnah	mijjieh
2	datne	dotnah	dijjieh
3	dihte	dah	dah

=== Verbs ===
Southern Sámi verbs inflect for person (first, second, and third) and number (singular, dual, and plural, where dual is an optional category). There are also two finite inflectional categories, the present and the past tense. Subject suffixes are the same across the tenses, and there are three different inflectional classes based on the thematic vowels and their behaviour in inflection. Furthermore, there are 4 non-finite forms: the perfect participle, the progressive, the infinitive, and the connegative and imperative form. Meanwhile, verbs express the TAM categories present indicative, past indicative, perfect, pluperfect, progressive, and imperative. The copula also inflects for the conditional.

In the verbum, a distinction must be made between odd-syllable and even-syllable verbs; in the latter, there are six different stem classes.

An overview of the forms of the ie stems using the example of båetedh 'to come':

	Present	Past	Imperative
1SG	båatam	böötim	N/A
2SG	båatah	böötih	båetieh
3SG	båata	bööti	N/A
1DU	båetien	böötimen	N/A
2DU	båeteden	böötiden	båeteden
3DU	båetiejægan	böötigan	N/A
1PL	båetebe	böötimh	N/A
2PL	båetede	böötidh	båetede
3PL	båetieh	böötin	N/A
Participle	båetije	båateme	N/A
Negative Form	båetieh	Gerund	båetieminie
Infinitive	båetedh	Verbal noun	båeteme

=== Adjectives ===
The morphology of adjectives is restricted to comparative and superlative forms. Some have different forms in attributive and predicative position, but most are invariable.

==== Person ====
Southern Sámi verbs conjugate for three grammatical persons:

- first person
- second person
- third person

==== Grammatical number ====
Southern Sámi verbs conjugate for three grammatical numbers:

- singular
- dual
- plural

==== Negative verb ====
Southern Sámi, like Finnish and the other Sámi languages, has a negative verb. In Southern Sámi, the negative verb conjugates according to tense (past and non-past), mood (indicative and imperative), person (first, second, and third), and number (singular, dual, and plural). This differs from some other Sámi languages, e.g. Northern Sámi, which do not conjugate according to tense.

Southern Sámi negative verb, indicative forms
	Non-past indicative			Past indicative		
	Singular	Dual	Plural	Singular	Dual	Plural
First	im	ean	ibie	idtjim	idtjimen	idtjimh
Second	ih	idien	idie	idtjih	idtjiden	idtjidh
Third	ij	eakan	eah	idtji	idtjigan	idtjin

Southern Sámi negative verb, imperative forms
	Non-past imperative			Past imperative		
	Singular	Dual	Plural	Singular	Dual	Plural
1st	aelliem	aellien	aellebe	ollem	ollen	ollebe
2nd	aellieh	aelleden	aellede	ollh	olleden	ollede
3rd	aellis	aellis	aellis	olles	olles	olles

== Syntax ==
Like Skolt Sámi and unlike other Sámi languages, Southern Sámi has preserved the basic structure SOV (Subject-Object-Verb). Only the copula ('to be') and auxiliary verbs appear second. The case-alignment system is nominative-accusative. However, plural objects are also sometimes marked with the nominative. Objects in the nominative plural get an indefinite reading, while objects in the accusative plural are definite. This applies for nouns as well as pronouns. An example of a plural object in the nominative:

dellie manne naarra-h tjeegk-i-m
then 1.SG.NOM snare-NOM.PL set.up-PST-1SG
"Then I set up snares."

Subject and agent are always marked identically, while the marking of the object depends on definiteness.

Different marking strategies
Subject	Object	Reading of object
NOM	ACC.SG	definite or indefinite
NOM	ACC.PL	definite
NOM	NOM.PL	indefinite

The verb agrees with the subject in person and number. The TAM categories mentioned above are based on non-finite verb forms and are expressed in periphrastic constructions with an auxiliary. The subject agrees with the auxiliary, but it is not obligatory. It is either marked on the pronoun or inferred from context. The imperative second singular uses the same non-finite irrealis form also used in negation constructions.

Verbal Agreement
	Verb form	Auxiliary	Agreement
present	finite	–	person/number
past	finite	–	person/number
imperative	non-finite	–	2SG
perfect	non-finite	yes-PRS	person/number with AUX
pluperfect	non-finite	yes-PST	person/number with AUX
progressive	non-finite	yes-PRS	person/number with AUX
past progressive	non-finite	yes-PST	person/number with AUX

Southern Sámi has some features that separate the language from its closest relatives, like SOV instead of SVO as basic constituent order, no stem gradation, and a genitive possessive. Nevertheless, most features of Southern Sámi are commonly found in other Uralic languages.
