= Røyrvik =

Røyrvik may refer to:

== Places ==
- Røyrvik Municipality, a municipality in Trøndelag county, Norway
- Røyrvik (village), a village in Røyrvik Municipality in Trøndelag county, Norway
- Røyrvik Church, a church in Røyrvik Municipality in Trøndelag county, Norway

== Other ==
- Røyrvik IL, a sports club based in Røyrvik Municipality in Trøndelag county, Norway
- Røyrvik Power Station, a hydroelectric power station in Gloppen Municipality in Vestland county, Norway

== See also ==
- Rørvik
