= Storgollomsvatnet =

Lake in Trøndelag, Norway

Storgollomsvatnet (Norwegian) Golmesjaevrieh (Southern Sami)
- Interactive map of the lake
- Location: Røyrvik Municipality, Trøndelag
- Coordinates: 64.9706°N 13.6716°E
- Primary outflows: Namsvatnet
- Basin countries: Norway
- Max. length: 3.5 kilometres (2.2 mi)
- Max. width: 3 kilometres (1.9 mi)
- Surface area: 5.3 km^{2} (2.0 sq mi)
- Shore length^{1}: 30 kilometres (19 mi)
- Surface elevation: 473 metres (1,552 ft)
- References: NVE
- ^{1} Shore length is not a well-defined measure.

Storgollomsvatnet (Norwegian) or Golmesjaevrieh (Southern Sami) is a lake in Røyrvik Municipality in Trøndelag county, Norway. The 5.3-square-kilometre (2.0 sq mi) lake lies just south of the large lake Namsvatnet into which it drains.

== See also ==
- List of lakes in Norway
