= Tunnsjøflyan =

Lake in Trøndelag, Norway

- Interactive map of the lake
- Location: Røyrvik Municipality and Namsskogan Municipality, Trøndelag
- Coordinates: 64.6858°N 13.0971°E
- Basin countries: Norway
- Max. length: 7 kilometres (4.3 mi)
- Max. width: 2.5 kilometres (1.6 mi)
- Surface area: 7.12 km^{2} (2.75 sq mi)
- Shore length^{1}: 46 kilometres (29 mi)
- Surface elevation: 348 metres (1,142 ft)
- References: NVE
- ^{1} Shore length is not a well-defined measure.

Tunnsjøflyan is a lake in Røyrvik Municipality (and partially in Namsskogan Municipality) in Trøndelag County, Norway. The 7.12-square-kilometre (2.75 sq mi) lake drains out into Tunnsjøen to the east.

== See also ==
- List of lakes in Norway
- Tunnsjødal Hydroelectric Power Station
