= Lakes in Norway =

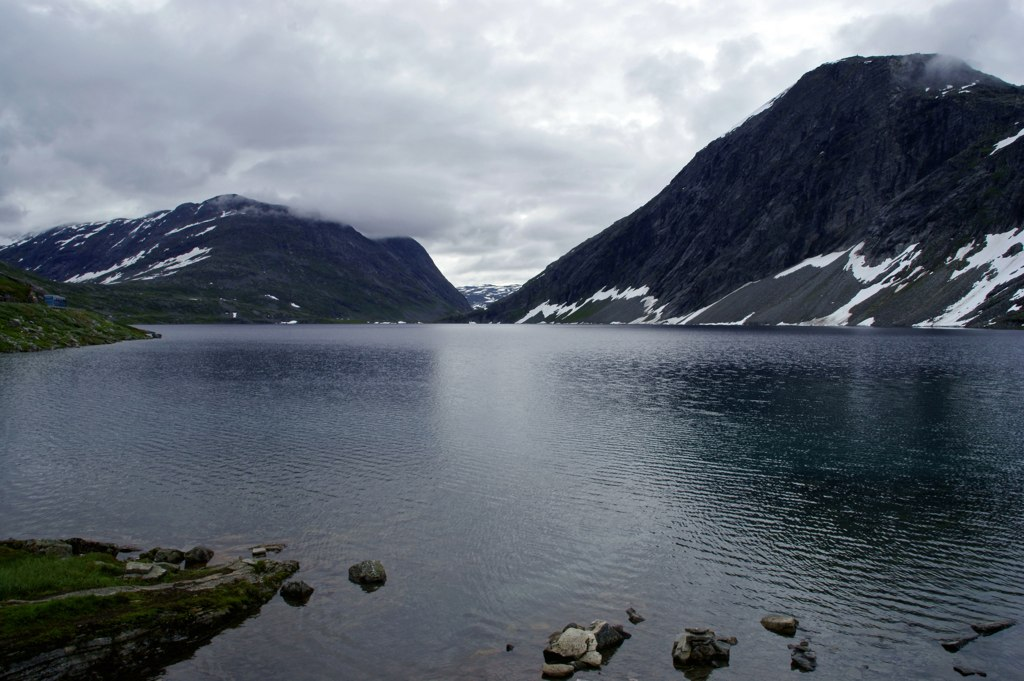
Djupvatnet in Stranda Municipality, Møre og Romsdal

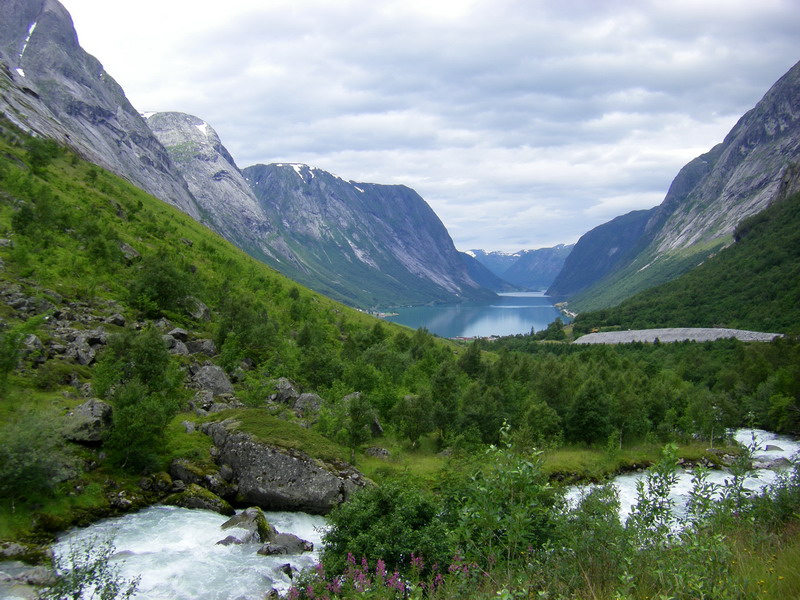
View of Jølstravatn in Sunnfjord Municipality, Vestland

Norway has 20,000 lakes larger than 0.1 square kilometres (100,000 m^{2}; 25 acres) and using that as the measuring limit, Norway place seventh on countries with most lakes in the world. However, there are at least 450,000 freshwater lakes in Norway. Most were created by glacial erosion.

== Types of lakes ==
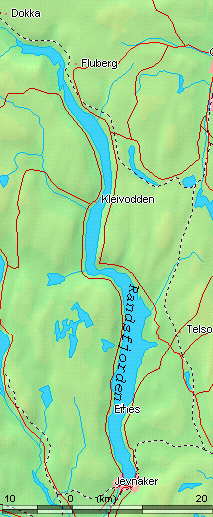
Randsfjorden's narrow shape and glacial "overdeepening" explains why it is named a fjord, even though it is not a saltwater inlet

Various Sami and Norwegian language terms distinguish different types of lake, and often feature in place names:

- Fjord: Although normally used to describe a saltwater inlet, in eastern Norway a long, narrow fresh water lake is also called a fjord (though this differs from the English use of the word: see fjord). Randsfjorden, mapped on the left, is the largest example of an inland fjord.
- Sjø: Although normally used to describe a sea, Sjø or Sjøen is also a large fresh-water lake that is not as narrow as a fjord. Examples include Vansjø in Østfold and Selbusjøen in Trøndelag.
- Mjøs: The form mjøs is also used for larger lakes. Mjøsa itself is a large lake between the towns of Gjøvik, Lillehammer and Hamar. Other examples of the usage include Vangsmjøse in Vang Municipality, Innlandet.
- Vatn: A vatn (or vann) is a small lake. You can walk around a vatn in a couple of hours. Sognsvann near Oslo is one example of such usage. Vatn might be used for large lakes further north, such as Altevatnet in Troms and Snåsavatnet in Trøndelag.
- Tjern: (from the Old Norse tjarn and tjǫrn) is a small lake. It is also written tjenn, tjørn and tjønn. The English cognate is tarn.
- Combinations: Østensjøvannet is an interesting variation that concatenates sjø and vann. Møsvann in Vinje Municipality, Telemark combines mjøsa with vann.
- Jávrásj: (Lule Sami, spoken in Nordland) or Jávrrás (Northern Sami, more widespread): Where the place names of the Sami people are used, these are limited to very small lakes, or ponds. None are listed here.
- Jávrre: (Lule Sami) or jávri (Northern Sami): These refer to larger lakes. The largest lake in Norway predominantly known by its Sami name is Siiddašjávri, which lies partly in Nordland but mostly in Sweden. Vuolep Sårjåsjávrre, also straddling the Nordland-Sweden border, is the largest with the Lule Sam ending -jávrre.
- Luoppal: (North Sámi) is a narrow lake with one river running into it, one river running out from it. May be difficult to distinguish from a temporary widening of a river.

== Largest lakes ==
Fewer than 400 of Norway's lakes have an area of more than 5 square kilometres (1.9 sq mi).

The following list shows the top ten lakes in Norway in terms of surface area. Dams and reservoirs with regulation height over; 15 metres are not included.

No.	Name	County	Area (km^{2})	Volume (km^{3})
1	Mjøsa	Innlandet and Akershus	369.48	56.24
2	Røssvatnet	Nordland	218.61	14.80
3	Femund	Innlandet and Trøndelag	203.40	6.04
4	Randsfjorden	Innlandet	140.69	6.61
5	Tyrifjorden	Buskerud	138.56	13.13
6	Snåsavatnet	Trøndelag	125.73	5.78
7	Tunnsjøen	Trøndelag	100.18	8.82
8	Limingen	Trøndelag	93.27	8.11
9	Øyeren	Akershus and Østfold	84.74	1.19
10	Nisser	Telemark	76.07	7.07

== Deepest lakes ==
Europe's four deepest lakes are in Norway, namely Hornindalsvatnet, Salvatnet, Lake Tinn and Mjøsa. The following list includes the lakes in Norway, with a known depth over 200 metres.

No.	Name	County	Maximum depth (m)	Average depth (m)
1	Hornindalsvatnet	Vestland	514	237
2	Salvatnet	Trøndelag	482^{*}	155
3	Lake Tinn	Telemark	460	190
4	Mjøsa	Innlandet and Akershus	453	150
5	Fyresvatnet	Telemark	377	120
6	Suldalsvatnet	Rogaland	376	156
7	Øvervatnet (in Fauske)	Nordland	346	N/D
8	Bandak	Telemark	325	121
9	Lundevatnet	Rogaland and Agder	314	172
10	Storsjøen (in Rendalen)	Innlandet	309	139
11	Totak	Telemark	306	63
12	Tyrifjorden	Buskerud	295	95
13	Breimsvatnet	Vestland	278	129
14	Ørsdalsvatnet	Rogaland	243	137
15	Røssvatnet	Nordland	240	68
16	Nisser	Telemark	234	93
17	Jølstravatnet	Vestland	233	89
18	Oppstrynsvatnet	Vestland	230	131
19	Tunnsjøen	Trøndelag	222	88
20	Dingevatnet	Vestland	220	88
21	Bygdin	Innlandet	215	52
22	Selbusjøen	Trøndelag	206	70
23	Kviteseidvatnet	Telemark	201	93

* Sources provide both 464 m (manual method) & 482 m (echo sounding) for the greatest depth.

== See also ==
- Geography of Norway
