= Ovrejaevrie =

Lake in Trøndelag county, Norway

Orvatnet (Norwegian) Ovrejaevrie (Southern Sami)
- Interactive map of the lake
- Location: Røyrvik Municipality, Trøndelag
- Coordinates: 64.9822°N 14.0516°E
- Basin countries: Norway
- Max. length: 4.5 kilometres (2.8 mi)
- Max. width: 1.8 kilometres (1.1 mi)
- Surface area: 4.9 km^{2} (1.9 sq mi)
- Shore length^{1}: 14.46 kilometres (8.99 mi)
- Surface elevation: 545 metres (1,788 ft)
- References: NVE
- ^{1} Shore length is not a well-defined measure.

Ovrejaevrie (Southern Sami) or Orvatnet (Norwegian) is a lake in Røyrvik Municipality in Trøndelag county, Norway. The water from the 4.9-square-kilometre (1.9 sq mi) lake flows out through the river Orelva into the lake Namsvatnet. This lake lies within Børgefjell National Park, less than 250 metres (820 ft) to the west of the border with Sweden.

== See also ==
- List of lakes in Norway
