= Salvatnet =

Lake in Trøndelag, Norway

- Interactive map of the lake
- Location: Namsos Municipality, Trøndelag
- Coordinates: 64.7108°N 11.5546°E
- Type: glacial fjord meromictic lake, moraine-dammed
- Primary inflows: Ambudalselva, Eidelva (Sakselva), Helsåa, Hendelva and Nedre Straumen
- Primary outflows: Moselva
- Catchment area: 431.9 km^{2} (166.8 sq mi)
- Basin countries: Norway
- Max. length: 25 km (16 mi)
- Max. width: 3 km (1.9 mi)
- Surface area: 44.96 km^{2} (17.36 sq mi)
- Average depth: 155 m (509 ft)
- Max. depth: 482 m (1,581 ft)
- Water volume: 6.97 km^{3} (1.67 cu mi)
- Shore length^{1}: 105.61 km (65.62 mi)
- Surface elevation: 9 m (30 ft)
- Islands: Storøya
- References: NVE and Seppälä
- ^{1} Shore length is not a well-defined measure.

Salvatnet is a lake in Namsos Municipality in Trøndelag county, Norway. With its deepest depth of 482 metres (1,581 ft), it is Norway's and Europe's second-deepest lake, after Hornindalsvatnet. Alternate sources give the depth as either 464 metres (1,522 ft) (old manual method) or 482 metres (1,581 ft) (modern echo sounding method) at the deepest point. The lake sits close to the Norwegian Sea, about 9 metres (30 ft) above sea level at the surface and reaches to a depth of 473 metres (1,552 ft) below sea level. It is a large lake with an area of 44.96 square kilometres (17.36 sq mi), a volume of 6.97 cubic kilometres (1.67 cu mi), and a shoreline that is 105.61 kilometres (65.62 mi) around.

Salvatnet is a meromictic lake, meaning that the water is permanently stratified, often without oxygen in the lower depths (bottom water) due to density gradient and a lack of turnover. A meromictic lake often preserves records of the geologic past. The lower layer of the lake is highly saline and as a result denser than the higher levels of water. Other meromictic lakes in Norway; with old seawater in the lower depths include Botnvatnet, Kilevann, Rossfjordvatnet, Rørholtfjorden an arm of the lake Tokke, Rørhopvatnet, Tronstadvann, and Øvervatnet.

== See also ==
- List of lakes in Norway
