= Jengelvatnet =

Lake in Trøndelag and Nordland, Norway

Jengelvatnet (Norwegian) Giengelvihke (Southern Sami)
- Interactive map of the lake
- Location: Trøndelag and Nordland
- Coordinates: 65.1179°N 13.6508°E
- Basin countries: Norway
- Max. length: 2.5 kilometres (1.6 mi)
- Max. width: 2 kilometres (1.2 mi)
- Surface area: 2.54 km^{2} (0.98 sq mi)
- Shore length^{1}: 12.9 kilometres (8.0 mi)
- Surface elevation: 652 metres (2,139 ft)
- References: NVE
- ^{1} Shore length is not a well-defined measure.

Jengelvatnet (Norwegian) or Giengelvihke (Southern Sami) is a lake in Norway that lies on the borders of Røyrvik Municipality (in Trøndelag county) and Grane Municipality and Hattfjelldal Municipality (both in Nordland county). The 2.54-square-kilometre (0.98 sq mi) lake lies inside Børgefjell National Park and it drains to the south into the lake Namsvatnet.

== See also ==
- List of lakes in Norway
