= Limingen =

Lake in Trøndelag, Norway

Limingen (Norwegian) Lyjmede (Southern Sami)
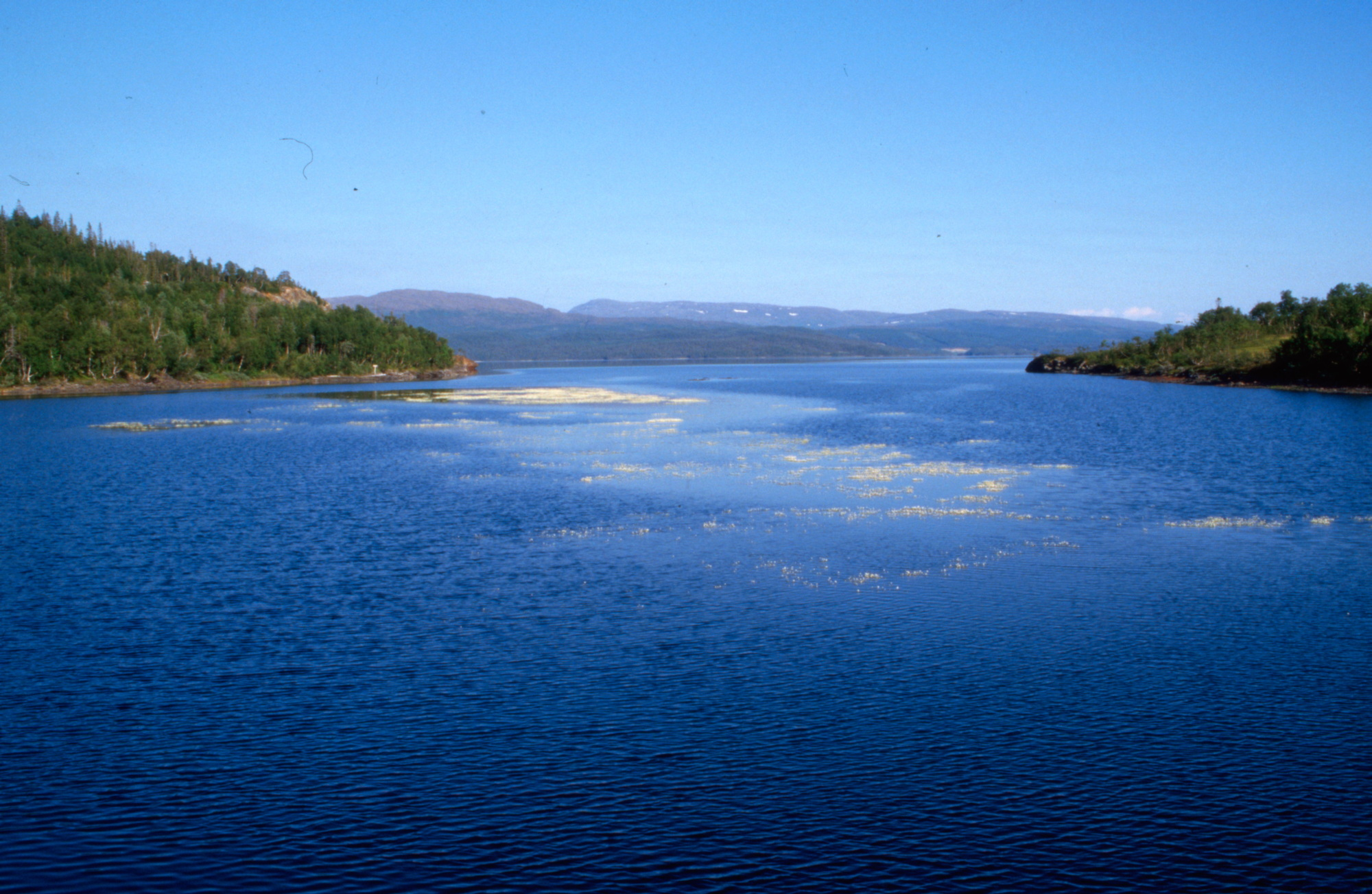
- Limingen, Nord-Trøndelag, Norway
- Interactive map of the lake
- Location: Lierne Municipality and Røyrvik Municipality, Trøndelag
- Coordinates: 64.7056°N 13.7442°E
- Type: Glacier lake
- Primary inflows: Bjørkvasselva, Devikelva, Gåsvasselva, Limingelva and Røyrvikelva
- Primary outflows: Linvasselva
- Catchment area: 675.25 km^{2} (260.72 sq mi)
- Basin countries: Norway
- Max. length: 25 km (16 mi)
- Max. width: 6 km (3.7 mi)
- Surface area: 93.27 km^{2} (36.01 sq mi)
- Average depth: 87 m (285 ft)
- Max. depth: 192 m (630 ft)
- Water volume: 8.114 km^{3} (1.947 cu mi)
- Shore length^{1}: 108 km (67 mi)
- Surface elevation: 418 m (1,371 ft)
- References: NVE
- ^{1} Shore length is not a well-defined measure.

Limingen (Norwegian) or Lyjmede (Southern Sami) is a lake in Røyrvik Municipality and Lierne Municipality in Trøndelag county, Norway. It is the eighth-largest lake in the country. The lake lies 418 m (1,371 ft) above sea level; and has an area of about 93 km^{2} (36 sq mi). At the deepest point, it is 192 m (630 ft) deep and averages about 87 m (285 ft) deep. The lake has a volume of about 8.1 km^{3} (1.9 cu mi) and is located just north of the large lake Tunnsjøen. The border with Sweden lies about 725 metres (0.5 mi) east of the lake.

The lake level is regulated by dams. The Røyrvikelva river flows into the north end of Limingen from the lake Vektaren, through a dam. The water flows out through a tunnel to Røyrvikfoss Power Station, at the village of Røyrvik. At the south end, near the village of Limingen in Lierne Municipality, the water flows out of the tunnel to the Tunnsjøen via the Tunnsjø Power Station, as well as to Linvasselv Power Station on the Swedish side. The water level varies by up to about 10 metres (33 ft) in level.
