= Tunnsjødal Hydroelectric Power Station =

Hydroelectric power station in Norway

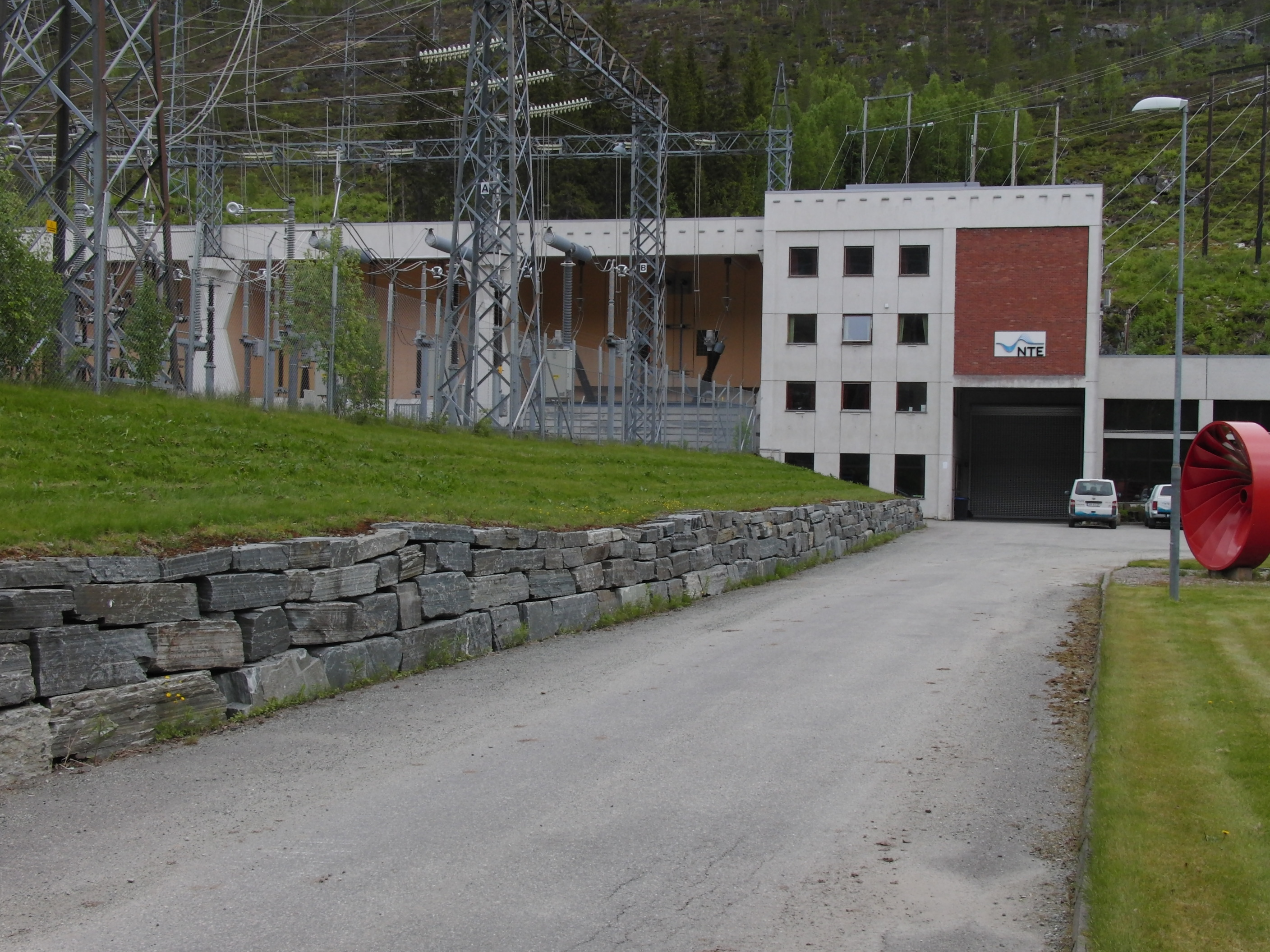
- Tunnsjødal Hydroelectric Power Station
- Official name: Tunnsjødal kraftverk
- Country: Norway
- Location: Namsskogan Municipality
- Coordinates: 64°42′12″N 12°50′08″E
- Status: Operational
- Opening date: 1962; 63 years ago
- Owner(s): Nord-Trøndelag Elektrisitetsverk

Upper reservoir
- Creates: Tunnsjøflyan

Lower reservoir
- Creates: Namsen

Power Station
- Hydraulic head: 238 metres (781 ft)
- Installed capacity: 176 MW
- Capacity factor: 53.2%
- Annual generation: 820 GW·h

The Tunnsjødal Power Station (Tunnsjødal kraftverk) is a hydroelectric power station located in Namsskogan Municipality in Trøndelag county, Norway. It operates at an installed capacity of 176 megawatts (236,000 hp), with an average annual production of 820 gigawatt-hours (3,000 TJ).

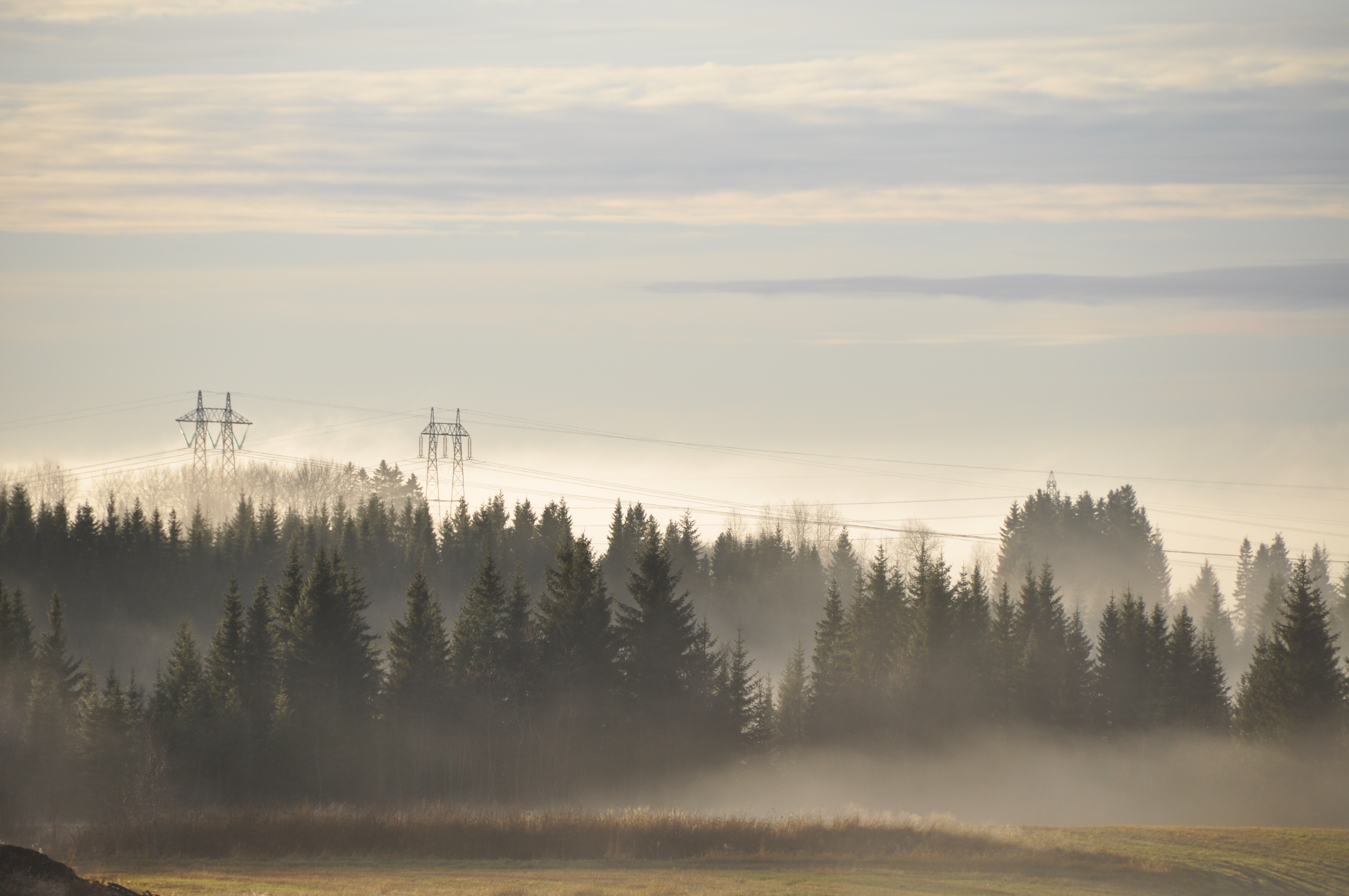
Tunnsjødal–Strinda power lines
