= Selbustrand Church =

Church in Trøndelag, Norway

- Selbustrand kirke
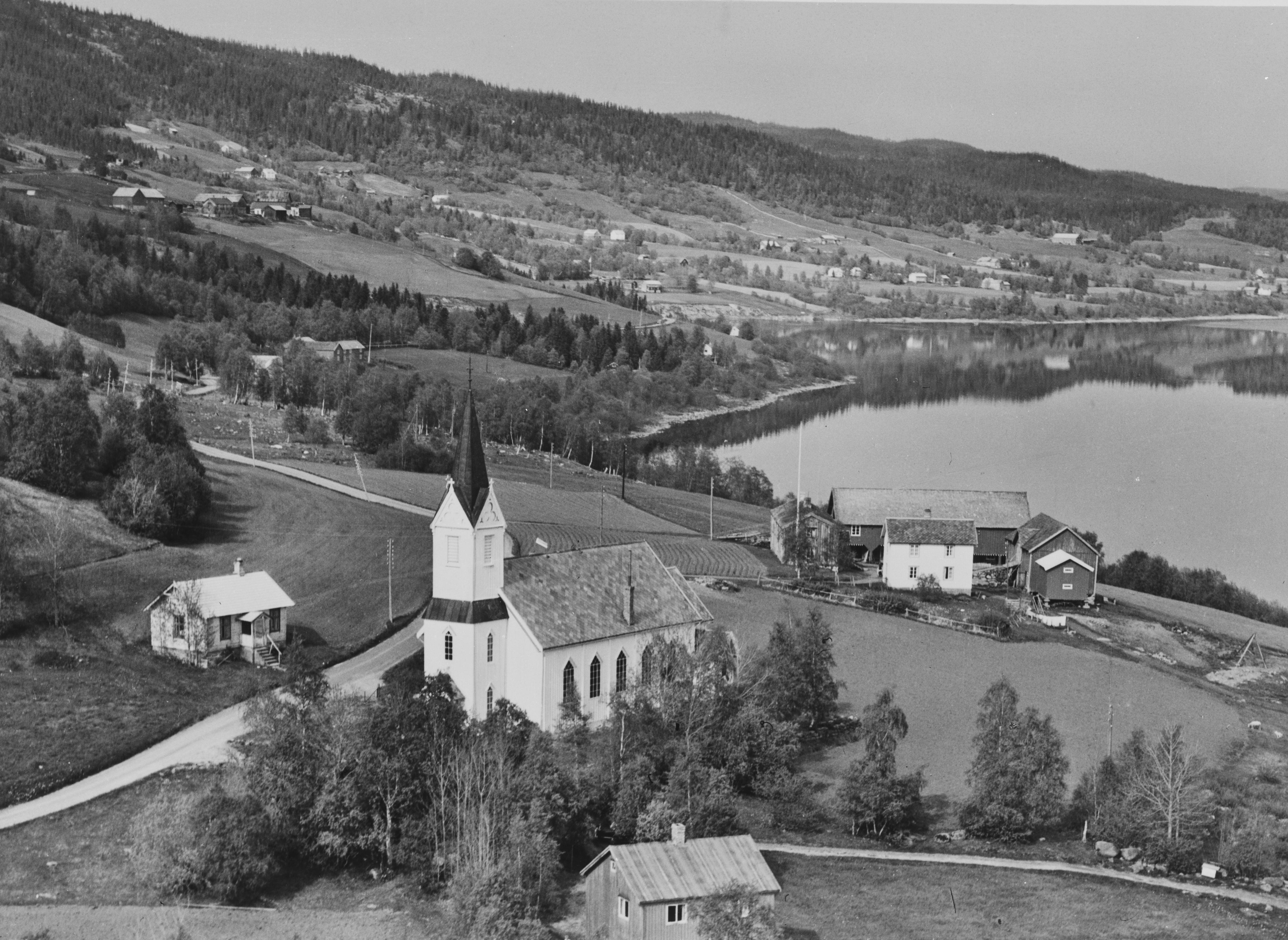
- View of the church
- Selbustrand Church
- 63.248637030°N 10.951934158°E
- Location: Selbu Municipality, Trøndelag
- Country: Norway
- Denomination: Church of Norway
- Churchmanship: Evangelical Lutheran

History
- Status: Parish church
- Founded: 1901
- Consecrated: 1901

Architecture
- Functional status: Active
- Architect: Olaf Jarl Alstad
- Architectural type: Long church
- Completed: 1901 (125 years ago)

Specifications
- Capacity: 300
- Materials: Wood

Administration
- Diocese: Nidaros bispedømme
- Deanery: Stjørdal prosti
- Parish: Selbu
- Norwegian Cultural Heritage Site
- Type: Church
- Status: Not protected
- ID: 85416

Selbustrand Church (Norwegian: Selbustrand kirke) is a parish church of the Church of Norway in Selbu Municipality in Trøndelag County, Norway. It is located in the village of Selbustrand. It is one of the churches for the Selbu parish which is part of the Stjørdal prosti (deanery) in the Diocese of Nidaros. The white, wooden church was built in a long church style in 1901 using plans drawn up by the architect Olaf Jarl Alstad. The church seats about 300 people.

== History ==
The chapel at Selbustrand was built in 1901. It was the first church in the village. Later it was upgraded to the status of parish church.

== See also ==
- List of churches in Nidaros
