= Grey Troender =

Norwegian breed of sheep

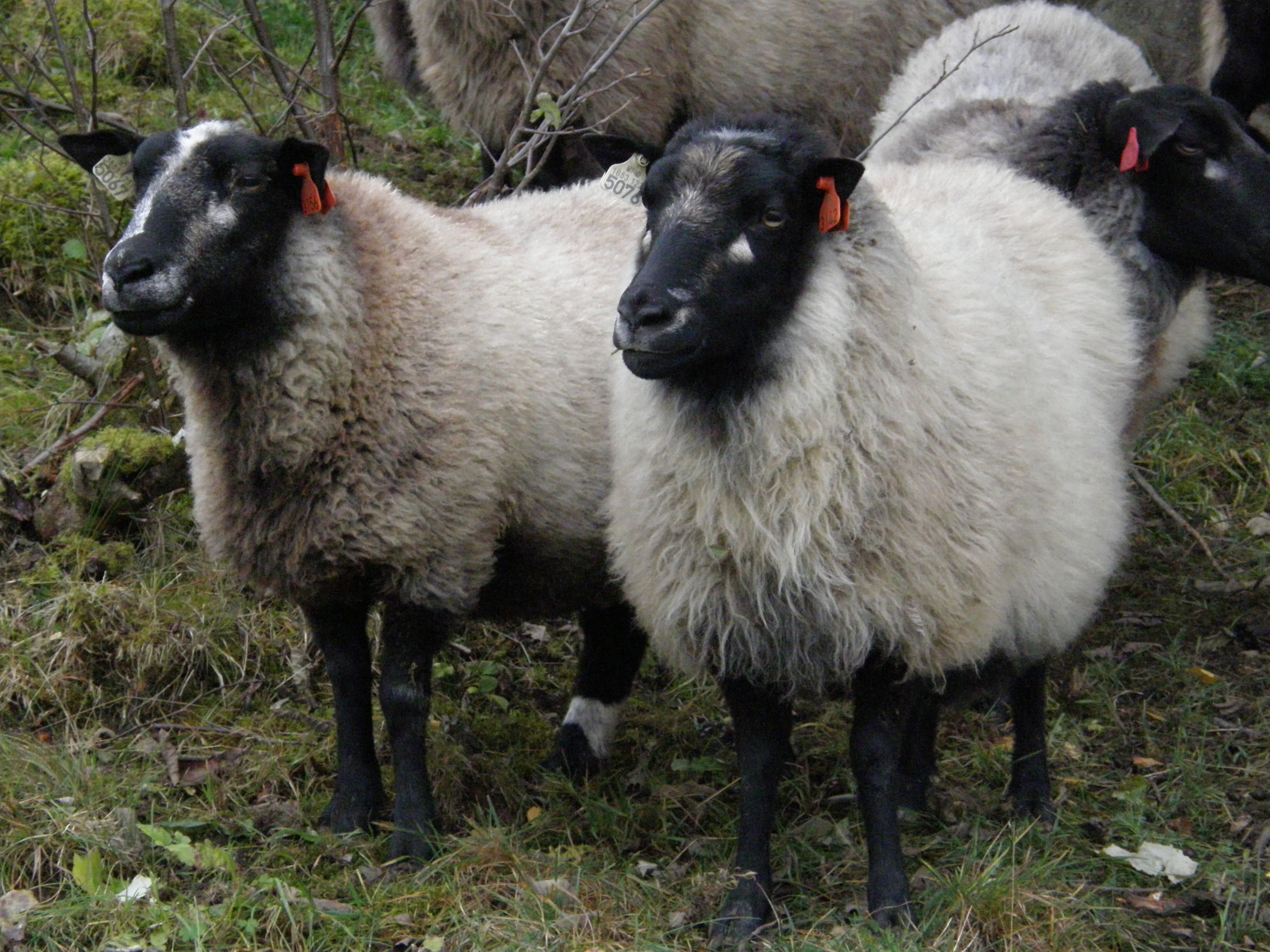
- Conservation status: FAO (2007: no data; DAD-IS (2025): at risk/endangered-maintained
- Other names: Grå Trøndersau; Grey Trønder
- Country of origin: Norway
- Standard: Norsk Sau og Geit (in Norwegian)

Traits
- Weight: Male: 60–90 kg; Female: 50–80 kg
- Wool colour: usually grey

The Grey Troender (Norwegian: Grå Trøndersau) is an endangered Norwegian breed of domestic sheep. It originated in – and is named for – the Trøndelag region of central Norway, and is thought to derive from cross-breeding in the late nineteenth century of local feral sheep of the area with stock of the now-extinct Tautra.

The sheep are usually grey, in varying shades, with black face and legs and a small distinctive white marking under each eye; other colours including black, brown and white are seen in about 20% of the population.

== History ==
The Grey Troender originated in the Trøndelag region of central Norway, from which its name derives. It is thought to have resulted from cross-breeding in the late nineteenth century of local feral sheep of the area with stock of the now-extinct Tautra, from the island of Tautra in the kommune of Frosta in Trøndelag. It became identifiable as a distinct breed or type in the late nineteenth century or from about 1930; a full description was written by Fritz Loyt Johnsen in 1941.

By the 1990s it considered to be extinct. In 1992 a surviving group was identified and rescued when already on its way to the slaughterhouse; this formed the basis of the first conservation flock.

At the turn of the century there were approximately fifty of the sheep. In 2025 a total population of 1959–9275 head was reported, including 1959 breeding ewes; the conservation status of the breed was listed in DAD-IS as "at risk/endangered-maintained".

== Characteristics ==
The Grey Troender is of medium size; ewes weigh from 50 to 80 kg, rams about 10 kg more. The fleece is usually grey, varying in shade from light grey to almost black; other colours including black, brown and white are seen in about 20% of the population. The face is black, with a small distinctive tear-shaped white marking under each eye and sometimes with some white on the ridge of the nose; the legs are also black. The tail is of medium length.

== Use ==
The Grey Troender yields a fleece weighing some 2–3 kg greasy, with an average fibre diameter of 32.3 μm (equivalent to a Bradford count of 48s).

When raised for meat, lambs are sent for slaughter after about six months, when they weigh some 30–40 kg.
