= Røyrvik Church =

Church in Trøndelag, Norway

- Røyrvik kirke
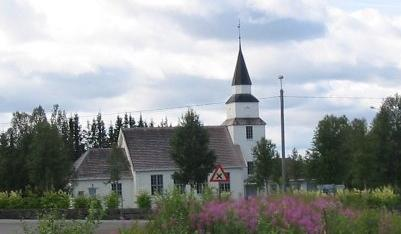
- View of the church
- Røyrvik Church
- 64.8863319°N 13.555358°E
- Location: Røyrvik Municipality, Trøndelag
- Country: Norway
- Denomination: Church of Norway
- Churchmanship: Evangelical Lutheran

History
- Former name: Røyrvik kapell
- Status: Parish church
- Founded: 1828
- Consecrated: 25 June 1901

Architecture
- Functional status: Active
- Architect: Olaf Jarl Alstad
- Architectural type: Long church
- Completed: 1901 (125 years ago)

Specifications
- Capacity: 180
- Materials: Wood

Administration
- Diocese: Nidaros bispedømme
- Deanery: Namdal prosti
- Parish: Røyrvik
- Norwegian Cultural Heritage Site
- Type: Church
- Status: Not protected
- ID: 85351

Røyrvik Church (Norwegian: Røyrvik kirke) is a parish church of the Church of Norway in Røyrvik Municipality in Trøndelag county, Norway. It is located in the village of Røyrvik. It is the church for the Røyrvik parish which is part of the Namdal prosti (deanery) in the Diocese of Nidaros. The white, wooden church was built in a long church style in 1901 using plans drawn up by the architect Olaf Jarl Alstad. The church seats about 180 people.

== History ==
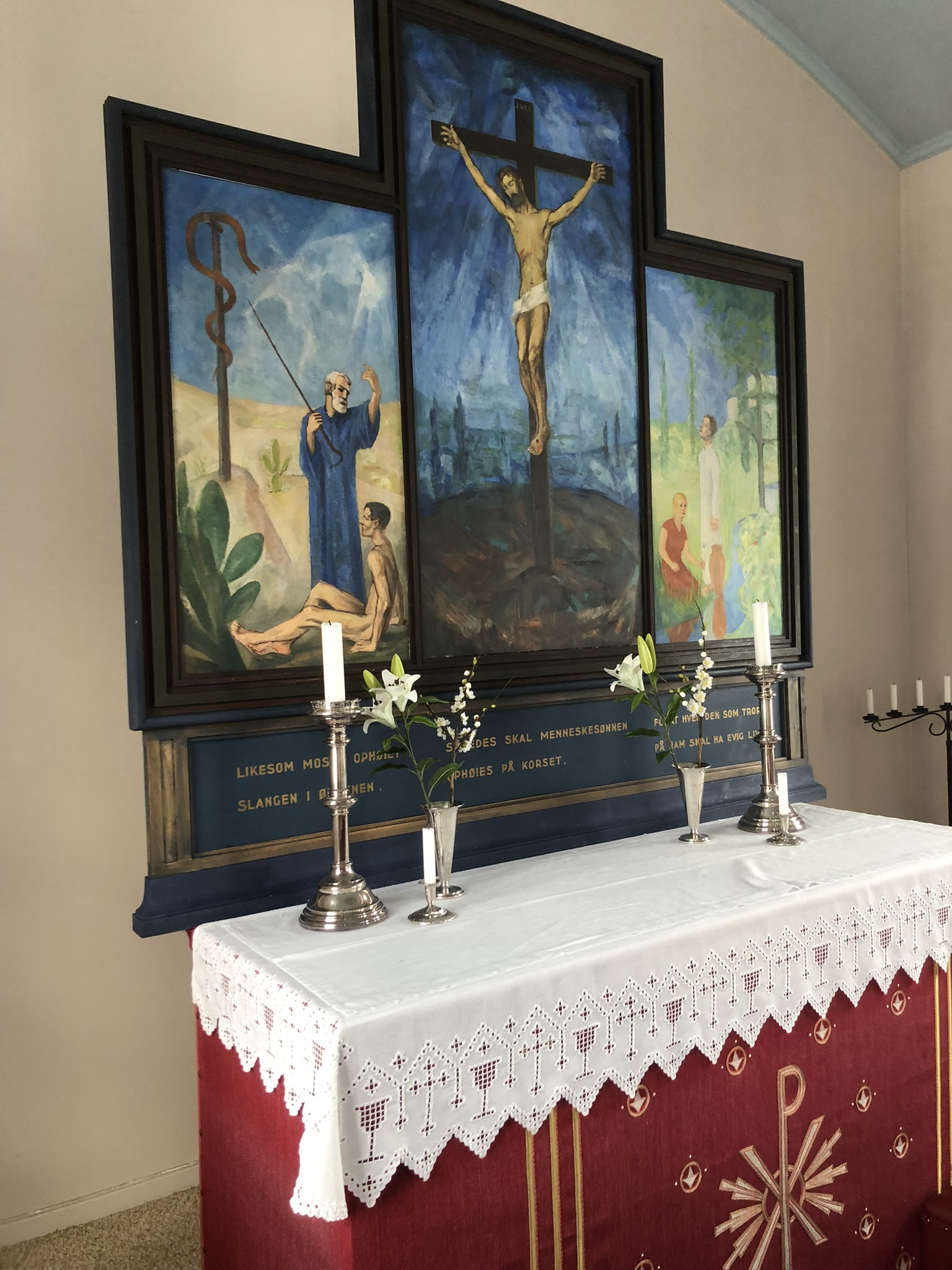
Altarpiece by Roar Matheson Bye.

The Norwegian settlers and the local Sami people in the sparsely populated area received permission in a royal resolution of 16 February 1828 to build an annex chapel for the Røyrvik area. The chapel would fall under the priest of Grong Church, the main church for the parish. This was while Hans Peter Schnitler Krag (father of road director Hans Hagerup Krag) was the parish priest. No specific architect is listed in any of the existing records from the parish and there is no record of any parish money being spent on the construction. This may mean that the local population built the chapel and all the materials were donated. The chapel was consecrated on 11 September 1828. For many years, the chapel was only used during the summer months for worship services. For many years in early July each year, the priest from Grong Church would hold a big worship service where there would be many baptisms, weddings, confirmations, and funerals. The local sheriff would also hold meetings and be available to meet with residents during this time as well.

In 1896, the architect Olaf Jarl Alstad designed plans for a much larger church in Røyrvik. The plans were approved in 1898, but due to funding problems, the new church was not built until 1901. It was built on the same site as the previous chapel which was torn down. The new church was consecrated on 25 June 1901. In 1926, the church purchased an organ. The new church is a long church design with a tower on the west end. A sacristy was added during some renovations in 1965-1966.

== See also ==
- List of churches in Nidaros
