= Namsvatnet =

Lake in Trøndelag, Norway

Namsvatnet (Norwegian) Nååmesjenjaevrie (Southern Sami)
- Interactive map of the lake
- Location: Røyrvik Municipality, Trøndelag
- Coordinates: 64.9974°N 13.5759°E
- Primary outflows: Namsen
- Basin countries: Norway
- Max. length: 16 kilometres (9.9 mi)
- Max. width: 4.5 kilometres (2.8 mi)
- Surface area: 39.38 km^{2} (15.20 sq mi)
- Shore length^{1}: 73.76 kilometres (45.83 mi)
- Surface elevation: 455 metres (1,493 ft)
- References: NVE
- ^{1} Shore length is not a well-defined measure.

Namsvatnet (Norwegian) or Nååmesjenjaevrie (Southern Sami) is a 39.38-square-kilometre (15.20 sq mi) lake in Røyrvik Municipality in Trøndelag county, Norway. The river Namsen used to be the primary outlet, but the lake has been regulated for hydroelectric generation since 1959 and part of the water is diverted south towards a power station. The lake is fed by three main sources within Børgefjell National Park: the river Storelva which comes from the lake Jengelvatnet, the river Virmaelva, and the river Orelva which comes from the lake Ovrejaevrie. Namsvatnet has Arctic char, trout, and small carp. Today, tourism is an important activity.

== See also ==
- List of lakes in Norway
