= Inge Staldvik =

Norwegian politician

Inge Staldvik (born 6 January 1955) is a Norwegian politician, first for the Labour Party and later for the Socialist Left Party.

Staldvik was mayor of Røyrvik Municipality from 1983 to 1985. He sat as the Labour Party's first deputy member from Nord-Trøndelag in the Parliament of Norway from 1981 to 1985. In 1985, he was elected to parliament, and re-elected in 1989. He left the Labour Party concerning disagreements about Norwegian membership in the European Union, and joined the Socialist Left Party afterwards. He sat in parliament from 1993 to 1997 as the Socialist Left Party's first deputy member. While in parliament, Staldvik sat on the Standing Committee on Agriculture. From 1999 to 2007, he also sat on Nord-Trøndelag County Council.
