= Olaf Jarl Alstad =

Norwegian architect

- Born: 26 April 1854; Trondheim, Norway
- Died: 12 January 1947 (aged 92); Trondheim, Norway
- Occupation: Architect

Olaf Jarl Alstad (1854–1947) was a Norwegian architect.

He was born in Trondheim, Norway on 26 April 1854. He parents were Mathias Olaus Alstad and Louise Amalie Steen. He never married or had children. He died in Trondheim on 12 January 1947.

Olaf Jarl Alstad was a student at Trondhjem's technical college, graduating in 1874. He did some further studies at the University of Hanover in Germany. He became an architect and later was a teacher of architecture. He studied freehand drawing, shadow theory, and perspective. From 1900 to 1915 he was a member of the board of the Society for the Preservation of Ancient Norwegian Monuments.

== Works ==
- Røyrvik Church
- Selbustrand Church
