= Røyrvik Municipality =

Municipality in Trøndelag, Norway

Røyrvik Municipality Røyrvik kommune Raarvihken tjïelte
- Municipality
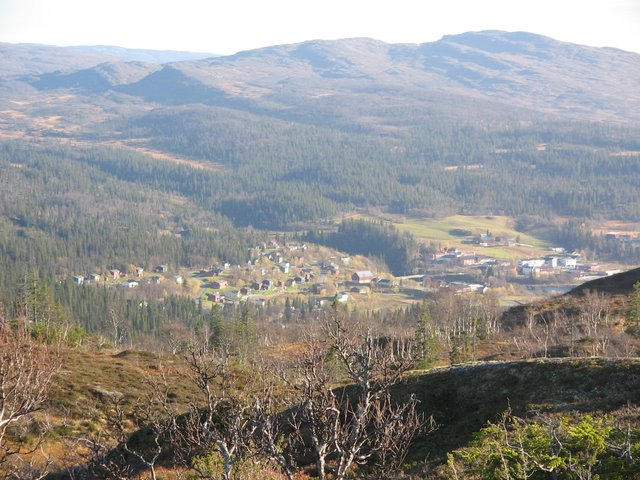
- View of the village of Røyrvik

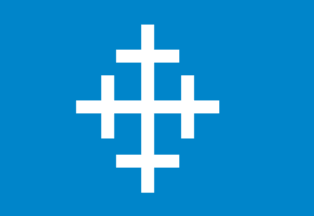
- Flag Coat of arms

- Trøndelag within Norway

- Røyrvik within Trøndelag
- Coordinates: 64°55′15″N 13°39′03″E
- Country: Norway
- County: Trøndelag
- District: Namdalen
- Established: 1 July 1923
  - Preceded by: Grong Municipality
- Administrative centre: Røyrvik

Government
  - Mayor (2023): Kennet Tømmermo Reitan (LL)

Area
  - Total: 1,584.74 km^{2} (611.87 sq mi)
  - Land: 1,329.62 km^{2} (513.37 sq mi)
  - Water: 255.12 km^{2} (98.50 sq mi) 16.1%
  - Rank: #50 in Norway
- Highest elevation: 1,511.98 m (4,960.6 ft)

Population (2024)
  - Total: 423
  - Rank: #355 in Norway
  - Density: 0.3/km^{2} (0.78/sq mi)
  - Change (10 years): ▼ −15.1%
- Demonym: Røyrvik-folk

Official language
  - Norwegian form: Neutral
- Time zone: UTC+01:00 (CET)
  - Summer (DST): UTC+02:00 (CEST)
- ISO 3166 code: NO-5043
- Website: Official website

Røyrvik or Raarvihke (Southern Sami) is a municipality in Trøndelag county, Norway. It is part of the Namdalen region. The administrative centre of the municipality is the village of Røyrvik. The area has always had a strong Sami influence. The village lays relatively close to the border with Sweden and the municipal boundary eastwards forms part of the international border.

The 1,585-square-kilometre (612 sq mi) municipality is the 50th largest by area out of the 357 municipalities in Norway. Røyrvik Municipality is the 355th most populous municipality in Norway with a population of 423 making it the 3rd smallest municipal population in Norway (after Modalen Municipality and Utsira Municipality). The municipality's population density is 0.3 inhabitants per square kilometre (0.78/sq mi) and its population has decreased by 15.1% over the previous 10-year period.

== General information ==
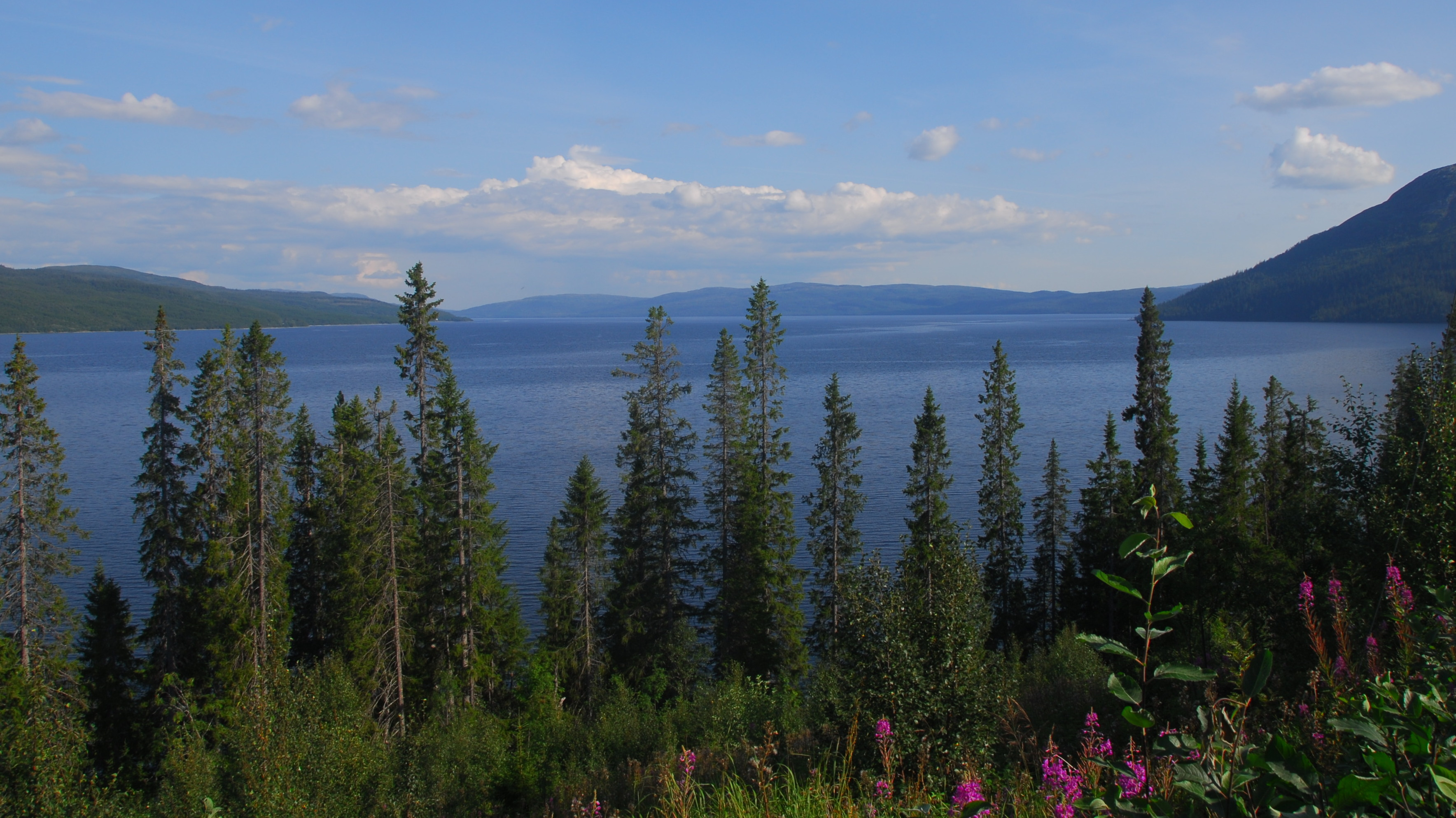
View of the lake Tunnsjøen

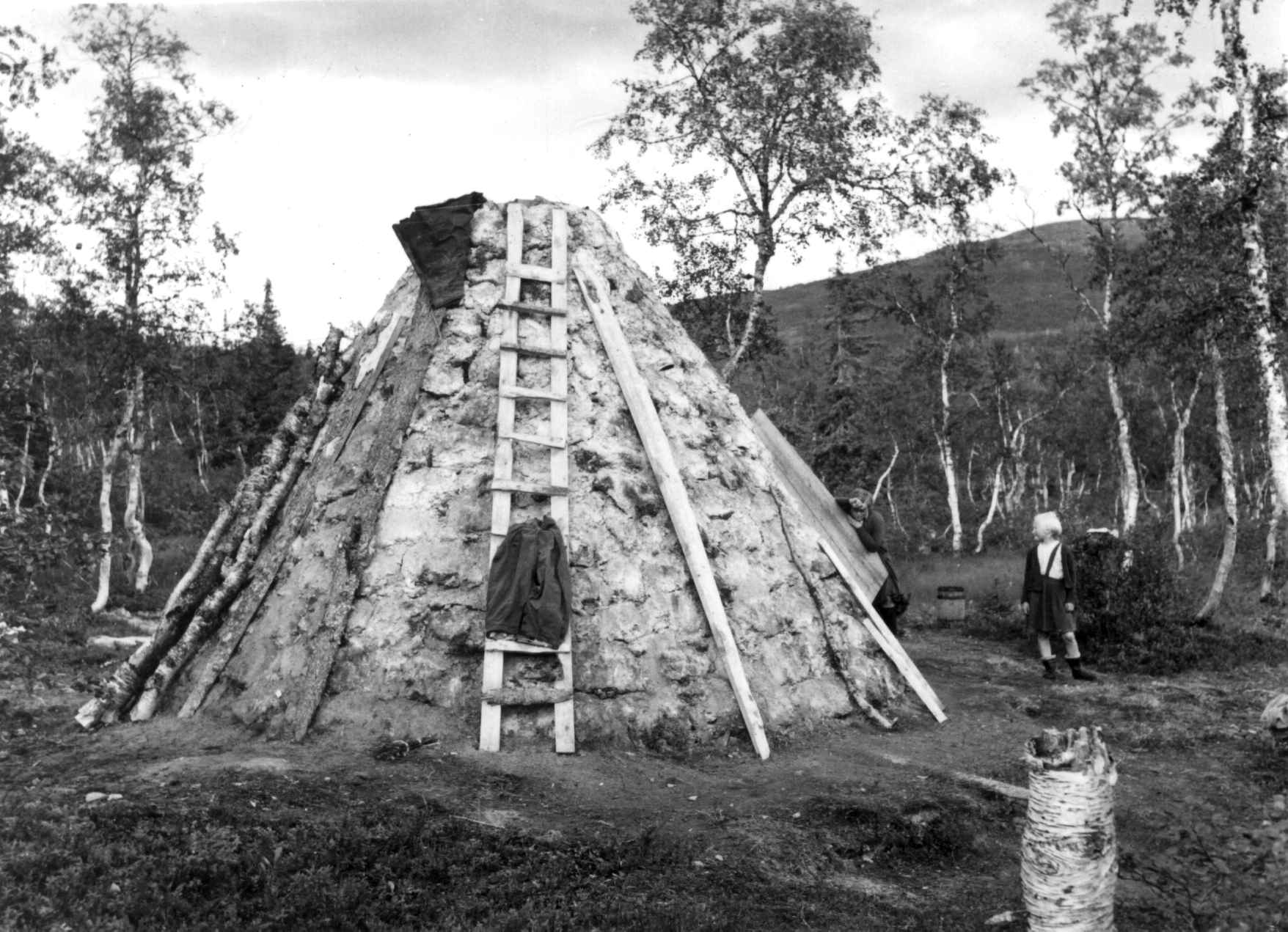
Old Sami building in Røyrvik

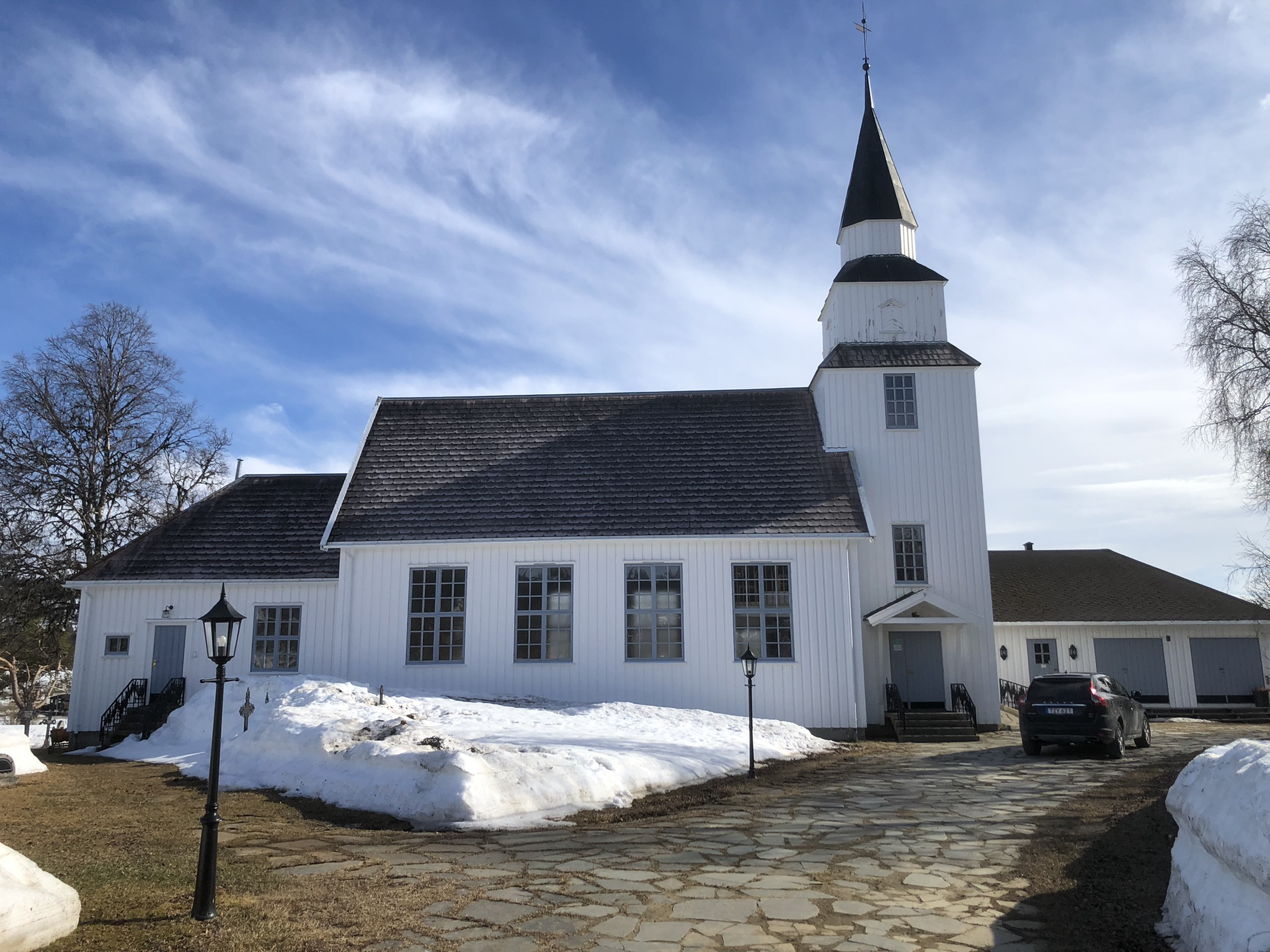
View of Røyrvik Church

The municipality of Røyrvik was established on 1 July 1923 when it was separated from the large Grong Municipality. Initially, the population was 392. The municipal boundaries have not since changed. On 1 January 2018, the municipality switched from the old Nord-Trøndelag county to the new Trøndelag county.

=== Name ===
The municipality (originally the parish) is named after the old Røyrvik farm (historically: Røirviken) since the first Røyrvik Church was built there (in 1828). The first element is røyr which means "Arctic char". The last element is vik which means "inlet".

On 13 June 2014, the national government approved a resolution to add a co-equal, official Southern Sami language name for the municipality: Raarvihke. The spelling of the Sami language name changes depending on how it is used. It is called Raarvihke when it is spelled alone, but it is Raarvihken tjïelte when using the Sami language equivalent to "Røyrvik Municipality".

=== Coat of arms ===
The coat of arms was granted on 13 December 1985. The official blazon is "Azure, a cross crosslet argent" (Norwegian: I blått et korset sølv kors). This means the arms have a blue field (background) and the charge is a cross crosslet. The charge has a tincture of argent which means it is commonly colored white, but if it is made out of metal, then silver is used. This design is a common decoration on the pottery, hand-made articles, and traditional pewter embroidery found in the area. These objects were made by the ancestors of the Southern Sámi people presently living in the area. The crosses are a solar symbol indicating the four points of the compass. The arms were designed by Alfhild Vekterli and reworked by Einar H. Skjervold. The municipal flag has the same design as the coat of arms.

=== Churches ===
The Church of Norway has one parish (sokn) within Røyrvik Municipality. It is part of the Namdal prosti (deanery) in the Diocese of Nidaros.

Churches in Røyrvik Municipality
Parish (sokn)	Church name	Location of the church	Year built
Røyrvik	Røyrvik Church	Røyrvik	1828

== Geography ==
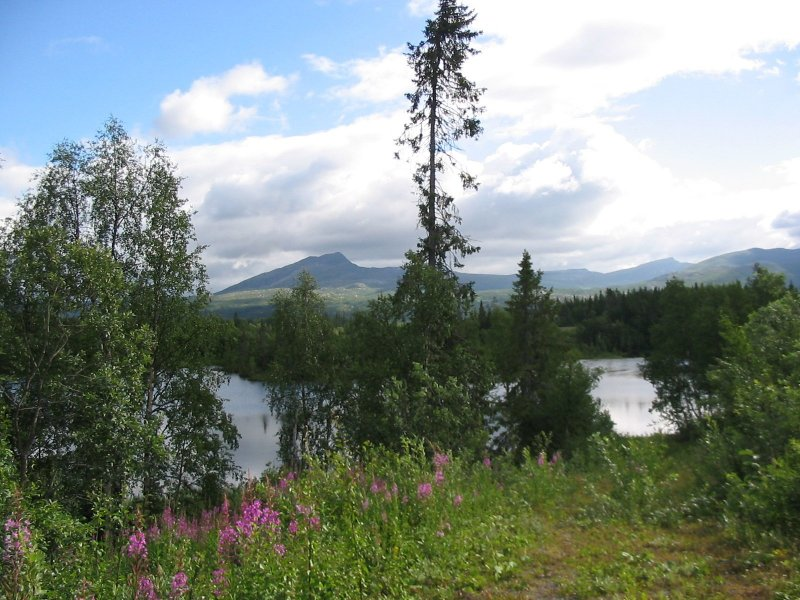
Rural area in Røyrvik

The area is covered with many large lakes such as Limingen, the 9th largest in Norway. Other lakes include Jengelvatnet, Namsvatnet, Ovrejaevrie, Storgollomsvatnet, Tunnsjøen, and Tunnsjøflyan. The river Namsen begins in the lake Namsvatnet.

The mountainous areas also offer plentiful opportunities for outdoor activities. The highest point in the municipality is the 1,511.98-metre (4,960.6 ft) tall mountain Jetnamsklumpen, located inside Børgefjell National Park.

== Government ==
Røyrvik Municipality is responsible for primary education (through 10th grade), outpatient health services, senior citizen services, welfare and other social services, zoning, economic development, and municipal roads and utilities. The municipality is governed by a municipal council of directly elected representatives. The mayor is indirectly elected by a vote of the municipal council. The municipality is under the jurisdiction of the Trøndelag District Court and the Frostating Court of Appeal.

Municipal waste management has since 2020 been handled by the inter-municipal Midtre Namdal Avfallsselskap, with ReTrans Midt handling waste collection.

=== Municipal council ===
The municipal council (Kommunestyre) of Røyrvik Municipality is made up of 11 representatives that are elected to four year terms. The tables below show the current and historical composition of the council by political party.

Røyrvik kommunestyre 2023–2027
Party name (in Norwegian)	Number of representatives
Labour Party (Arbeiderpartiet)	2
Joint list in Røyrvik: Free voters, Conservative Party, Christian Democratic Party, Centre Party, and Liberal Party (Samarbeidslista i Røyrvik: frie velgere, H, Krf, Sp, og V)	6
Røyrvik Local List (Røyrvik Bygdeliste)	3
Total number of members:	11

Røyrvik kommunestyre 2019–2023
Party name (in Norwegian)	Number of representatives
Labour Party (Arbeiderpartiet)	4
Joint list in Røyrvik: Free voters, Conservative Party, Christian Democratic Party, Centre Party, and Liberal Party (Samarbeidslista i Røyrvik: frie velgere, H, Krf, Sp, og V)	7
Total number of members:	11

Røyrvik kommunestyre 2015–2019
Party name (in Norwegian)	Number of representatives
Labour Party (Arbeiderpartiet)	5
Joint list in Røyrvik: Free voters, Conservative Party, Christian Democratic Party, Centre Party, and Liberal Party (Samarbeidslista i Røyrvik: frie velgere, H, Krf, Sp, og V)	8
Total number of members:	13

Røyrvik kommunestyre 2011–2015
Party name (in Norwegian)	Number of representatives
Labour Party (Arbeiderpartiet)	7
Joint list in Røyrvik: Free voters, Conservative Party, Christian Democratic Party, Centre Party, and Liberal Party (Samarbeidslista i Røyrvik: frie velgere, H, Krf, Sp, og V)	6
Total number of members:	13

Røyrvik kommunestyre 2007–2011
Party name (in Norwegian)	Number of representatives
Labour Party (Arbeiderpartiet)	6
Joint list in Røyrvik: Free voters, Conservative Party, Christian Democratic Party, Centre Party, and Liberal Party (Samarbeidslista i Røyrvik: frie velgere, H, Krf, Sp, og V)	7
Total number of members:	13

Røyrvik kommunestyre 2003–2007
Party name (in Norwegian)	Number of representatives
Labour Party (Arbeiderpartiet)	4
Socialist Left Party (Sosialistisk Venstreparti)	1
Joint list in Røyrvik: Free voters, Conservative Party, Christian Democratic Party, Centre Party, and Liberal Party (Samarbeidslista i Røyrvik: frie velgere, H, Krf, Sp, og V)	8
Total number of members:	13

Røyrvik kommunestyre 1999–2003
Party name (in Norwegian)	Number of representatives
Labour Party (Arbeiderpartiet)	4
Socialist Left Party (Sosialistisk Venstreparti)	3
Joint list of the Conservative Party (Høyre), Christian Democratic Party (Kristelig Folkeparti), Centre Party (Senterpartiet), and Liberal Party (Venstre)	10
Total number of members:	17

Røyrvik kommunestyre 1995–1999
Party name (in Norwegian)	Number of representatives
Labour Party (Arbeiderpartiet)	4
Socialist Left Party (Sosialistisk Venstreparti)	2
Liberal Party (Venstre)	1
Joint list: Conservative Party, Christian Democratic Party, Centre Party, and Free voters (Fellesliste: Høyre, Kristelig Folkeparti, Senterpartiet og Frie Velgere)	10
Total number of members:	17

Røyrvik kommunestyre 1991–1995
Party name (in Norwegian)	Number of representatives
Labour Party (Arbeiderpartiet)	6
Socialist Left Party (Sosialistisk Venstreparti)	1
Liberal Party (Venstre)	1
Joint list: Conservative Party, Christian Democratic Party, Centre Party, and Free voters (Samarbeidsliste: Høyre, Kristelig Folkeparti, Senterpartiet og Frie Velgere)	9
Total number of members:	17

Røyrvik kommunestyre 1987–1991
Party name (in Norwegian)	Number of representatives
Labour Party (Arbeiderpartiet)	7
Socialist Left Party (Sosialistisk Venstreparti)	1
Liberal Party (Venstre)	2
Joint List in Røyrvik (Samarbeidslista i Røyrvik)	7
Total number of members:	17

Røyrvik kommunestyre 1983–1987
Party name (in Norwegian)	Number of representatives
Labour Party (Arbeiderpartiet)	7
Socialist Left Party (Sosialistisk Venstreparti)	2
Joint List and Liberal Party (Samarbeidslista og Venstre)	8
Total number of members:	17

Røyrvik kommunestyre 1979–1983
Party name (in Norwegian)	Number of representatives
Labour Party (Arbeiderpartiet)	8
Liberal Party (Venstre)	2
Joint list (Samarbeidsliste)	7
Total number of members:	17

Røyrvik kommunestyre 1975–1979
Party name (in Norwegian)	Number of representatives
Labour Party (Arbeiderpartiet)	6
Socialist Left Party (Sosialistisk Venstreparti)	1
Liberal Party (Venstre)	2
Joint list for independent voters (Samarbeidsliste for Uavhengige Velgere)	8
Total number of members:	17

Røyrvik kommunestyre 1971–1975
Party name (in Norwegian)	Number of representatives
Labour Party (Arbeiderpartiet)	8
Liberal Party (Venstre)	3
Local List(s) (Lokale lister)	6
Total number of members:	17

Røyrvik kommunestyre 1967–1971
Party name (in Norwegian)	Number of representatives
Labour Party (Arbeiderpartiet)	6
Liberal Party (Venstre)	2
Local List(s) (Lokale lister)	5
Total number of members:	13

Røyrvik kommunestyre 1963–1967
Party name (in Norwegian)	Number of representatives
Labour Party (Arbeiderpartiet)	6
Local List(s) (Lokale lister)	7
Total number of members:	13

Røyrvik herredsstyre 1959–1963
Party name (in Norwegian)	Number of representatives
Labour Party (Arbeiderpartiet)	5
Local List(s) (Lokale lister)	8
Total number of members:	13

Røyrvik herredsstyre 1955–1959
Party name (in Norwegian)	Number of representatives
Labour Party (Arbeiderpartiet)	5
Local List(s) (Lokale lister)	8
Total number of members:	13

Røyrvik herredsstyre 1951–1955
Party name (in Norwegian)	Number of representatives
Labour Party (Arbeiderpartiet)	1
Local List(s) (Lokale lister)	11
Total number of members:	12

Røyrvik herredsstyre 1947–1951
Party name (in Norwegian)	Number of representatives
Labour Party (Arbeiderpartiet)	5
Local List(s) (Lokale lister)	7
Total number of members:	12

Røyrvik herredsstyre 1945–1947
Party name (in Norwegian)	Number of representatives
Labour Party (Arbeiderpartiet)	5
Local List(s) (Lokale lister)	7
Total number of members:	12

Røyrvik herredsstyre 1937–1941*
Party name (in Norwegian)	Number of representatives
Labour Party (Arbeiderpartiet)	3
Local List(s) (Lokale lister)	9
Total number of members:	12
Note: Due to the German occupation of Norway during World War II, no elections were held for new municipal councils until after the war ended in 1945.

=== Mayors ===
The mayor (Norwegian: ordfører) of Røyrvik Municipality is the political leader of the municipality and the chairperson of the municipal council. Here is a list of people who have held this position:

- 1923–1934: Jens Ingvald Ornæs (V)
- 1935–1941: Petter Vekterli (KrF)
- 1942–1945: Harald Kleppestø (NS)
- 1945–1963: Petter Vekterli (KrF)
- 1964–1967: Kåre Hunnestad (KrF)
- 1968–1979: Petter Vekterli (KrF)
- 1980–1983: Johan Ole Vekterli (Sp)
- 1984–1985: Inge Staldvik (Ap)
- 1985–1987: Ragnar Ingulfsvann (Ap)
- 1988–1995: Magnar Namsvatn (KrF)
- 1995–2007: Marianne Ornæs (Sp)
- 2007–2011: Magnar Namsvatn (KrF)
- 2011–2015: Arnt Mickelsen (Ap)
- 2015–2023: Hans Oskar Devik (Sp)
- 2023–present: Kennet Tømmermo Reitan (LL)

== Economy ==
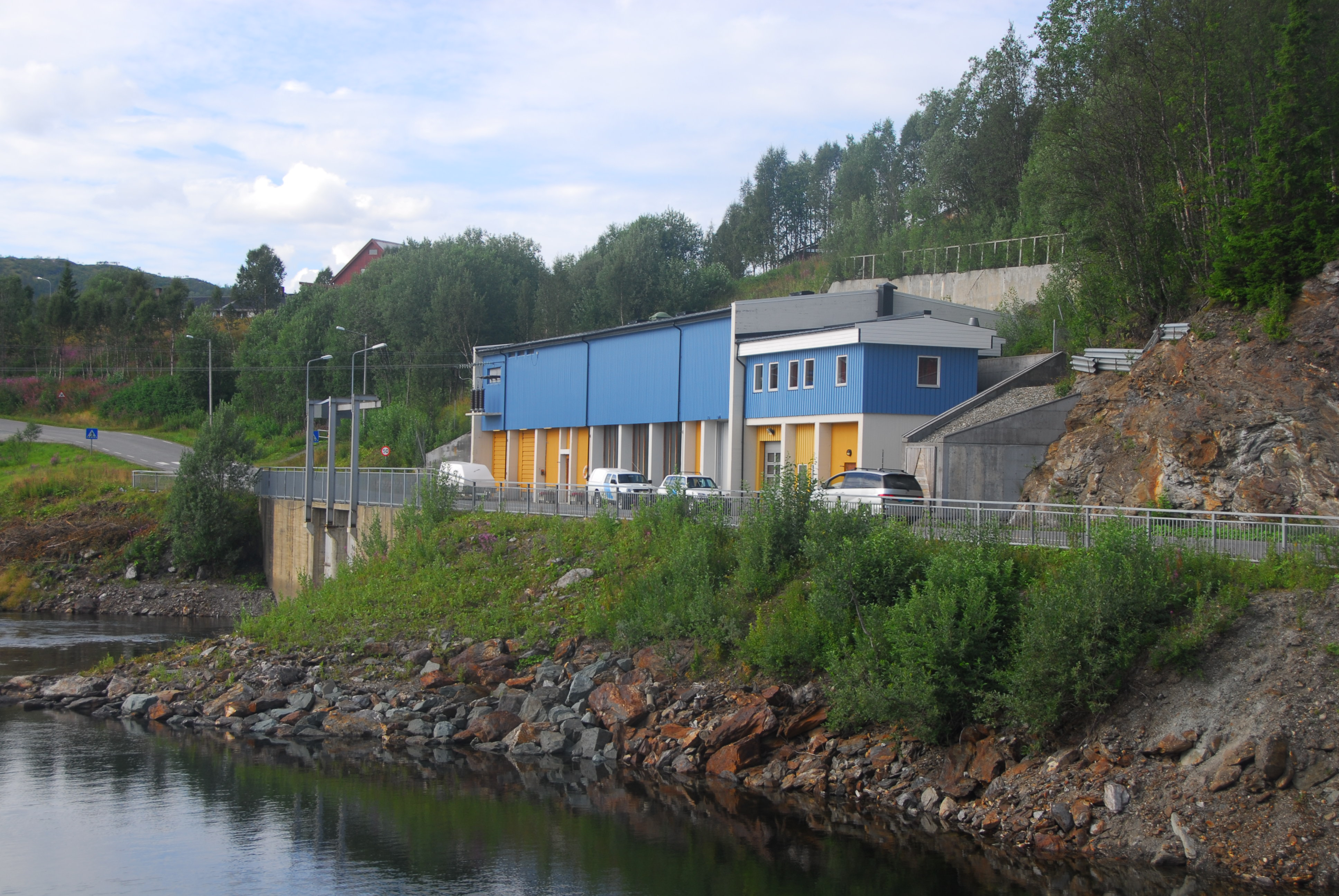
NTE power station in Røyrvik

From 1911 until World War I, mining explorations were conducted in the Gjersvik areas. The modern Grong Gruber mines in were active in the Joma area from 1972 until 1998. Farming and reindeer husbandry have always been a source of income in the area. The mining buildings now house various small industrial firms.

A few efforts to create new business include electronics assembly and electronic document management. A small alpine ski resort (Skisenteret) was started in 1986.

== Notable people ==
- Jan Myrheim (born 1948 in Røyrvik), a physicist and academic
- Inge Staldvik (born 1955), a Norwegian politician and Mayor of Røyrvik from 1983 to 1985
