= Røyrvik (village) =

Village in Røyrvik Municipality, Norway

Røyrvik (Norwegian) Raarvihke (Southern Sami)
- Village
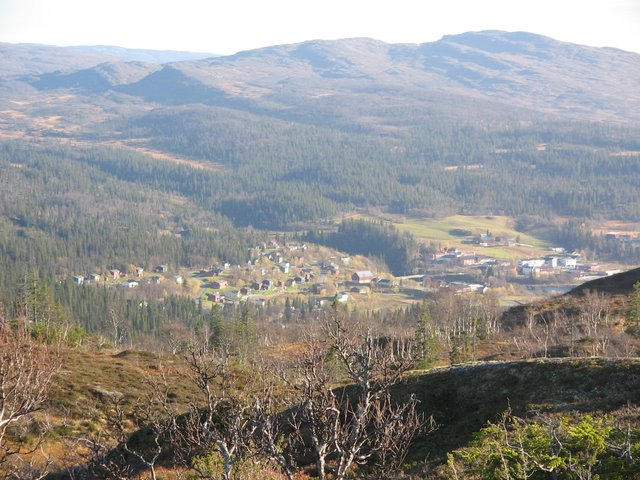
- View of the village
- Interactive map of Røyrvik (Norwegian); Raarvihke (Southern Sami)
- Location within Trøndelag Location within Norway
- Coordinates: 64.8839°N 13.5626°E
- Country: Norway
- Region: Central Norway
- County: Trøndelag
- District: Namdalen
- Municipality: Røyrvik Municipality

Area
  - Total: 0.38 km^{2} (0.15 sq mi)
- Elevation: 425 m (1,394 ft)

Population (2024)
  - Total: 221
  - Density: 582/km^{2} (1,510/sq mi)
- Time zone: UTC+01:00 (CET)
  - Summer (DST): UTC+02:00 (CEST)
- Post Code: 7898 Limingen

Røyrvik (Norwegian) or Raarvihke (Southern Sami) is the administrative centre in Røyrvik Municipality in Trøndelag county, Norway. The village is located in the central part of the municipality, about 20 kilometres (12 mi) west of the border with Sweden. It sits at the northern end of the large lake Limingen. Børgefjell National Park is located about 20 kilometres (12 mi) to the north. Røyrvik Church is located in the village.

The 0.38-square-kilometre (94-acre) village has a population (2024) of 221 and a population density of 582 inhabitants per square kilometre (1,510/sq mi).

== Name ==
The village (and municipality) is named after the old Røyrvik farm (historically: Røirviken) since the first Røyrvik Church was built there (in 1828). The first element is røyr which means "Arctic char". The last element is vik which means "inlet".
