= Tautersheep =

Breed of sheep

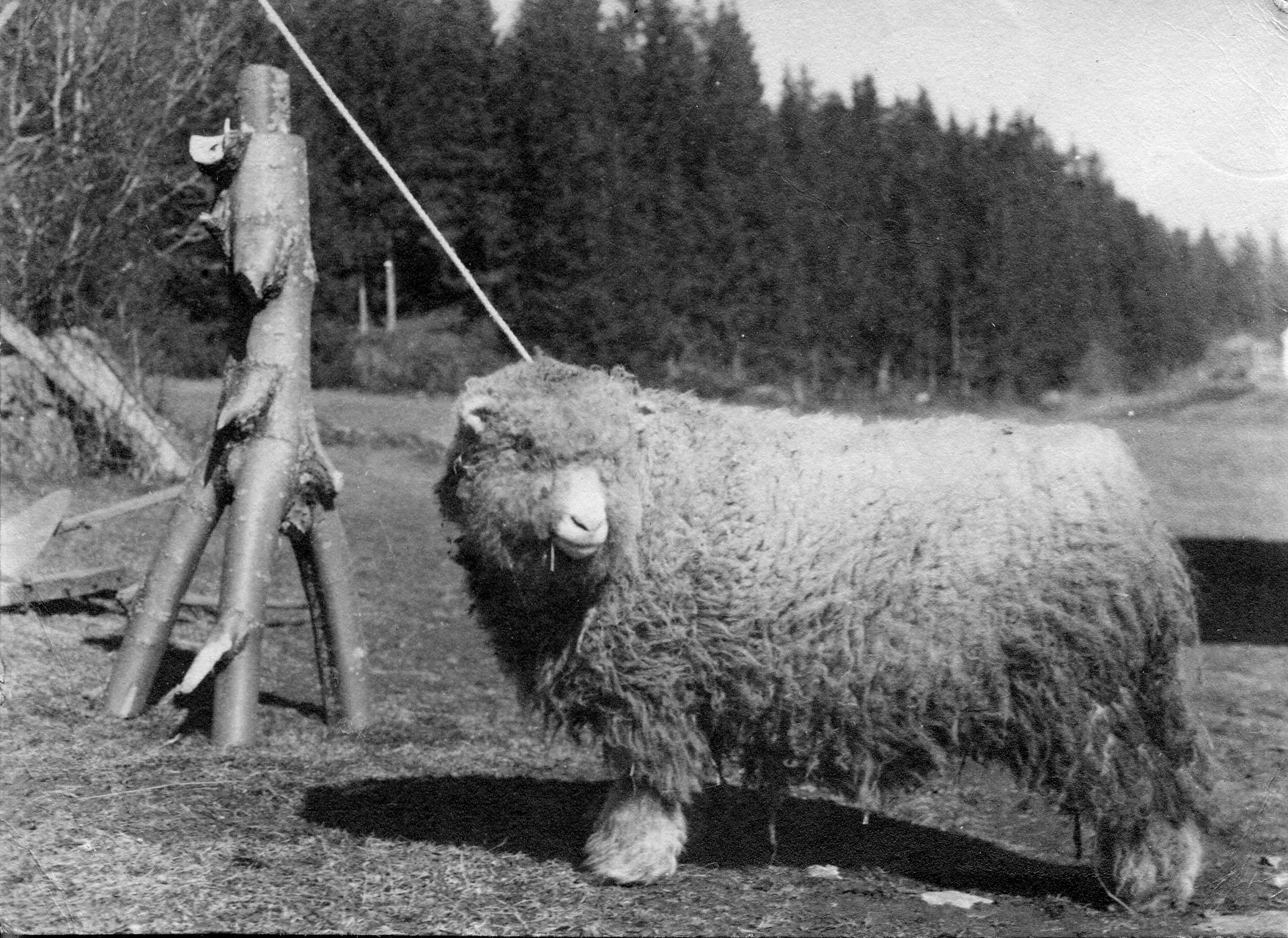
Tautersheep female photographed around 1910

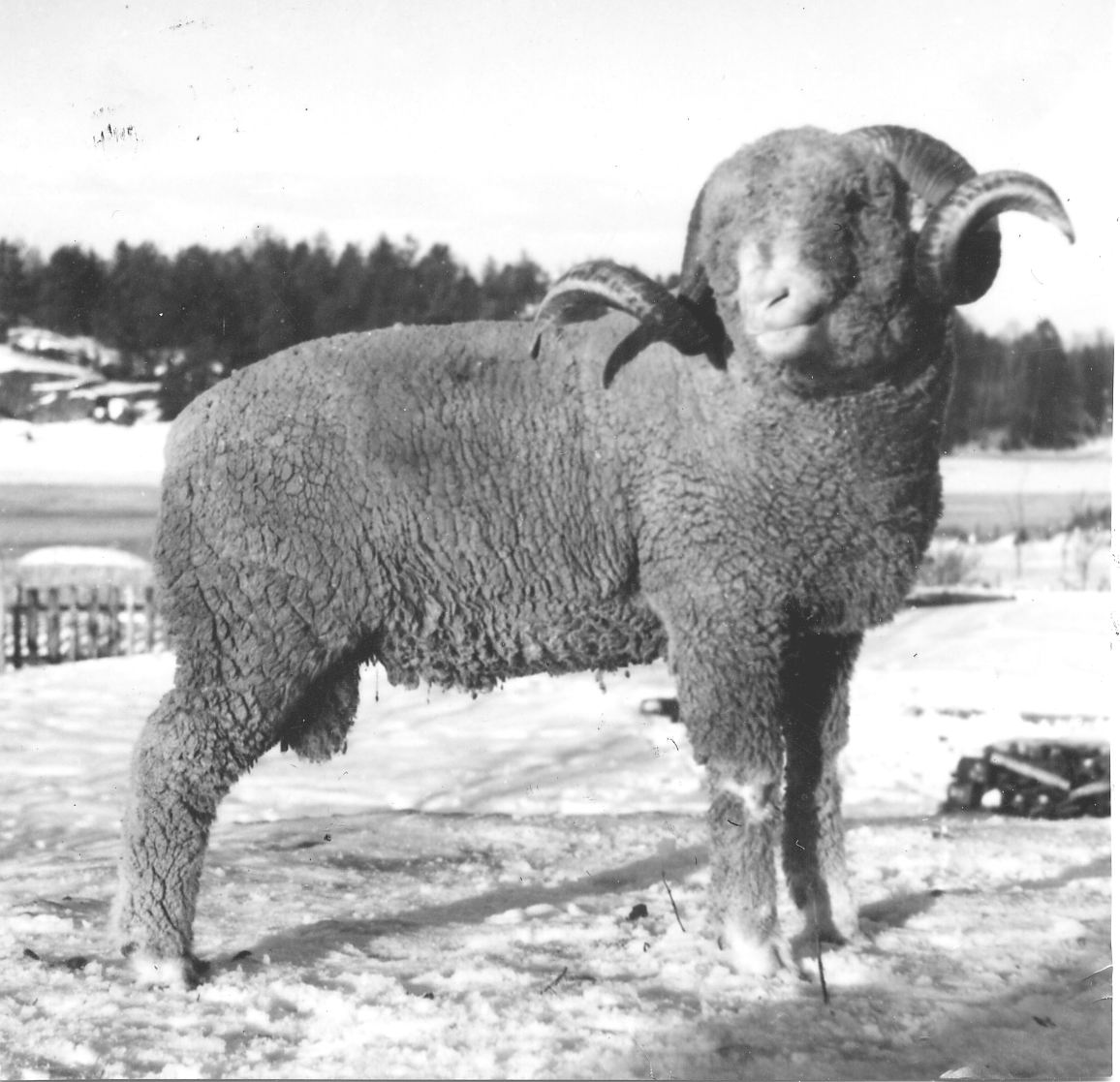
Tautersheep male photographed around 1910

Tautersheep is an extinct breed of sheep from the island of Tautra in Frosta Municipality in Trøndelag county, Norway. It was a sheep with fine wool resembling the Spanish merino. The origin of the breed is disputed, but could possibly be merino sheep brought to Tautra cloister several hundred years ago and afterwards mixed with old Norse sheep. Others have claimed that the origin is the English Ryeland, which suggest that the Tautersheep was a far younger race.

The fine wool made the Tautersheep very popular and at the end of the 19th century it was quite well known, but had problems because the wool had a tendency to grow over the eyes of the animal. As early as 1805 70 Tautersheep were exported to Sweden and in 1884 some were sold to Denmark and later exported to The Faroe Islands. The fertility was low and the sheep had problems with the stony Norwegian terrain. As foreign sheep breeds became more common in Norway in the 20th century the interest in breeding Tautersheep declined.

After the Second World War the individuals of the breed gradually grew fewer and in 1959 only one place bred Tautersheep. Six grown individuals and five lambs were the only ones left. The breeding organisation dismissed the breed and the sheep were advertised, but no buyers turned up. The last Tautersheep were then slaughtered and the breed became extinct.

== Literature ==
- Balvoll, Gudmund (2011) Innføring og kommentarar «En god Bonde, Hans Avl og Biærig av Povel Juel med tillegg av Hans Thode. Tronhiem, 1777» Read online
- Balvoll, Gudmund (2011?) Jordbruket på 1700-talet – teori og praksis : nettbok av Gudmund Balvoll. Read online
- Borgedal, Paul (1967) «Tautersauen». I: Norges Jordbruk i nyere tid, b. 2, s. 81–84. Oslo, Bøndenes forlag
- Hagerup, Aage (1918) «Sauhold». I: Frosta i gammel og ny tid, s. 275–280. Trondhjem, [s.n.]
- Helland, Amund (utg.) (1898) «Søndre Trondhjems Amt - Den almindelige del og Trondhjem», Norges land og folk, b.16:2, s. 98. Kristiania, Olaf Norli. Read online
- Johnsen, F. Loyt (1941) Om gråsauen i Trøndelag. Hovedoppgave, N.L.H., Institutt for Avls- og Raselære
- Kraft, Jens (1835) Topographisk-statistisk Beskrivelse over Kongeriget Norge, b. 5, s. 39. Christiania Read online
- Nedkvitne, Jon J. (1955) «Or soga om merinosauen i Noreg». Tidsskrift for Det norske Landbruk, årg. 62. nr. 1, s. 20–25
- Sæland, Jon (1944) Sau og saustell, s. 37–38. Eget forlag Read online
- Youatt, William (1837): Sheep, their breeding, management and deceases. London, Baldwin & Cradock. Read online
