= Tunnsjøen =

Lake in Trøndelag, Norway

Tunnsjøen (Norwegian) Dåtnejaevrie (Southern Sami)
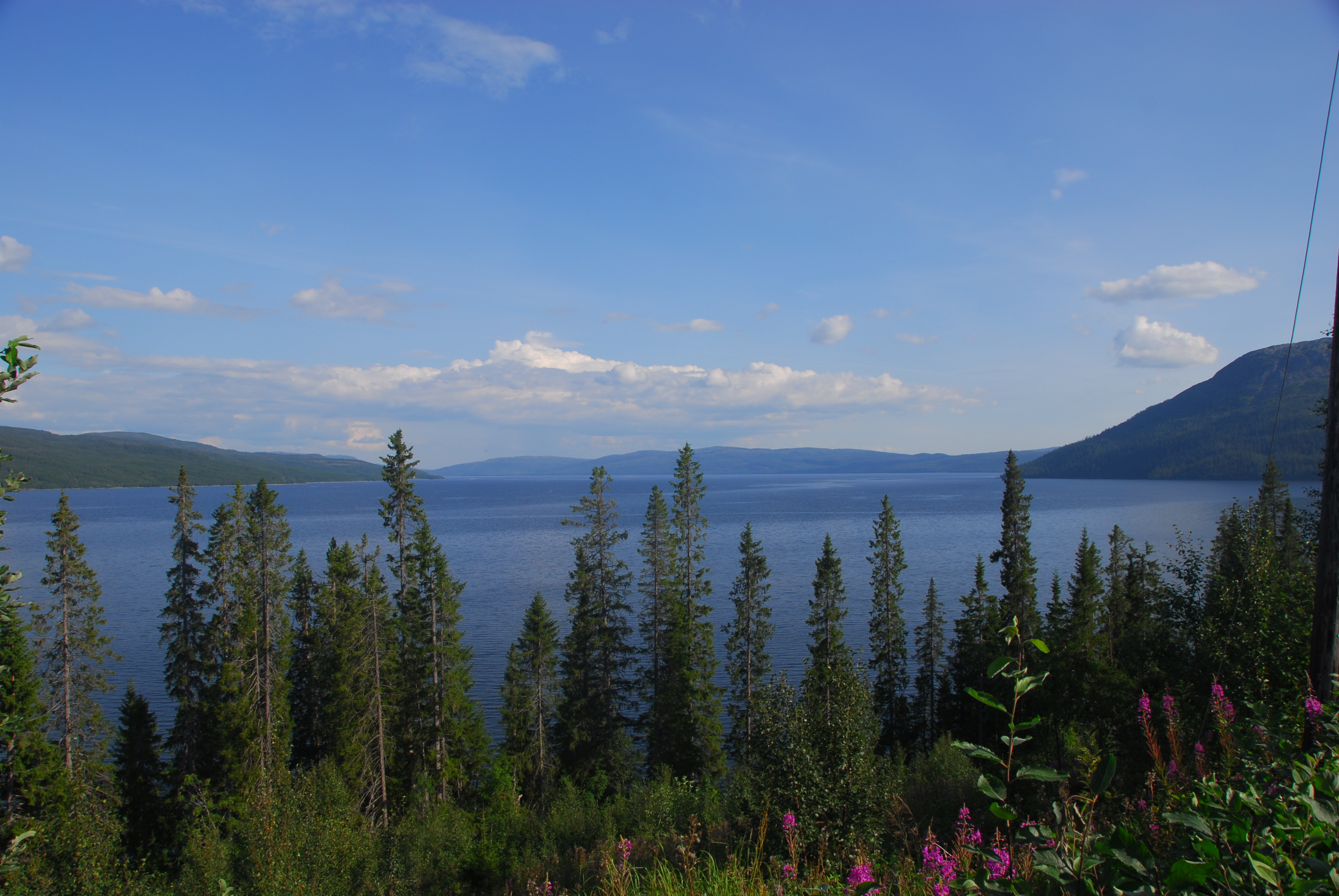
- Tunnsjøen as seen from the north-west shore. Gudfjelløya to the right.
- Interactive map of the lake
- Location: Lierne Municipality and Røyrvik Municipality, Trøndelag
- Coordinates: 64.7050°N 13.2116°E
- Type: glacier lake
- Primary inflows: Ingelsvasselva, Mykkelvikelva, Rørvasselva and Stallvikelva
- Primary outflows: Tunnsjøelva
- Catchment area: 388.68 km^{2} (150.07 sq mi)
- Basin countries: Norway
- Max. length: 20 km (12 mi)
- Max. width: 10 km (6.2 mi)
- Surface area: 100.18 km^{2} (38.68 sq mi)
- Average depth: 88 m (289 ft)
- Max. depth: 222 m (728 ft)
- Water volume: 8.816 km^{3} (2.115 cu mi)
- Shore length^{1}: 118 km (73 mi)
- Surface elevation: 358 m (1,175 ft)
- Islands: Gudfjelløya and Litlfjelløya (or Reinøya)
- References: NVE
- ^{1} Shore length is not a well-defined measure.

Tunnsjøen (Norwegian) or Dåtnejaevrie (Southern Sami) is a lake in Røyrvik Municipality and Lierne Municipality in Trøndelag county, Norway. The 100.18-square-kilometre (38.68 sq mi) lake lies just south of the large lake Limingen, and just west of the border with Sweden. It is 358 m (1,175 ft) above sea level and has a volume of 8.816 km^{3} (2.115 cu mi). The deepest part of the lake is 222 m (728 ft) deep. It is the seventh largest lake in Norway.

== Islands ==
The 6.1-square-kilometre (2.4 sq mi) island Tjåehkere (Southern Sami) or Gudfjelløya (Norwegian) lies in the lake Tunnsjøen. The island's highest point is 812 m (2,664 ft) above sea level; which is 454 m (1,490 ft) higher than the lake. The peak is named Gudfjellet (lit. 'God's Mountain'). This makes Gudfjelløya the highest island within a lake in Norway (and in Europe). It towers higher than the island of Monte Isola within Lake Iseo, in northern Italy. The island is located in the lake's central part. To the southwest of the island is the lake's second largest island: Sodtsååle (Southern Sami), also known as Litlfjelløya or Reinøya (Norwegian) (lit. 'Little Mountain Island' or 'Reindeer Island'). Its highest point is 177 m (581 ft) above the lake's water surface.
