= Trøndelag =

County in Central Norway

Trøndelag County Trøndelag fylke Trööndelagen fylhke
- County
- Trondhjems amt (historic name)
- Rønsholmen Brygger in Ørland

- Flag Coat of arms

- Trøndelag within Norway

- The Trøndelag region in Norway
- Coordinates: 63°25′37″N 10°23′35″E
- Country: Norway
- County: Trøndelag
- Established: 1 Jan 2018
  - Preceded by: Nord-Trøndelag and Sør-Trøndelag counties
- Administrative centre: Steinkjer

Government
  - Body: Trøndelag County Municipality
  - Governor (2018): Frank Jenssen (H)
  - County mayor (2023): Tomas Iver Hallem (Sp)

Area
  - Total: 42,202 km^{2} (16,294 sq mi)
  - Land: 39,494 km^{2} (15,249 sq mi)
  - Water: 2,708 km^{2} (1,046 sq mi) 6.4%
  - Rank: #3 in Norway

Population (2021)
  - Total: 471,124
  - Rank: #5 in Norway
  - Density: 11.9/km^{2} (31/sq mi)
  - Change (10 years): ▲ +9.6%
- Demonym: Trønder

Official language
  - Norwegian form: Neutral
- Time zone: UTC+01:00 (CET)
  - Summer (DST): UTC+02:00 (CEST)
- ISO 3166 code: NO-50
- Website: Official website
Historical population
Year	Pop.	±% p.a.
1769	78,274	—
1951	307,635	+0.75%
1960	327,127	+0.68%
1970	350,297	+0.69%
1980	368,942	+0.52%
1990	377,202	+0.22%
2000	389,960	+0.33%
2010	422,102	+0.80%
2020	468,702	+1.05%
Source: Statistics Norway . 2017 data
Religion membership in Trøndelag
religion	percent
Christianity	88.17%
Islam	0.75%
Buddhism	0.24%
Other	10.84%

Trøndelag (Urban East Norwegian: [ˈtrœ̂ndəˌlɑːɡ]); or Trööndelage (Southern Sami), is a county in central Norway, coextensive with the Trøndelag region (also known as Midt-Norge or Midt-Noreg, lit. "Mid-Norway"). It was created in 1687, then named Trondhjem County (Norwegian: Trondhjems Amt); in 1804 the county was split into Nord-Trøndelag and Sør-Trøndelag by the King of Denmark-Norway. After over two centuries of separation, in 2018 they were reunited following a referendum held two years earlier.

The largest city in Trøndelag is the city of Trondheim. The administrative centre is Steinkjer, while Trondheim functions as the office of the county mayor. Both cities serve the office of the county governor; however, Steinkjer houses the main functions.

Trøndelag county and the neighbouring Møre og Romsdal county together form what is known as Central Norway. A person from Trøndelag is called a trønder. The dialect spoken in the area, trøndersk, is characterized by dropping out most vowel endings; see apocope.

Trøndelag is one of the most fertile regions of Norway, with large agricultural output. The majority of the production ends up in the Norwegian cooperative system for meat and milk, but farm produce is a steadily growing business.

== Name ==
The Old Norse form of the name was Þrǿndalǫg. The first element is the genitive plural of þrǿndr which means "person from Trøndelag", while the second is lǫg (plural of lag which means "law; district/people with a common law" (compare Danelaw, Gulaþingslǫg and Njarðarlǫg). A parallel name for the same district was Þróndheimr which means "the homeland (heim) of the þrǿndr". Þróndheimr may be older since the first element has a stem form without umlaut, cf. the older singular þróndr of þrǿndr (plural).

Þrǿndr also has a cognate in Old English as Þrōwendas (plural), which is the basis of various Modern English translations of the name, such as Throwends and Throwendham.

The county and national governments have also approved a Southern Sami name for the county: Trööndelage. When it is used with the word for county, it is Trööndelagen fylhke.

== History ==
People have lived in this region for thousands of years. In the early iron-age Trøndelag was divided into several petty kingdoms called fylki. The different fylki had a common law, and an early parliament or thing. It was called Frostating and was held at the Frosta peninsula. By some, this is regarded as the first real democracy.

In the time after Håkon Grjotgardsson (838-900), Trøndelag was ruled by the Jarl of Lade. Lade is located in the eastern part of Trondheim, bordering the Trondheimsfjord. The powerful Jarls of Lade continued to play a very significant political role in Norway up to 1030.

Jarls of Lade (Ladejarl) were:

- Håkon Grjotgardsson, the first jarl of Lade.
- Sigurd Håkonsson, son of Håkon. Killed by Harald Greyhide.
- Håkon Sigurdsson, son of Sigurd. Conspired with Harald Bluetooth against Harald Greyhide, and subsequently became vassal of Harald Bluetooth, and in reality independent ruler of Norway. After the arrival of Olaf Trygvason, Håkon quickly lost all support and was killed by his own slave, Tormod Kark, in 995.
- Eirik Håkonsson, son of Håkon. Together with his brother, Svein, governor of Norway under Sweyn Forkbeard of Denmark from 1000 to 1012.
- Håkon Eiriksson, son of Eirik. Governor of Norway under Sweyn Forkbeard of Denmark from 1012 to 1015.

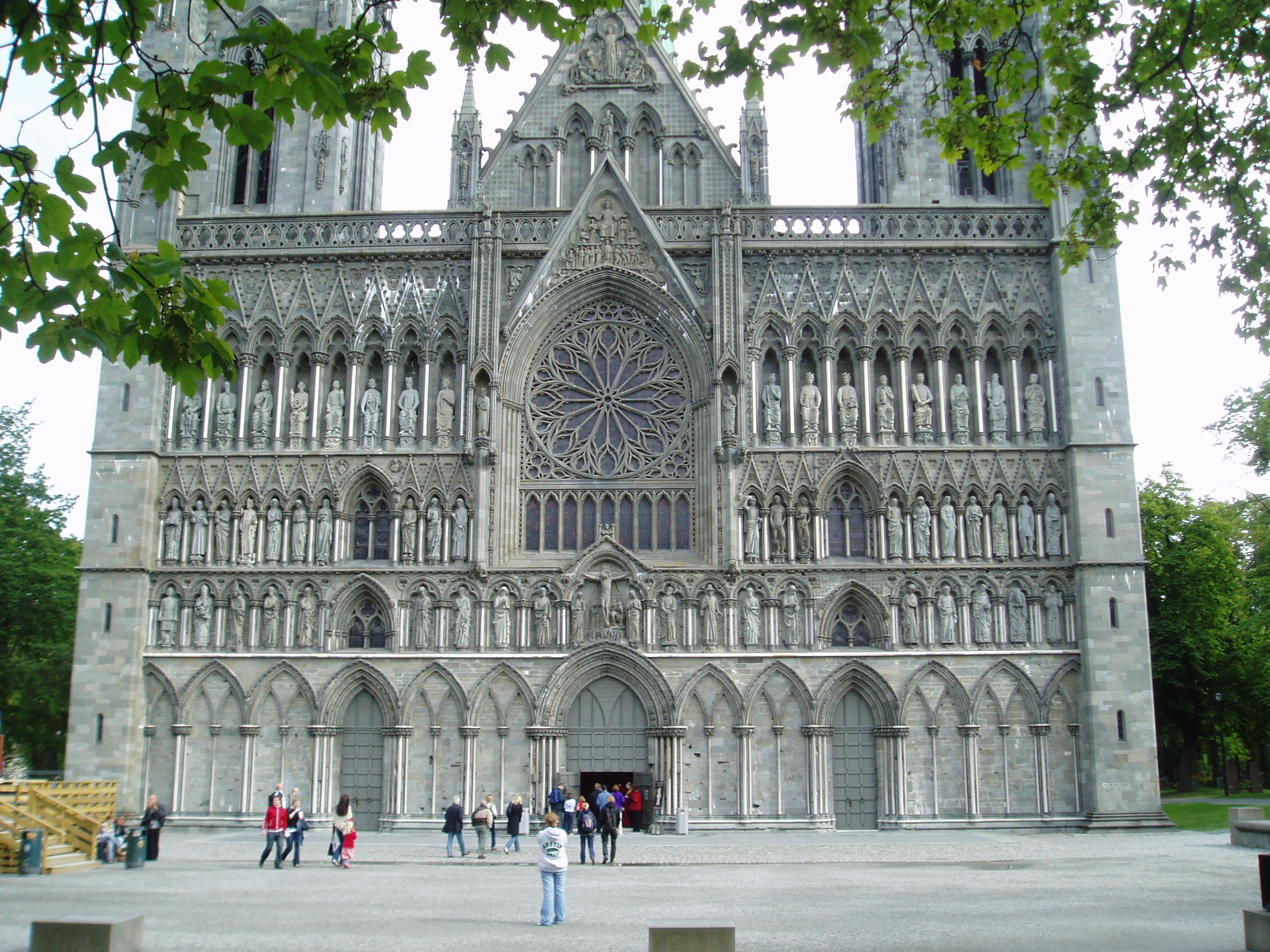
Nidaros Cathedral in Trondheim

Trøndelag (together with parts of Møre og Romsdal) was briefly ceded in 1658 to Sweden in the Treaty of Roskilde and was ruled by king Charles X until it was returned to Denmark-Norway after the Treaty of Copenhagen in 1660. During that time, the Swedes conscripted 2,000 men in Trøndelag, forcing young boys down to 15 years of age to join the Swedish armies fighting against Poland and Brandenburg. Charles X feared the Trønders would rise against their Swedish occupiers, and thought it wise to keep a large part of the men away. Only about one-third of the men ever returned to their homes; some of them were forced to settle in the then Swedish Duchy of Estonia, as the Swedes thought it would be easier to rule the Trønders there, utilising the ancient maxim of divide and rule.

In the fall of 1718, during the Great Northern War, General Carl Gustaf Armfeldt was ordered by king Charles XII of Sweden to lead a Swedish army of 10,000 men into Trøndelag to take Trondheim. Because of his poor supply lines back to Sweden, Armfeldt's army had to live off the land, causing great suffering to the people of the region. Armfeldt's campaign failed: the defenders of Trondheim succeeded in repelling his siege. After Charles XII was killed in the siege of Fredriksten in Norway's southeast, Armfeldt was ordered back into Sweden. During the ensuing retreat, his 6,000 surviving threadbare and starving Caroleans were caught in a fierce blizzard. Thousands of Caroleans froze to death in the Norwegian mountains, and hundreds more were crippled for life.

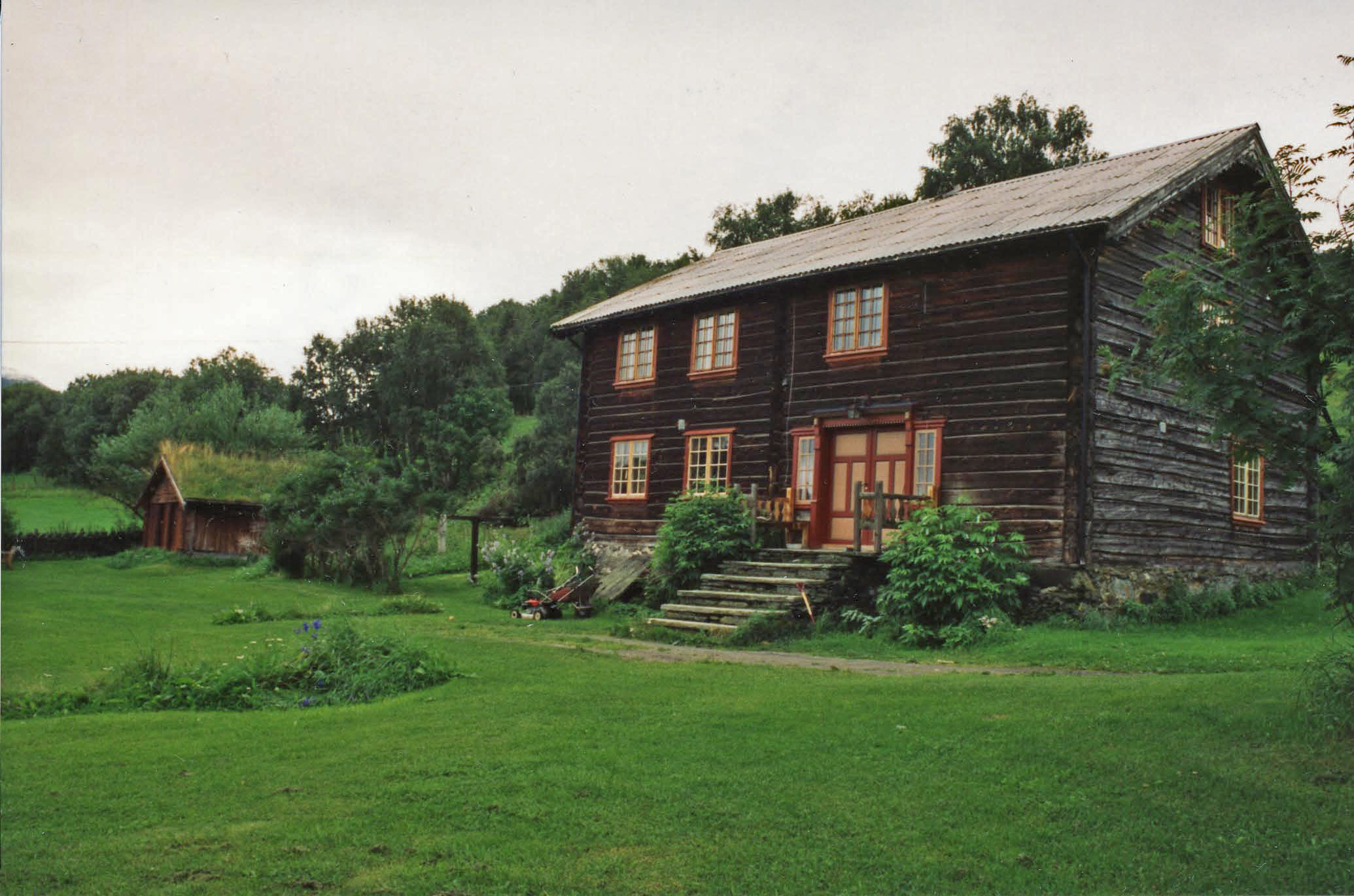
Traditional Trøndelag house

== Government ==
The county is governed by the Trøndelag County Municipality. The town of Steinkjer is the seat of the county governor and county administration. However, both the county governor and Trøndelag County Municipality also have offices in Trondheim.

The county oversees the 41 upper secondary schools, including nine private schools. Six of the schools have more than 1000 students: four in Trondheim plus the Steinkjer Upper Secondary School and the Ole Vig Upper Secondary School in Stjørdalshalsen. The county has ten Folk high schools, with an eleventh folk high school being possibly being opened in Røros, with a possible start in 2019.

=== Districts ===
The county is often sub-divided into several geographical regions:

- Namdal, the greater Namsen river valley
- Fosen, the Fosen peninsula and surrounding areas
- Innherred, the areas surrounding the inner Trondheimsfjorden
- Stjørdalen, the Stjørdalen valley
- Trondheim Region, the areas surrounding the large city of Trondheim
- Gauldalen, the Gaula river valley
- Orkdalen, the Orkla river valley

=== Towns and cities ===
There are ten towns/cities in Trøndelag, plus the "mining town" of Røros.

- Trondheim (in Trondheim Municipality)
- Steinkjer (in Steinkjer Municipality)
- Stjørdalshalsen (in Stjørdal Municipality)
- Levanger (in Levanger Municipality)
- Namsos (in Namsos Municipality)
- Rørvik (in Nærøysund Municipality)
- Verdalsøra (in Verdal Municipality)
- Orkanger (in Orkdal Municipality)
- Brekstad (in Ørland Municipality)
- Kolvereid (in Nærøy Municipality)
- Bergstaden Røros (in Røros Municipality)

== Geography ==
Along the coast in the southwest are the largest islands in Norway south of the Arctic Circle, including Hitra and Frøya. The broad and long Trondheimsfjord is a main feature, and the lowland surrounding the fjord are among the most important agricultural areas in Norway. In the far south is the mountain ranges Dovrefjell and Trollheimen, and in the southeast is highlands and mountain plateaus, and this is where Røros is situated. The highest mountain is the 1,985-metre (6,512 ft) tall Storskrymten, which is located in the county border between Møre og Romsdal, Innlandet, and Trøndelag. North of the Trondheimsfjord is the large Fosen peninsula, where Ørland Municipality is at its southwestern tip. Several valleys runs north or west to meet the fjord, with a river at its centre, such as Meldal, Gauldal, Stjørdal, Verdal. Further north is the long Namdalen with the largest river, Namsen, and Namsos is situated where the river meets the Namsen fjord. The rivers are among the best salmon rivers in Europe, especially Namsen, Gaula, and Orkla. On the northwestern part of the region is the Vikna archipelago with almost 6,000 islands and islets.

There are many national parks in the region, including Dovrefjell–Sunndalsfjella National Park, Forollhogna National Park, Skarvan and Roltdalen National Park, Femundsmarka National Park and Børgefjell National Park.

== Climate ==
Trøndelag is one of the regions in Norway with the largest climatic variation – from the oceanic climate with mild and wetter winters along the coast to the very cold winters in the southeast inland highlands, where Røros is the only place in southern and central Norway to have recorded −50 °C (−58 °F). The first overnight freeze (temperature below −0 °C (32 °F) in autumn on average is August 24th in Røros, October 9th at Trondheim Airport Værnes, and as late as November 20th at Sula in Frøya. Most of the lowland areas near the fjords have a humid continental climate (or oceanic if -3C is used as winter threshold), while the most oceanic areas along the coast have a temperate oceanic climate with all monthly means above 0 °C (32 °F). The inland valleys, hills, and highlands below the treeline have a boreal climate with cold winters and shorter summers, but still with potential for warm summer temperatures. Above the treeline is alpine tundra.

Climate data for Sula, Frøya 1991–2020 (5 m, extremes 1975–2024)
Month	Jan	Feb	Mar	Apr	May	Jun	Jul	Aug	Sep	Oct	Nov	Dec	Year
Record high °C (°F)	10.3 (50.5)	9.9 (49.8)	12.6 (54.7)	19.3 (66.7)	24.6 (76.3)	27.7 (81.9)	28.5 (83.3)	26.3 (79.3)	22.7 (72.9)	18.8 (65.8)	14.6 (58.3)	11.1 (52.0)	28.5 (83.3)
Mean daily maximum °C (°F)	4.6 (40.3)	4.2 (39.6)	5.2 (41.4)	7.6 (45.7)	10.4 (50.7)	13 (55)	15.6 (60.1)	16.1 (61.0)	13.8 (56.8)	9.8 (49.6)	6.9 (44.4)	5.5 (41.9)	9.4 (48.9)
Daily mean °C (°F)	3.1 (37.6)	2.5 (36.5)	3.2 (37.8)	5.4 (41.7)	8 (46)	10.7 (51.3)	13 (55)	13.7 (56.7)	11.8 (53.2)	8.3 (46.9)	5.5 (41.9)	3.8 (38.8)	7.4 (45.3)
Mean daily minimum °C (°F)	1.2 (34.2)	0.9 (33.6)	1.6 (34.9)	3.5 (38.3)	6 (43)	8.9 (48.0)	11.3 (52.3)	12.2 (54.0)	10.2 (50.4)	6.6 (43.9)	3.7 (38.7)	2.1 (35.8)	5.7 (42.3)
Record low °C (°F)	−12.3 (9.9)	−12.7 (9.1)	−8.1 (17.4)	−3.6 (25.5)	−0.3 (31.5)	2.7 (36.9)	5 (41)	7.1 (44.8)	2 (36)	−1.1 (30.0)	−7 (19)	−10.9 (12.4)	−12.7 (9.1)
Average precipitation mm (inches)	92 (3.6)	75 (3.0)	80 (3.1)	55 (2.2)	46 (1.8)	53 (2.1)	57 (2.2)	74 (2.9)	104 (4.1)	88 (3.5)	108 (4.3)	113 (4.4)	945 (37.2)
Source 1: Norwegian Meteorological Institute
Source 2: NOAA-WMO averages 91-2020 Norway

Climate data for Trondheim Airport Værnes 1991–2020 (12 m, extremes 1946–2024, sunhrs 2016–2020)
Month	Jan	Feb	Mar	Apr	May	Jun	Jul	Aug	Sep	Oct	Nov	Dec	Year
Record high °C (°F)	13.7 (56.7)	13.8 (56.8)	15.7 (60.3)	23.3 (73.9)	30 (86)	34.3 (93.7)	33.5 (92.3)	31.3 (88.3)	27.9 (82.2)	22.1 (71.8)	16.1 (61.0)	13.1 (55.6)	34.3 (93.7)
Mean daily maximum °C (°F)	1.9 (35.4)	2.0 (35.6)	4.6 (40.3)	9.3 (48.7)	13.8 (56.8)	17.1 (62.8)	19.8 (67.6)	19.1 (66.4)	15.0 (59.0)	9.3 (48.7)	4.7 (40.5)	2.3 (36.1)	9.9 (49.8)
Daily mean °C (°F)	−1 (30)	−1.1 (30.0)	1 (34)	5.1 (41.2)	9.2 (48.6)	12.6 (54.7)	15.2 (59.4)	14.6 (58.3)	11 (52)	5.8 (42.4)	1.7 (35.1)	−0.7 (30.7)	6.1 (43.0)
Mean daily minimum °C (°F)	−4.1 (24.6)	−4.1 (24.6)	−2.2 (28.0)	1.4 (34.5)	5.3 (41.5)	8.9 (48.0)	11.4 (52.5)	11.0 (51.8)	7.8 (46.0)	2.9 (37.2)	−1.1 (30.0)	−3.9 (25.0)	2.8 (37.0)
Record low °C (°F)	−25.6 (−14.1)	−25.5 (−13.9)	−23.0 (−9.4)	−13.9 (7.0)	−4.7 (23.5)	−0.2 (31.6)	2.3 (36.1)	−0.3 (31.5)	−4.9 (23.2)	−10.8 (12.6)	−19.0 (−2.2)	−23.5 (−10.3)	−25.6 (−14.1)
Average precipitation mm (inches)	64.6 (2.54)	63.9 (2.52)	61.3 (2.41)	42.1 (1.66)	52.7 (2.07)	76.1 (3.00)	74.4 (2.93)	82.8 (3.26)	88.9 (3.50)	77 (3.0)	64.4 (2.54)	75 (3.0)	823.2 (32.43)
Average precipitation days (≥ 1.0 mm)	13	13	13	10	11	13	12	13	13	13	11	14	149
Mean monthly sunshine hours	34	71	124	205	236	234	229	167	130	116	46	16	1,608
Source 1: Seklima
Source 2: NOAA-WMO averages 91-2020 Norway

=== Trøndelag ===
There are 38 municipalities in Trøndelag.

Municipal Number	Name	Adm. Centre	Location in the county	Established	Old Municipal No. (before 2020)	Former County
5001	Trondheim Municipality	Trondheim		1 Jan 1838	5001 Trondheim Municipality; 5030 Klæbu Municipality	Trøndelag
5006	Steinkjer Municipality	Steinkjer		23 Jan 1858	5006 Steinkjer Municipality; 5039 Verran Municipality	Trøndelag
5007	Namsos Municipality	Namsos		1 Jan 1846	5005 Namsos Municipality; 5040 Namdalseid Municipality; 5048 Fosnes Municipality	Trøndelag
5014	Frøya Municipality	Sistranda		1 Jan 1964	1620 Frøya Municipality	Sør-Trøndelag
5020	Osen Municipality	Steinsdalen		1 June 1892	1633 Osen Municipality	Sør-Trøndelag
5021	Oppdal Municipality	Oppdal		1 Jan 1838	1634 Oppdal Municipality	Sør-Trøndelag
5022	Rennebu Municipality	Berkåk		1 Jan 1839	1635 Rennebu Municipality	Sør-Trøndelag
5025	Røros Municipality	Røros		1 Jan 1838	1640 Røros Municipality	Sør-Trøndelag
5026	Holtålen Municipality	Renbygda		1 Jan 1838	1644 Holtålen Municipality	Sør-Trøndelag
5027	Midtre Gauldal Municipality	Støren		1 Jan 1964	1648 Midtre Gauldal Municipality	Sør-Trøndelag
5028	Melhus Municipality	Melhus		1 Jan 1838	1653 Melhus Municipality	Sør-Trøndelag
5029	Skaun Municipality	Børsa		1 Jan 1890	1657 Skaun Municipality	Sør-Trøndelag
5031	Malvik Municipality	Hommelvik		1 Jan 1891	1663 Malvik Municipality	Sør-Trøndelag
5032	Selbu Municipality	Mebonden		1 Jan 1838	1664 Selbu Municipality	Sør-Trøndelag
5033	Tydal Municipality	Ås		1 Jan 1901	1665 Tydal Municipality	Sør-Trøndelag
5034	Meråker Municipality	Midtbygda		1 Jan 1874	1711 Meråker Municipality	Nord-Trøndelag
5035	Stjørdal Municipality	Stjørdalshalsen		1 Jan 1902	1714 Stjørdal Municipality	Nord-Trøndelag
5036	Frosta Municipality	Frosta		1 Jan 1838	1717 Frosta Municipality	Nord-Trøndelag
5037	Levanger Municipality	Levanger		1 Jan 1838	1719 Levanger Municipality	Nord-Trøndelag
5038	Verdal Municipality	Verdalsøra		1 Jan 1838	1721 Verdal Municipality	Nord-Trøndelag
5041	Snåsa Municipality	Snåsa		1 Jan 1838	1736 Snåsa Municipality	Nord-Trøndelag
5042	Lierne Municipality	Sandvika		1 Jan 1964	1738 Lierne Municipality	Nord-Trøndelag
5043	Røyrvik Municipality	Røyrvik		1 July 1923	1739 Røyrvik Municipality	Nord-Trøndelag
5044	Namsskogan Municipality	Namsskogan		1 July 1923	1740 Namsskogan Municipality	Nord-Trøndelag
5045	Grong Municipality	Medjå		1 Jan 1838	1742 Grong Municipality	Nord-Trøndelag
5046	Høylandet Municipality	Høylandet		1 Jan 1901	1743 Høylandet Municipality	Nord-Trøndelag
5047	Overhalla Municipality	Ranemsletta		1 Jan 1838	1744 Overhalla Municipality	Nord-Trøndelag
5049	Flatanger Municipality	Lauvsnes		1 Jan 1871	1749 Flatanger Municipality	Nord-Trøndelag
5052	Leka Municipality	Leknes		1 Oct 1860	1755 Leka Municipality	Nord-Trøndelag
5053	Inderøy Municipality	Straumen		1 Jan 1838	1756 Inderøy Municipality; 1723 Mosvik Municipality	Nord-Trøndelag
5054	Indre Fosen Municipality	Årnset		1 Jan 2018	1624 Rissa Municipality	Sør-Trøndelag
5054	Indre Fosen Municipality	Årnset		1 Jan 2018	1718 Leksvik Municipality	Nord-Trøndelag
5055	Heim Municipality	Kyrksæterøra		1 Jan 2020	1571 Halsa Municipality	Møre og Romsdal
5055	Heim Municipality	Kyrksæterøra		1 Jan 2020	5011 Hemne Municipality; 5012 Snillfjord Municipality (part)	Trøndelag
5056	Hitra Municipality	Fillan		1 Jan 1838	5013 Hitra Municipality; 5012 Snillfjord Municipality (part)	Trøndelag
5057	Ørland Municipality	Botngård		1 Jan 1838	5015 Ørland Municipality; 5017 Bjugn Municipality	Trøndelag
5058	Åfjord Municipality	Årnes		1 Jan 1838	5018 Åfjord Municipality; 5019 Roan Municipality	Trøndelag
5059	Orkland Municipality	Orkanger		1 Jan 2020	5012 Snillfjord Municipality (part); 5016 Agdenes Municipality; 5023 Meldal Municipality; 5024 Orkdal Municipality	Trøndelag
5060	Nærøysund Municipality	Kolvereid and Rørvik		1 Jan 2020	5050 Vikna Municipality; 5051 Nærøy Municipality	Trøndelag
5061	Rindal Municipality	Rindal		1 Jan 1858	1567 Rindal Municipality	Møre og Romsdal

=== Other municipalities ===
Kristiansund Municipality in Møre og Romsdal held a referendum on 17 January 2022 on whether to move from Møre og Romsdal to Trøndelag, which was rejected; 36.77% voted to move, while 63.23% voted to stay. Similar referendums were hosted and rejected the preceding autumn in Aure Municipality on 13 September 2021 (45% to move, 51% to stay), and in Smøla Municipality on 26 September 2021 (27.24% to move, 70.23% to stay).

Bindal Municipality in Nordland was originally decreed by Stortinget on 8 June 2017 to become part of Nærøysund (and thus become part of Trøndelag), but the decision was reversed after another hearing on 21 November 2017, well in advance of Nærøysund becoming a municipality on 1 January 2020.

== Culture ==
=== Arts ===
The region's official theatre is the Trøndelag Teater in Trondheim. At Stiklestad in Verdal Municipality, the historical play called The Saint Olav Drama has been played each year since 1954. It depicts the last days of Saint Olaf.

Jazz on a very high level is frequently heard in Trondheim, due to the high-level jazz education in Trondheim at Institutt for musikk (NTNU). Trondheim is also the national centre of rock music; the popular music museum Rockheim opened there in 2010. Trøndelag is known for its local variety of rock music, often performed in local dialect, called "trønderrock".

Several institutions are nationally funded, including the internationally acclaimed Trondheim Symphony Orchestra, Trondheim Soloists, Olavsfestdagene and Trondheim Chamber Music Festival.

=== Food and drink ===
The region is popularly known for its moonshine homebrew, called heimbrent or heimert. Although officially prohibited, the art of producing as pure homemade spirits as possible still has a strong following in parts of Trøndelag. Traditionally the spirit is served mixed with coffee to create a drink called karsk. The strength of the coffee varies, often on a regional basis. The mixing proportions also depend on the strength of the spirit with more coffee being used for spirit with higher alcohol content. In southern regions, people tend to use strong filter coffee, while in the north they typically serve karsk with as weak coffee as possible.

The "official dish" of the region is sodd which is made from diced sheep or beef meat and meatballs in boiled stock.

=== Sports ===
Association football and handball are widely played and watched throughout the county. As of 26 January 2024, teams in tier 1 through 3 in men's football include Rosenborg BK, Ranheim Fotball, Levanger FK, IL Stjørdals-Blink, and Strindheim IL. Tier 1 through 3 in women's football include Rosenborg BK Kvinner, KIL/Hemne, and Tiller IL.

In men's handball, tier 1 and 2 include Kolstad Håndball, Melhus IL, and Charlottenlund SK, while in women's handball, tier 1 and 2 include Byåsen HE and Levanger Håndballklubb.

Fosenhallen outside Botngård in southwestern Fosen, is Norway's only full-size speed skating hall north of Hamar. While the hall has never hosted a top level senior ISU Speed Skating World Cup event, it has frequently hosted Norwegian championships and junior world tour events.

The final two stages of the 2022 Arctic Race of Norway were held within the county, as were the Norwegian road racing championships in 2010, 2017, and 2022. Trondheim is also the starting point of the Styrkeprøven ≥500km endurance road race held most years since 1967, which heads down European route E6 through Trøndelag until Hjerkinn, after which point the race heads down to Oslo or just north of Oslo.

Hitra Municipality and Frøya Municipality compete in the Island Games, though Norwegian press coverage outside the islands about their participations are virtually non-existent.

== Agriculture ==
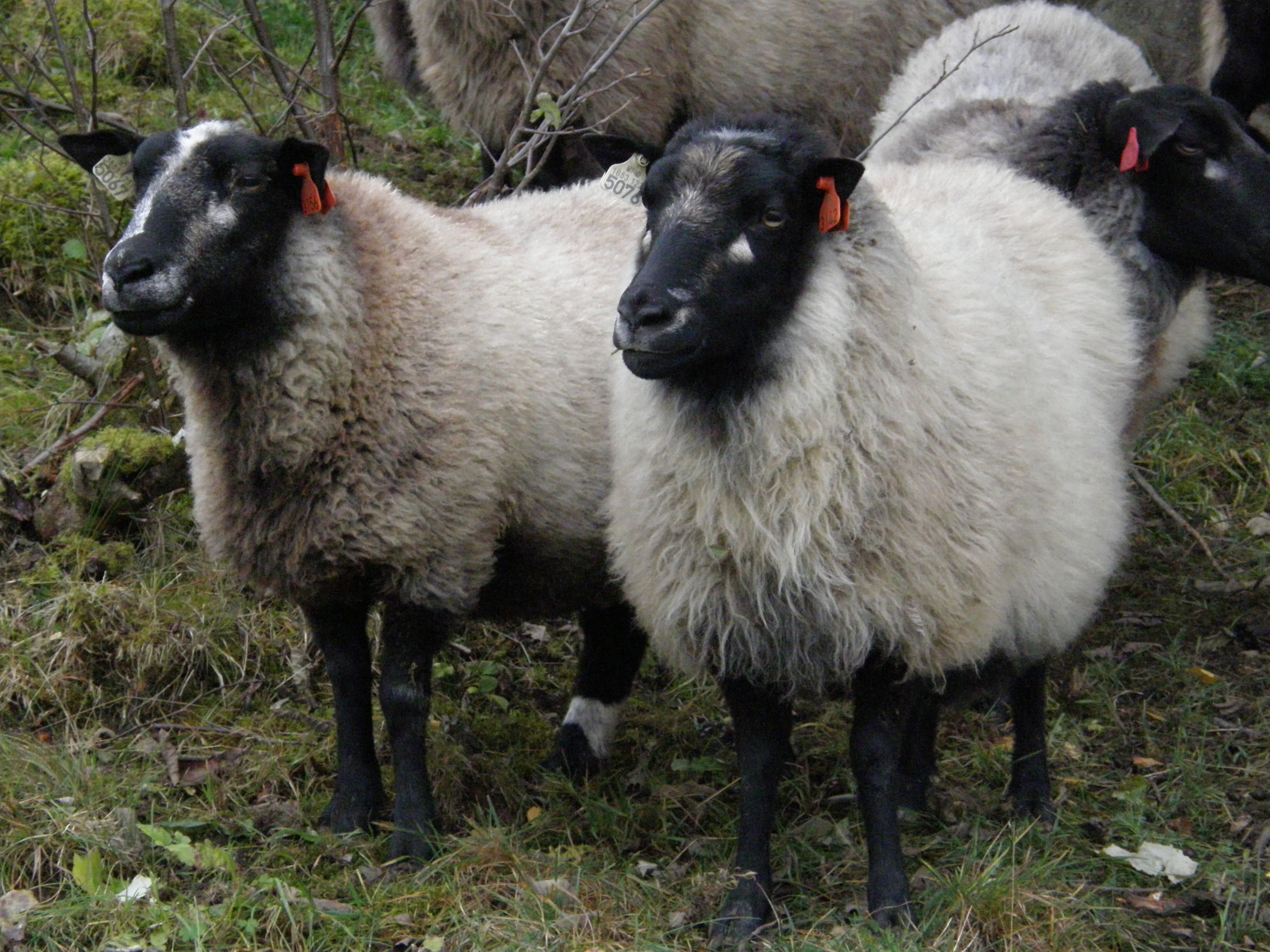
Grey Troender sheep, a breed which originated in Trøndelag

Trøndelag is covered with fertile lands, especially the lowlands surrounding the Korsfjord, Trondheimsfjord, Borgenfjord, and Beitstadfjord. Trøndelag is the third largest county in Norway by agricultural land with its 1,789 square kilometres (691 sq mi), and has the second highest meat-output with a total of almost 75,000 tonnes (74,000 long tons; 83,000 short tons) in 2022. The county also houses the most milking-cows, and thereby has the highest milk output, with Steinkjer Municipality producing the most.

In 2018, Trøndelag was the largest provider of beef, chicken, milk and eggs in Norway. Trøndelag provided 21.1% of all milk production, 18.9% of all beef, 28.7% of all chicken, 23.5% of all eggs, 13.2% of cereals, and 23.2% of all hay produced in Norway. Trøndelag is very much a rural county, housing merely 8.7% of Norway's population.

=== Domestic Breeds ===
Trøndelag is the origin of multiple animal breeds, the best known being Grey Troender sheep and Sided Troender cattle (STN).

Sided Troender cattle, as the name implies, is a white cow with coloured sides. It is based on "Rørosfe" from the Røros area, but later merged with the less standardized Nordland cattle. Together they are viewed as one breed with roots in both Trøndelag and Nordland, and has been since the 1920s. The breed standards are based on the original Trønder standards rather than the looser Nordland standards, with some cows being red, prioritizing black sides on hornless white cows. These are the traits most reminiscing of the old "Rørosfe".

Red Troender cattle is a now extinct breed based on the Scottish Ayrshire cattle. This domestic breed of horned red cows was mixed into extinction in the 1960s, and is now succeeded by Norwegian Red Cattle (NRF).

Tautersheep (Tautersau) was a breed of sheep from the island Tautra in Frosta Municipality, which was and still is heavily populated by monks, who have held sheep since the 11th century. It is thought that the breed is a fork of Spanish Merino sheep brought to Norway by monks during the 1500s. This theory has little written evidence to support it, which may be explained by Spains monopoly on Merino sheep until the 1800s, and export of the breed was punishable by death. Another theory is that the fine wool-features come from Moroccan sheep that were left on some islands outside Frøya. The presence of Moroccan sheep on Tarva was documented in 1757, and they are thought to have been brought inland. What is known for certain is that Hertfordshire Ryelander rams were imported in the late 1700s to mate with the local Tautra sheep. The Norwegian government held a breeding station on Edøy, that was laid to waste by invading forces during WWII. Despite a couple of decentralized breeding stations the population was too low, and to prevent inbreeding it was mixed, amongst others with Old Norwegian Sheep, to improve the quality of other breeds.

Grey Troender sheep is an endangered domesticated breed counting only 50 specimens in the year 2000. The crossbreeding to create the Grey Troender started in the late 1800s with heavy influence from Old Norwegian Sheep and Tautersheep. To protect this breed the government subsidises breeders. By 2011 the population had grown to 1200, whereof 500 are fertile ewes, distributed among 35 herds, and efforts are being made to revive the breed. The Committee on Farm Animal Genetic Resources has collected and frozen 3500 sperm-samples for future breeding.

Troender Rabbit (Trønderkanin) Is the only domestic Norwegian breed of rabbit. The breed was very popular during WWII as it grew fast and provided a fair amount of meat. Interest in the breed tapered off in the 1970s, and the population was as low as 40 specimens in the 1990s. The population in 2017 was around 80 specimens.f

== See also ==
- Demographics of Trøndelag
