= Nordli =

Nordli may refer to:

== People ==
- Nordli (surname) and Nordlie, lists of people with the surname Nordli

== Places ==
- Nordli Municipality, a former municipality in the old Nord-Trøndelag county, Norway
- Nordli Church, a church in Lierne Municipality in Trøndelag county, Norway

== Other ==
- Nordli's Cabinet, the government of Norway from 1976-1981
