= Nordli Municipality =

Former municipality in Trøndelag, Norway

Nordli Municipality Nordli herred
- Former municipality
- Nord-Trøndelag within Norway

- Nordli within Nord-Trøndelag
- Coordinates: 64°28′03″N 13°35′27″E
- Country: Norway
- County: Nord-Trøndelag
- District: Namdalen
- Established: 1 July 1915
  - Preceded by: Lierne Municipality
- Disestablished: 1 Jan 1964
  - Succeeded by: Lierne Municipality
- Administrative centre: Sandvika

Government
  - Mayor (1952–1963): Ola H. Kveli (V)

Area (upon dissolution)
  - Total: 1,537.9 km^{2} (593.8 sq mi)
  - Rank: #41 in Norway
- Highest elevation: 1,390 m (4,560 ft)

Population (1963)
  - Total: 1,180
  - Rank: #585 in Norway
  - Density: 0.8/km^{2} (2.1/sq mi)
  - Change (10 years): ▲ +11%
- Demonym: Libygg

Official language
  - Norwegian form: Neutral
- Time zone: UTC+01:00 (CET)
  - Summer (DST): UTC+02:00 (CEST)
- ISO 3166 code: NO-1738

Nordli is a former municipality in the old Nord-Trøndelag county in Norway. The 1,538-square-kilometre (594 sq mi) municipality existed from 1915 until its dissolution in 1964. The area is now the northern part of Lierne Municipality in Trøndelag county. The administrative centre for the municipality was the village of Sandvika where the Nordli Church is located.

Prior to its dissolution in 1964, the 1,538-square-kilometre (594 sq mi) municipality was the 41st largest by area out of the 689 municipalities in Norway. Nordli Municipality was the 585th most populous municipality in Norway with a population of about 1,180. The municipality's population density was 0.8 inhabitants per square kilometre (2.1/sq mi) and its population had increased by 11% over the previous 10-year period.

== General information ==
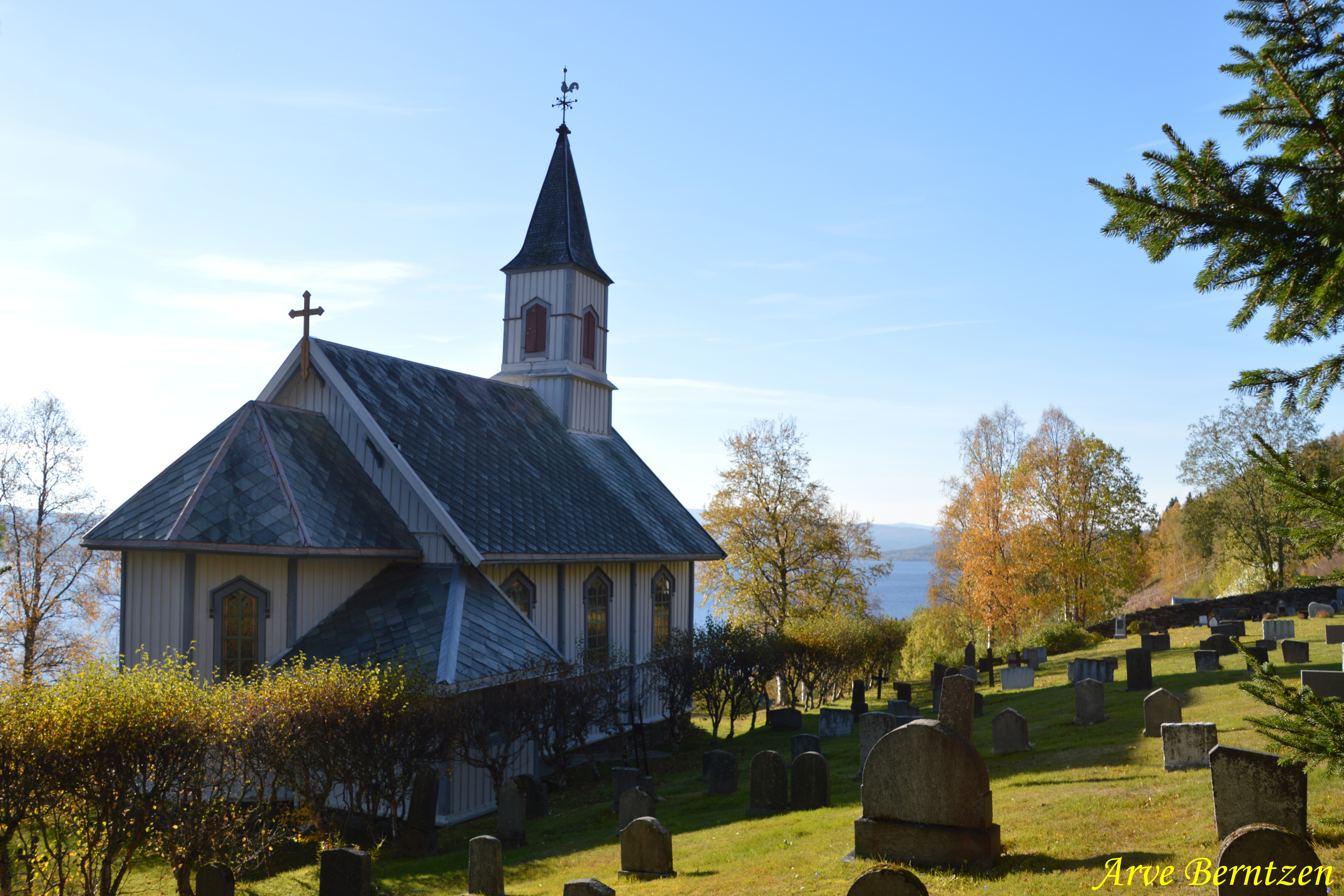
Nordli Church

The municipality of Nordli was established on 1 July 1915 when the old Lierne Municipality was split in two parts: Nordli Municipality (population: 863) in the north and Sørli Municipality (population: 739) in the south. The old Lierne Municipality had been created on 1 January 1874 when it was separated from the large Snåsa Municipality. During the 1960s, there were many municipal mergers across Norway due to the work of the Schei Committee. On 1 January 1964, the neighboring Sørli Municipality (population: 898) and Nordli Municipality (population: 1,147) were reunited to once again form Lierne Municipality.

=== Name ===
The municipal name is named after the old name for the region (Hlíð) which means "mountainside" (similar to the Norwegian word li). Historically, the prefix Finna- was often added to the name: Finnahlíð. This prefix is the plural genitive case of finnr which means "Sami person" (or Finn) because the district was historically populated by Sami people prior to the arrival of ethnic Norwegians. Later, the prefix was dropped and the definite plural form of li was used, Lierne. In 1915, the old municipality was divided into two parts: Nordli and Sørli. The names of these new municipalities came from the older name. The definite singular form of the name was used, li, and the prefix nord was added to show that this was the northern part of Li.

=== Churches ===
The Church of Norway had one parish (sokn) within Nordli Municipality. At the time of the municipal dissolution, it was part of the Lierne prestegjeld and the Indre Namdal prosti (deanery) in the Diocese of Nidaros.

Churches in Nordli Municipality
Parish (sokn)	Church name	Location of the church	Year built
Nordli	Nordli Church	Sandvika	1873
Nordli	Tunnsjø Chapel	Tunnsjø senter	1873

== Geography ==
The highest point in the municipality was the 1,390-metre (4,560 ft) tall mountain Hestkjøltoppen.

== Government ==
While it existed, Nordli Municipality was responsible for primary education (through 10th grade), outpatient health services, senior citizen services, welfare and other social services, zoning, economic development, and municipal roads and utilities. The municipality was governed by a municipal council of directly elected representatives. The mayor was indirectly elected by a vote of the municipal council. The municipality was under the jurisdiction of the Frostating Court of Appeal.

=== Municipal council ===
The municipal council (Herredsstyre) of Nordli Municipality was made up of 13 representatives that were elected to four year terms. The tables below show the historical composition of the council by political party.

Nordli herredsstyre 1959–1963
Party name (in Norwegian)	Number of representatives
Labour Party (Arbeiderpartiet)	5
Joint List(s) of Non-Socialist Parties (Borgerlige Felleslister)	8
Total number of members:	13
Note: On 1 January 1964, Nordli Municipality became part of Lierne Municipality.

Nordli herredsstyre 1955–1959
Party name (in Norwegian)	Number of representatives
Labour Party (Arbeiderpartiet)	5
Joint List(s) of Non-Socialist Parties (Borgerlige Felleslister)	8
Total number of members:	13

Nordli herredsstyre 1951–1955
Party name (in Norwegian)	Number of representatives
Labour Party (Arbeiderpartiet)	5
Joint List(s) of Non-Socialist Parties (Borgerlige Felleslister)	7
Total number of members:	12

Nordli herredsstyre 1947–1951
Party name (in Norwegian)	Number of representatives
Labour Party (Arbeiderpartiet)	5
Joint List(s) of Non-Socialist Parties (Borgerlige Felleslister)	7
Total number of members:	12

Nordli herredsstyre 1945–1947
Party name (in Norwegian)	Number of representatives
Labour Party (Arbeiderpartiet)	6
Joint List(s) of Non-Socialist Parties (Borgerlige Felleslister)	6
Total number of members:	12

Nordli herredsstyre 1937–1941*
Party name (in Norwegian)	Number of representatives
Labour Party (Arbeiderpartiet)	5
Local List(s) (Lokale lister)	7
Total number of members:	12
Note: Due to the German occupation of Norway during World War II, no elections were held for new municipal councils until after the war ended in 1945.

=== Mayors ===
The mayor (Norwegian: ordfører) of Nordli Municipality was the political leader of the municipality and the chairperson of the municipal council. Here is a list of people who held this position:

- 1915–1916: Jakob F. Holand
- 1917–1919: Johan Aagaard
- 1920–1922: Oluf Lerbak
- 1923–1925: Erik Larsen Harbækvold
- 1926–1928: Johan Aagård
- 1929–1941: Ole Aagård
- 1941–1945: Birger Nordback (NS)
- 1945–1947: Ole Aagård
- 1948–1951: Ragnar Harbækvold (Bp)
- 1952–1963: Ola H. Kveli (V)

== See also ==
- List of former municipalities of Norway
