= Sørli =

Sørli may refer to:

- Sørli (surname), a Norwegian surname

== Places ==
- Sørli Municipality, a former municipality in the old Nord-Trøndelag county, Norway
- Sørli Church, a church in Lierne Municipality in Trøndelag county, Norway
- Mebygda, a village (also known as Sørli) in Lierne Municipality in Trøndelag county, Norway
- Sørli tram stop, a light rail tram stop on the Oslo Tramway in Norway
