= Nordli (surname) =

Nordli is a Norwegian surname. Notable people with the surname include:

- Endre Nordli, Norwegian handball player
- Ernie Nordli (1912–1968), American animator
- Irene Nordli (born 1967), Norwegian artist
- Odvar Nordli (1927–2018), Norwegian politician
- Ramani Nordli (born 1999), Norwegian politician

== See also ==
- Nordlie
