= Stortissvatnet =

Lake in Trøndelag, Norway

Stortissvatnet (Norwegian) Vuallerenjaevrie (Southern Sami)
- Stor-Tisvatnet (Norwegian)
- Interactive map of the lake
- Location: Lierne Municipality, Trøndelag
- Coordinates: 64.3915°N 13.4632°E
- Basin countries: Norway
- Max. length: 5 kilometres (3.1 mi)
- Max. width: 1 kilometre (0.62 mi)
- Surface area: 4.63 km^{2} (1.79 sq mi)
- Shore length^{1}: 17.71 kilometres (11.00 mi)
- Surface elevation: 507 metres (1,663 ft)
- References: NVE
- ^{1} Shore length is not a well-defined measure.

Stortissvatnet (Norwegian) or Vuallerenjaevrie (Southern Sami) is a lake in Lierne Municipality in Trøndelag county, Norway. The lake lies south of the lake Laksjøen and north of the lake Holden.

== See also ==
- List of lakes in Norway
