= Lierne =

Lierne may refer to:

== Places ==
- Lierne Municipality, a municipality in Trøndelag county, Norway
- Lierne National Park, a national park in Trøndelag county, Norway

== Other ==
- Lierne (vault), architectural term for an element of a vault
- Lierne IL, a sports club from Lierne Municipality in Trøndelag county, Norway
