= Privileged transit traffic =

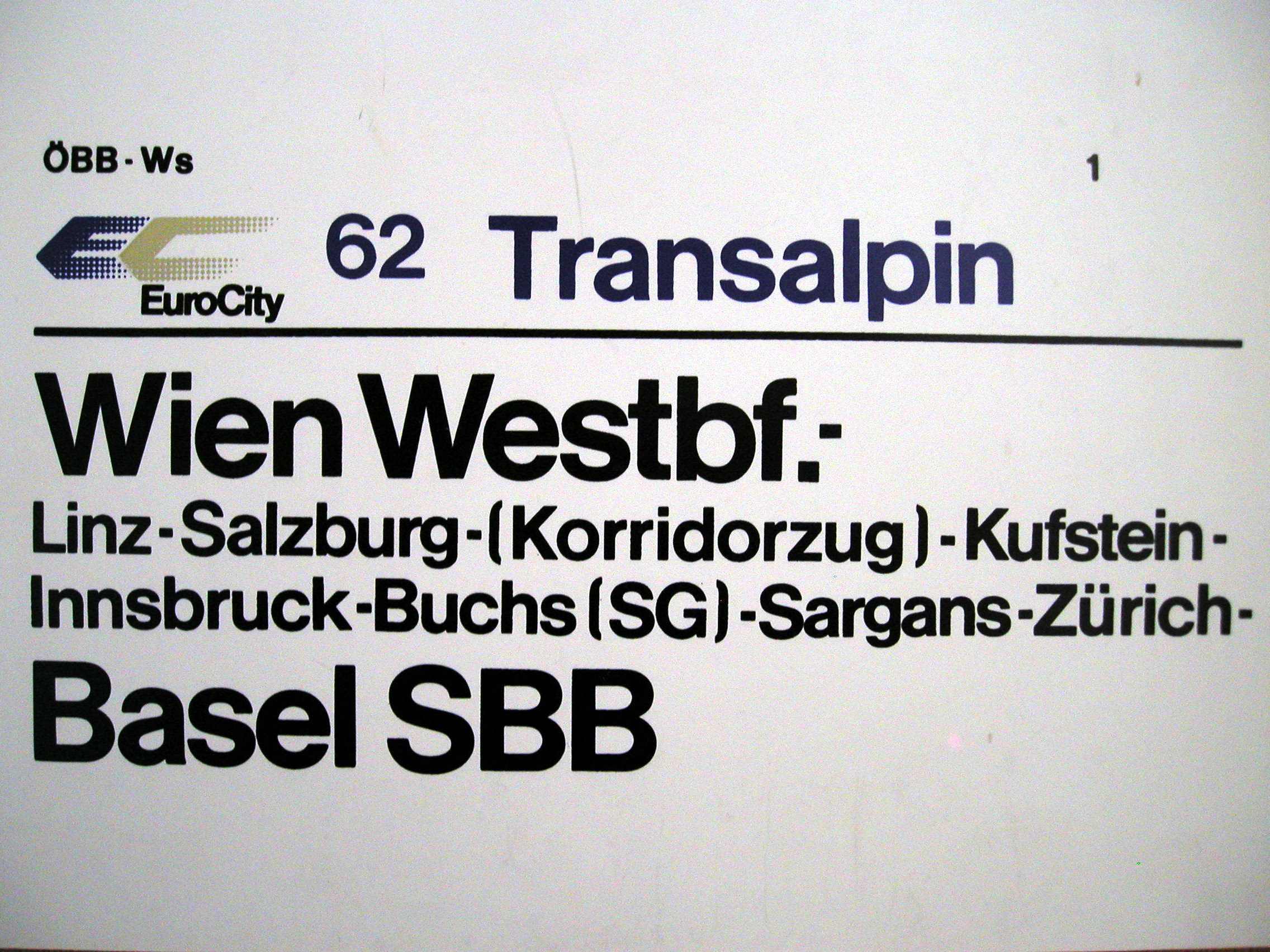
Destination sign on a Transalpin EuroCity train

Privileged transit traffic or corridor traffic is traffic of one country across the territory of another country without usual customs and passport checks. The corresponding line of communication (usually a railway) is called the (privileged) traffic corridor and a train used in this kind of transit is called a corridor train (German: Korridorzug, Italian: Treno-corridoio). The reason for such arrangements is usually border changes or border creation which cut through an existing transport corridor.

== Examples ==
Examples are listed with headlines for the country enjoying the transit privilege, not the country offering it.

=== Belgium ===
- The Vennbahn was a railway built in 1885, at the time fully in Germany. In 1919 some areas were transferred to Belgium. The railway did as a result cross the new border several times. To handle this, the railway embankment with tracks was also made Belgian territory if inside Germany, without having border controls at the road-rail crossings. The railway was dismantled in 2008, although the embankment still belongs to Belgium.

As a result six German exclaves surrounded by Belgian territory were created as well as one counter-enclave. Five enclaves remain today. The sixth enclave and the sole counter-enclave no longer exist.

=== Estonia ===
- Until 2026, the only road from Värska to Ulitina in Estonia passed through Russian territory for one kilometre (0.6 mi) of its length, an area called Saatse Boot. This road had no border control, making it a de facto part of the Schengen area, but there was no connection to any other road in Russia, and stopping or walking along the road was prohibited. This arrangement was in place from 1991 to 2025, when the road was closed and construction of a bypass within Estonian territory began.

=== Finland ===
- Finland leases the 19.6 km (12.2 mi)-long Russian part of the Saimaa Canal from Russia and is granted extraterritoriality rights. Russian visas are not required just to pass through the canal, but a passport is needed, and it is checked at the border.

=== Norway ===
- The small road between Sandvika and Tunnsjø senter in Trøndelag county in Norway goes through Sweden for 7 km. It is called road Z821 in Sweden and (nowadays) road 7012 in Norway on both sides of the border. It had the privilege of right-hand traffic also before 1967 when the rest of Sweden had left-hand traffic. Customs control are only occasional on this and many other small roads over the border.

=== Poland ===
- A 1931 agreement between Poland and Romania provided for railway traffic between parts of Poland across Romania, between Zaleszczyki and Jasienów Polny (now Yaseniv-Pil'nyi). Since 1945, both places have been in Ukraine.
- During the years between the world wars German trains could travel to and from East Prussia across the Polish Corridor with legally sealed doors, thereby relieving the passengers of the need to obtain Polish visas.

=== Russia and Kazakhstan ===
In the former Soviet Union, railways were built before the internal borders were made at present places, or not regarding them. Trains might go a stretch into another country and back. Some examples are:

- Railway connection between mainland Russia and its Kaliningrad Oblast exclave across Belarus and Lithuania (through Vilnius railway station). This was not privileged between 2007 and 2020 since normal passport and visa rules apply (since Lithuania entered the Schengen area in 2007).

Since the outbreak of the COVID-19 pandemic in 2020, the train has become privileged transit traffic again due to border closure by Lithuania, and now trains run non-stop through the territory of Lithuania. After the Russian invasion of Ukraine 2022, this traffic and any other border crossing trains between Lithuania and Russia or Belarus have stopped operating.

- Near Taraz, Kazakhstan, the railway Aktobe–Almaty passes briefly into Kyrgyzstan.
- Between Oral and Aktobe, Kazakhstan, the railway goes through Russia for over 100 km.
- Between Saratov and Astrakhan, Russia, the railway goes briefly through Kazakhstan twice.
- A branch of the Trans-Siberian Railway between Chelyabinsk and Omsk, Russia passes through the city Petropavl, Kazakhstan

=== Slovenia ===
- The road to the Brda region of Slovenia, between Solkan and Podsabotin settlements, crosses Italian territory. That stretch is 1,600 m (5,200 ft) long and surrounded by fence (45°58′58″N 13°37′43″E). Cars are not allowed to stop there and taking photos is not allowed either. The road was built in 1975, as part of the Treaty of Osimo agreements between Italy and Yugoslavia. The road remains surrounded by fence, even though both countries are now part of the Schengen Area.
- The railway from Grobelno through Rogatec (both in Slovenia) to Krapina and Zabok (both in Croatia) crosses the border to Croatia for short stretches which is trafficked like being inside Slovenia, until it passes the border to Croatia properly with border control (eliminated in 2023 when Croatia joined the Schengen Area). The railway goes along the Sutla river, whose old course forms the border. The river was straightened somewhat during the railway construction when this was internal land in Yugoslavia.

=== Serbia ===
- The Belgrade-Bar railway passes through Bosnia and Herzegovina between Priboj and Zlatibor, where there is a station at Štrpci

=== Germany ===
Büsingen am Hochrhein

- A historical case of privileged transit was the arrival of Vladimir Lenin in a "sealed train car" through Germany from Switzerland to Russia (through Sweden as a normal passenger) in April 1917, amidst World War I and Russian revolutionary activity.
- During World War II, Germans (including unarmed soldiers) were allowed to travel by train between Germany and German-occupied Norway, through neutral Sweden in sealed trains without border control, usually Kornsjø–Trelleborg.
- Communication between East Prussia and mainland Germany across the Polish Corridor during the interwar period (1920–1939).
- From 1948, it became possible to travel from Zittau to Görlitz through Poland via Deutsche Reichsbahn. The train has a station in Poland, Krzewina Zgorzelecka, located 100 metres from the border of the German city of Ostritz. Passengers could walk between the train and East Germany without border control under surveillance by Polish guards. This route is still in operation as of 2023, but since 2007 the inclusion of Poland in the Schengen area ended all passport checks at the German–Polish border.
- From 1949 to 1961, trains between East Berlin and parts of East Germany went through West Berlin because no other railways existed. It was easy to deboard the trains when they stopped in West Berlin. This was a major way of fleeing East Germany. Subsequently, the Berlin outer ring was built and when in operation from 1961 to 1990, West Berlin was sealed off and the Berlin Wall built.
- In the Cold War era from 1961 to 1990, Berlin U-Bahn and Berlin S-Bahn trains passed along sealed tunnels through East Berlin, without any checks or stops. The sealed stations were called ghost stations.
- Büsingen am Hochrhein is politically part of Germany but is surrounded by Switzerland and as such economically it forms part of the Swiss customs area, as does the independent principality of Liechtenstein. As such there have been no border controls between Switzerland and Büsingen am Hochrhein since 4 October 1967. Unofficially, the Italian village of Campione d'Italia was also part of the Swiss customs area until the end of 2019.

=== Austria ===
- Trains between Salzburg and Kufstein operated (via Germany) as privileged transit until 1997 when the Schengen area removed passport checks at this border. Border checks were reintroduced for them in 2015-2016 because of the European migrant crisis. The route has been called Deutsches Eck (German corner).
- After World War II a 'corridor-train' service was established between Lienz and Innsbruck using the Puster Valley Railway (via Italy); this service lost importance after the Schengen Agreement was implemented and was discontinued after 2013.
- From the end of the Second World War in 1945 to near the end of the Cold War in c. 1990, trains with locked doors (to prevent people from boarding or disembarking the train in then-Communist Hungary without permission) were allowed to go from Loipersbach-Schattendorf in northern Burgenland to Deutschkreutz in southern Burgenland via the Hungarian city of Sopron. The 44 minute train ride on a three-car diesel train crossed about 16 km of Hungarian territory up to five times a day traversing between Vienna and Deutschkreutz (previously Oberpullendorf). Nowadays, after the fall of Communism in Hungary and the accession of Hungary to the European Union, trains from Vienna call at Sopron before continuing on to Deutschkreutz. Austrian fares apply for the whole line.

=== Czech Republic ===
- After World War II, in 1945, a 2.7 km (1.7 mi) section of the railway line Varnsdorf (CS) – Zittau (DE) – Liberec (CS) through Porajów became part of Poland, and international traffic was stopped. In 1951, the Czechoslovak Railways restored the Varnsdorf – Liberec connection based on an agreement with East Germany (GDR) and Poland; ČSD trains had no stop in Polish or German territory. In 1964, a new treatment was signed. From 1972, GDR and Czechoslovakia restored standard international transport on this line. After the expansion of the Schengen area, Varnsdorf – Liberec trains also stop in Germany, but traffic through the Polish section is still based on the transit agreement. The Polish side gets a charge from the Czech side but neglects the Polish section and refuses proposals of Czech or German participation in the maintenance.

=== Switzerland ===
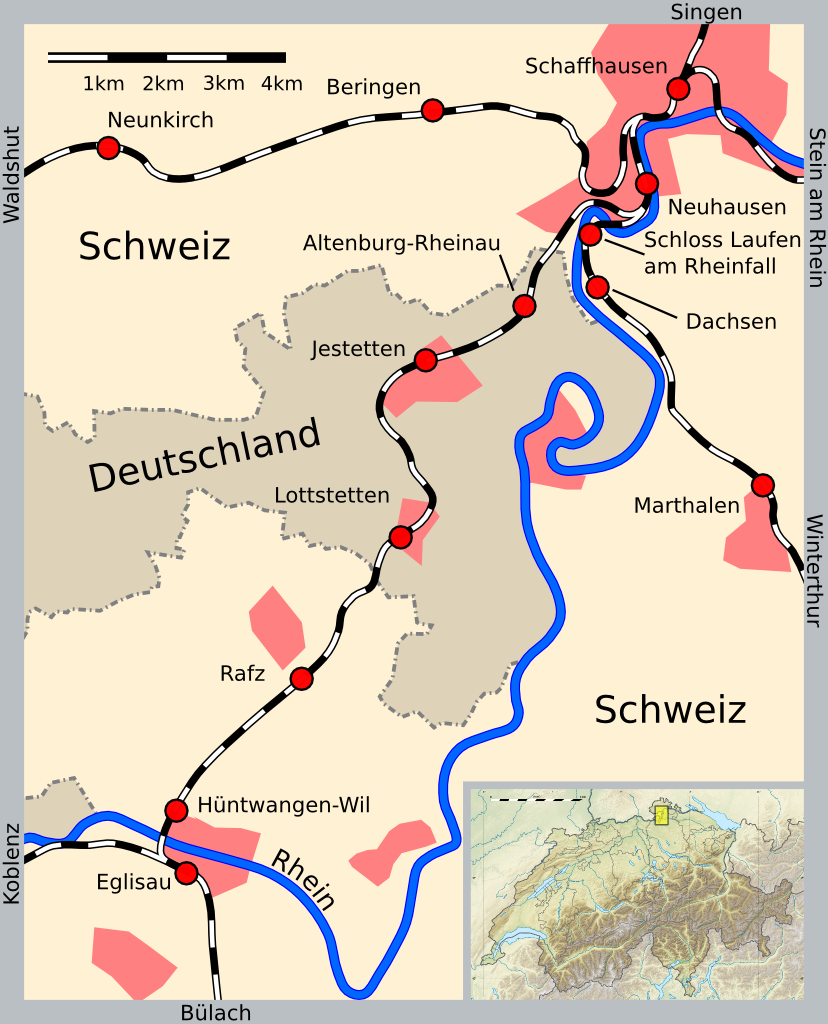
The Eglisau–Neuhausen railway line

- Basel tram Line 10 (BLT) operates from Switzerland to Switzerland, passing via Leymen in France. Transit passengers are not subject to customs rules and checks, but those boarding or alighting in Leymen are subject to customs regulations.
- The Eglisau–Neuhausen railway line is a cross-border railway line in Germany and Switzerland. The line links Eglisau in the Swiss canton of Zurich with the city of Schaffhausen in the Swiss canton of Schaffhausen, crossing some 8 kilometres (5.0 mi) of the German state of Baden-Württemberg in between. It thus crosses the Germany–Switzerland border twice. Trains which pass through German territory without stopping at any of the stations on the line in Germany, are not subject to any customs formalities or restrictions of either country, despite the train and its passengers technically leaving the Swiss Customs Area, entering the European Union customs area and entering Swiss customs territory again. An agreement in this respect was entered into by the two countries and became law in 1936.
- The Lake Line is a railway line mostly in Switzerland, but with a station in Konstanz, Germany, which has a Swiss platform.
- The High Rhine Railway crosses the Swiss-German border several times.
- The Basel Badischer station is located in Switzerland, but operated by German Railways, and with border control done in the building. It was possible to travel from e.g. Freiburg on the Rhine Valley Railway to e.g. Rheinfelden on the High Rhine Railway or to Lörrach on the Wiese Valley Railway with a train change at Basel Badischer without border and customs control. After Swiss introduction into the Schengen Area, border controls are abolished but customs rules still apply.
- A 1.7 km customs road links Ferney-Voltaire with the French section of Geneva Airport, which is located entirely within Swiss territory.
- A 2.5 km customs road links Basel with the Swiss section of EuroAirport, which is located entirely within French territory.

=== The Netherlands ===
- Provincial road N274 is a Dutch main road that runs from Roermond to Brunssum, crossing in and out of Germany for about 7 km through the German municipality Selfkant. The road was built in a time when some German municipalities (including Selfkant) were under Dutch control after World War II. Until 2002 the German section was maintained by the Dutch Rijkswaterstaat, the road had no level intersections, and it was not possible to leave or join the road from German territory. On February 25, 2002, the corridor was handed over to Germany, giving it the name Landesstraße 410 (L410). The road was further integrated into the German network, making it possible to leave to and join from German territory. In contrast to other German roads, freight trucks are allowed to drive here on Sundays and national holidays, while in the rest of Germany this is prohibited.

== Air traffic ==
Air traffic has in general a number of privileged transit traffic rights, making it suitable to reach enclaves or isolated countries, and for longer-distance flights.

- First freedom of the air: The right to fly over another country.
- Second freedom of the air: The right to make technical stops (such as refuelling) in another country without customs and passport check.
- Airside transit: The right for passengers to change aircraft at airports, without going through passport control.

Most but not all countries offer these privileges.

== See also ==
- Enclave and exclave#Unusual cross-border transport channels
