= Ingelsvatnet =

Lake in Trøndelag, Norway

- Interactive map of the lake
- Location: Lierne Municipality, Trøndelag
- Coordinates: 64.6664°N 13.4254°E
- Type: natural freshwater lake
- Basin countries: Norway
- Max. length: 5 kilometres (3.1 mi)
- Max. width: 2 kilometres (1.2 mi)
- Surface area: 7.16 km^{2} (2.76 sq mi)
- Shore length^{1}: 18.22 kilometres (11.32 mi)
- Surface elevation: 460 metres (1,510 ft)
- Islands: several islands and islets
- References: NVE
- ^{1} Shore length is not a well-defined measure.

Ingelsvatnet is a lake in Lierne Municipality in Trøndelag county, Norway. The 7.16-square-kilometre (2.76 sq mi) lake lies only 1.5 kilometres (0.93 mi) from the south shore of the large lake Tunnsjøen and 10 kilometres (6.2 mi) west of the village of Tunnsjø senter. The water flows out through a series of small lakes and streams that lead into Tunnsjøen. The lake Havdalsvatnet lies 4 kilometres (2.5 mi) south of Ingelsvatnet.

== See also ==
- List of lakes in Norway
