= Holand, Trøndelag =

Village in Lierne Municipality, Norway

Holand
- Village
- Interactive map of Holand
- Location within Trøndelag Location within Norway
- Coordinates: 64.4449°N 13.7161°E
- Country: Norway
- Region: Central Norway
- County: Trøndelag
- District: Namdalen
- Municipality: Lierne Municipality
- Elevation: 418 m (1,371 ft)
- Time zone: UTC+01:00 (CET)
  - Summer (DST): UTC+02:00 (CEST)
- Post Code: 7882 Nordli

Holand is a village located on the northern shore of the lake Sandsjøen in the northern part of Lierne Municipality in Trøndelag county, Norway. It lies about 8 kilometres (5.0 mi) east of the village of Sandvika, the administrative center of Lierne Municipality, and it is about 15 kilometres (9.3 mi) southwest of the border with Sweden.

== Climate ==
Climate data for Nordli - Holand 1991-2019 (433 m)
Month	Jan	Feb	Mar	Apr	May	Jun	Jul	Aug	Sep	Oct	Nov	Dec	Year
Mean daily maximum °C (°F)	−3.1 (26.4)	−3.3 (26.1)	0 (32)	4.8 (40.6)	10.2 (50.4)	14.7 (58.5)	18.1 (64.6)	16.6 (61.9)	11.5 (52.7)	5 (41)	0.5 (32.9)	−2 (28)	6.1 (42.9)
Daily mean °C (°F)	−6.5 (20.3)	−6.8 (19.8)	−3.9 (25.0)	0.7 (33.3)	5.6 (42.1)	10.2 (50.4)	13.2 (55.8)	12.2 (54.0)	7.8 (46.0)	2.3 (36.1)	−2 (28)	−4.7 (23.5)	2.3 (36.2)
Mean daily minimum °C (°F)	−10.2 (13.6)	−10.3 (13.5)	−8 (18)	−3.2 (26.2)	1.4 (34.5)	5.9 (42.6)	9.1 (48.4)	8.3 (46.9)	4.9 (40.8)	0.2 (32.4)	−4.3 (24.3)	−8.1 (17.4)	−1.2 (29.9)
Average precipitation mm (inches)	73.5 (2.89)	68 (2.7)	67.9 (2.67)	43.9 (1.73)	41.1 (1.62)	71.9 (2.83)	87.3 (3.44)	73.9 (2.91)	77.1 (3.04)	72.9 (2.87)	65.5 (2.58)	83.3 (3.28)	826.3 (32.56)
Average precipitation days	16	15	14	10	11	13	14	14	14	15	15	18	169
Source: NOAA
