= Kingen =

Lake on the border between Sweden and Norway

- Interactive map of the lake
- Location: Lierne (Trøndelag), Krokom (Jämtland)
- Coordinates: 64.0269°N 13.9749°E
- Basin countries: Norway, Sweden
- Max. length: 4 kilometres (2.5 mi)
- Max. width: 2 kilometres (1.2 mi)
- Surface area: 5.1 km^{2} (2.0 sq mi)
- Shore length^{1}: 16.1 kilometres (10.0 mi)
- Surface elevation: 374 metres (1,227 ft)
- References: NVE
- ^{1} Shore length is not a well-defined measure.

Kingen is a lake on the border between Sweden and Norway. The Norwegian part (2.25 square kilometres or 0.87 square miles) is located in Lierne Municipality in Trøndelag county, and the Swedish part (2.85 square kilometres or 1.10 square miles) is located in Krokom Municipality in Jämtland County. It lies south of the larger lake Rengen.

== See also ==
- List of lakes in Norway
