= Ulen (lake) =

Lake in Trøndelag, Norway

- Interactive map of the lake
- Location: Lierne Municipality, Trøndelag
- Coordinates: 64.1590°N 13.8539°E
- Basin countries: Norway
- Max. length: 4.5 kilometres (2.8 mi)
- Max. width: 2 kilometres (1.2 mi)
- Surface area: 6.23 km^{2} (2.41 sq mi)
- Shore length^{1}: 14.85 kilometres (9.23 mi)
- Surface elevation: 346 metres (1,135 ft)
- References: NVE
- ^{1} Shore length is not a well-defined measure.

Ulen is a lake in Lierne Municipality in Trøndelag county, Norway. The 6.23-square-kilometre (2.41 sq mi) lake lies south of the village of Mebygda. Water flows south from the lake Lenglingen into Ulen, and it then continues south into the lake Rengen (which goes into Sweden).

== See also ==
- List of lakes in Norway
