= Sandsjøen =

Lake in Lierne, Trøndelag, Norway

- Interactive map of the lake
- Location: Lierne Municipality, Trøndelag
- Coordinates: 64.4344°N 13.6831°E
- Basin countries: Norway
- Max. length: 8 kilometres (5.0 mi)
- Max. width: 3 kilometres (1.9 mi)
- Surface area: 15.1 km^{2} (5.8 sq mi)
- Shore length^{1}: 27.1 kilometres (16.8 mi)
- Surface elevation: 409 metres (1,342 ft)
- References: NVE
- ^{1} Shore length is not a well-defined measure.

Sandsjøen is a lake in Lierne Municipality in Trøndelag county, Norway. It lies about 4 kilometres (2.5 mi) southeast of the municipal center, Sandvika. The village of Holand is located on the northern shore of Sandsjøen.

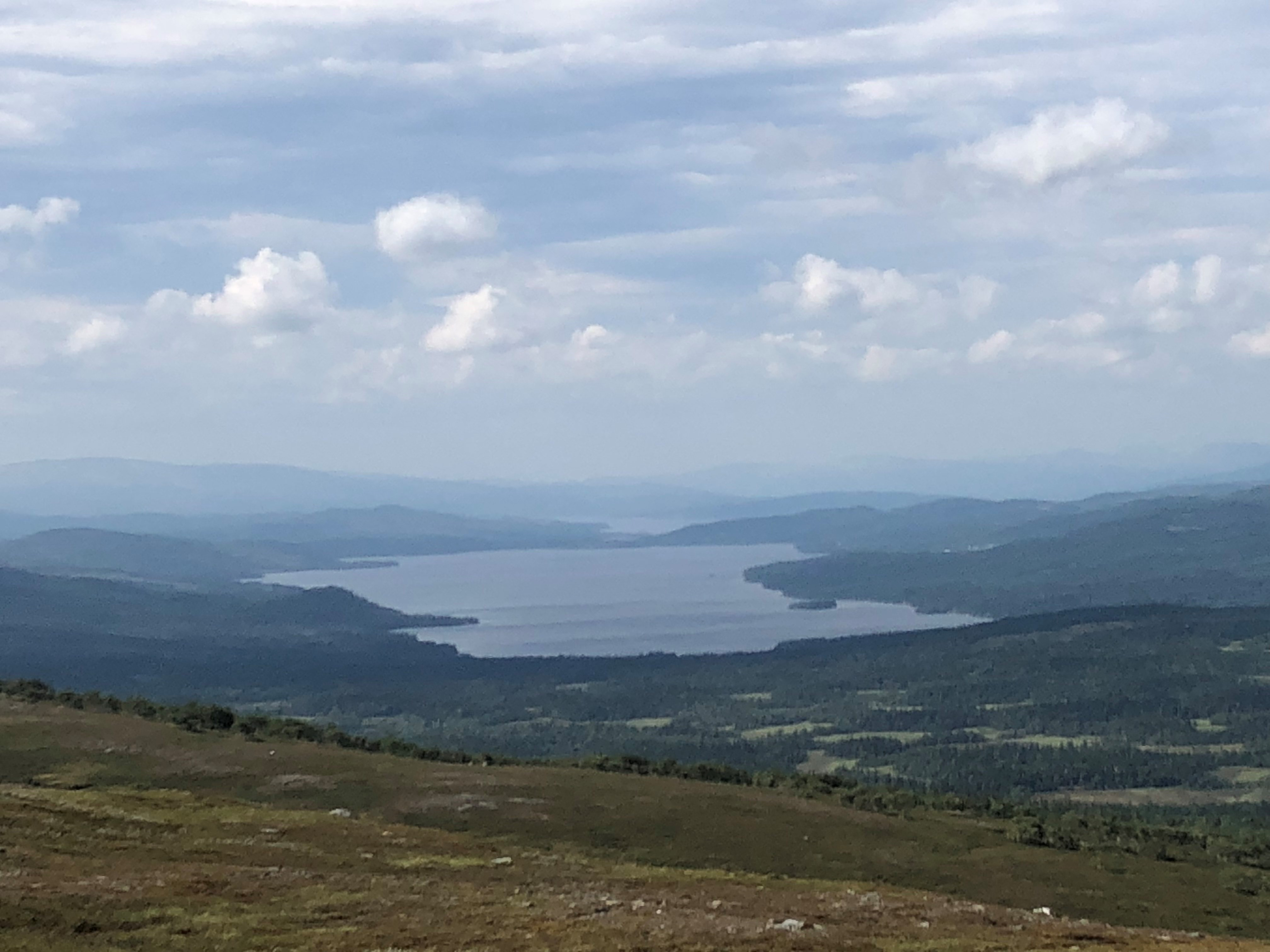
Lake Sandsjøen in Lierne

The lake, near the Swedish border, is the beginning of the Sanddøla river, a main tributary of the river Namsen. The lake flows out into the lake Laksjøen to the west.

== See also ==
- List of lakes in Norway
