= Flyktningerennet =

Cross country ski race

- Status: active
- Genre: sports event
- Date: circa April
- Frequency: annual
- Country: Norway, Sweden
- Inaugurated: 1950

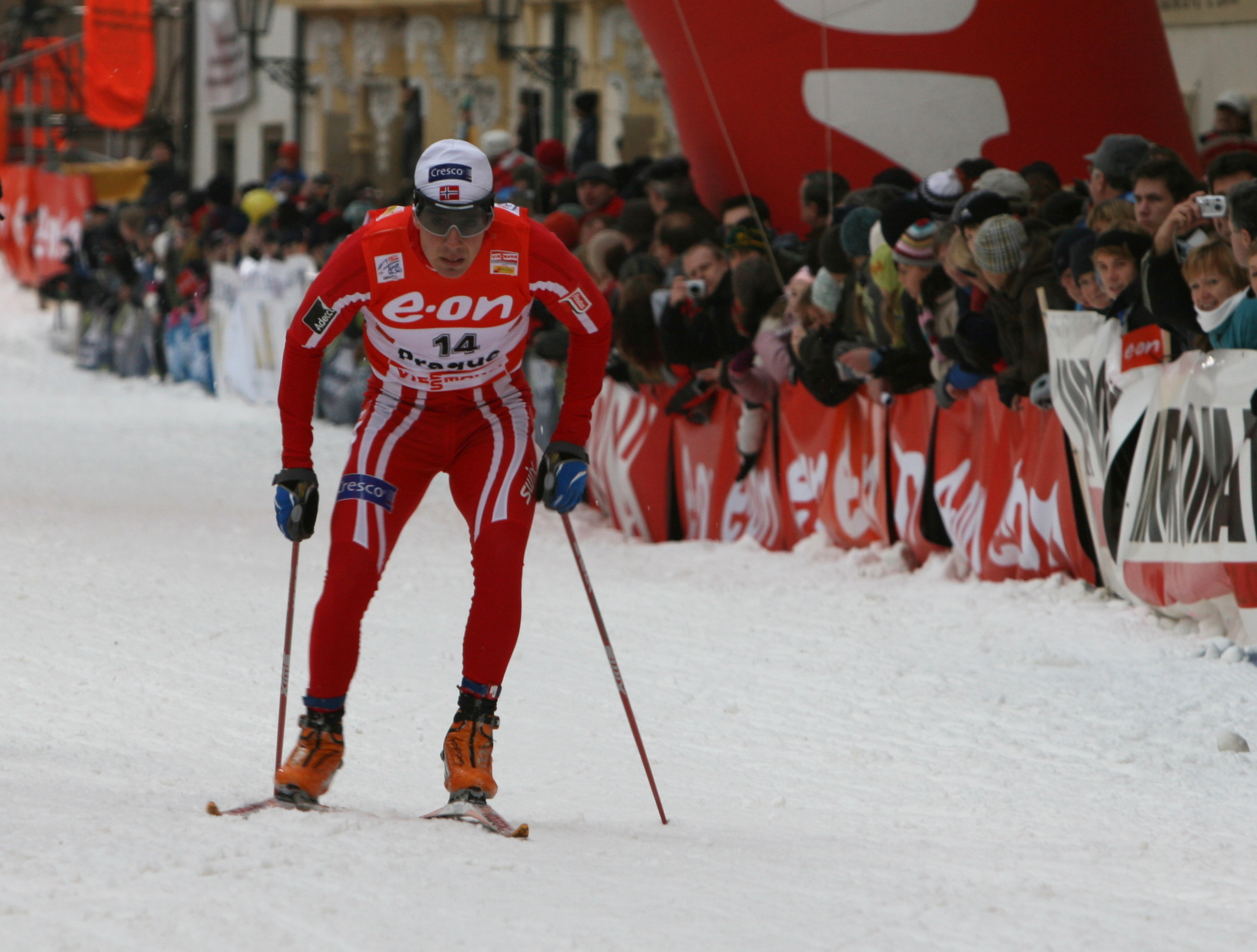

Flyktningerennet is a cross country ski race, running from Lierne, Norway to Gäddede, Sweden. The ski race follows this route in remembrance of the people who fled Nazi German-occupied Norway for Sweden during the Second World War.

The first race was arranged in 1950, with H. Hemmingsson as winner. The first female Flyktningerenn was arranged in 1964.

== Winner Men 1950–2014 ==
- 1950 H. Hemmingsson
- 1951 N. Eriksson
- 1952 M. Estenstad
- 1953 Sigvard Jonsson
- 1954 Sigvard Jonsson
- 1955 M. Ingebrigtsli
- 1956 Sigvard Jonsson
- 1957 Sigvard Jonsson
- 1958 Sverre Stensheim
- 1959 Sverre Stensheim
- 1960 Janne Stefansson
- 1961 Magnar Lundemo
- 1962 T. Matsuhasi, Japan
- 1963 Sverre Stensheim
- 1964 Melker Risberg
- 1965 I. Skjemstad
- 1966 Melker Risberg
- 1967 Melker Risberg
- 1968 Melker Risberg
- 1969 Pål Tyldum
- 1970 Pål Tyldum
- 1971 Pål Tyldum
- 1972 Janne Halvarsson
- 1973 Sven Åke Lundbäck
- 1974 Janne Halvarsson
- 1975 Pål Tyldum
- 1976 Pål Tyldum
- 1977 Oddvar Brå and Magne Myrmo
- 1978 Ove Aunli
- 1979 Oddvar Brå
- 1980 Oddvar Brå
- 1981 Tomas Wassberg
- 1983 Ove Aunli
- 1984 Lars Göran Dahl
- 1985 Ove Aunli
- 1986 Terje Langli
- 1987 Sture Sivertsen
- 1988 Ola Berget
- 1989 Oddvar Brå
- 1990 Gunde Svan
- 1991 Terje Langli
- 1992 Sture Sivertsen
- 1993 Aleksej Prokurorov
- 1994 Sture Sivertsen
- 1995 Terje Langli
- 1996 Erling Jevne
- 1997 Erling Jevne
- 1998 Frode Estil
- 1999 Frode Estil
- 2000 Erling Jevne
- 2001 Erling Jevne
- 2002 Frode Estil
- 2003 Anders Södergren
- 2004 Anders Södergren
- 2005 Frode Estil
- 2006 Frode Estil
- 2007 Oskar Svärd
- 2008 Petter Northug
- 2009 Anders Högberg
- 2010 Petter Northug
- 2011 Eldar Rønning
- 2012 Niklas Dyrhaug
- 2013 John Kristian Dahl
- 2014 Niklas Dyrhaug

== Winner Women 1964–2014 ==
- 1964 Britt Strandberg
- 1965 Britt Strandberg
- 1966 B. Martinsson
- 1967 Britt Strandberg
- 1968 Babben Enger
- 1969 Berit Mørdre
- 1970 Inger Aufles
- 1971 Berit Mørdre
- 1972 Berit Mørdre
- 1973 Berit Mørdre
- 1974 Lilian Olsson
- 1975 Inger Aufles
- 1976 Meeri Bodeli
- 1977 Vigdis Rønning
- 1978 Vigdis Rønning
- 1979 Marit Myrmæl
- 1980 Vigdis Rønning
- 1981 Vigdis Rønning
- 1983 Vigdis Rønning
- 1984 Vigdis Rønning
- 1985 Berit Aunli
- 1986 Gunn Finne
- 1987 Inger Lise Hegge
- 1988 Unni Hovdal
- 1989 Unni Hovdal
- 1990 Inger Lise Hegge
- 1991 Inger Lise Hegge
- 1992 Beate Brevik
- 1993 Line Selsnes (15 km)
- 1994 Kristin Kjevbu (15 km)
- 1995 Marit Storeng (15 km)
- 1996 Marit Mikkelsplass
- 1997 Trude Dybendal Hartz
- 1998 Antonina Ordina
- 1999 Bente Martinsen
- 2000 Inger Lise Hegge
- 2001 Elin Nilsen
- 2002 Kine Beate Bjørnås
- 2003 Marit Bjørgen
- 2004 Kristin Mürer Stemland
- 2005 Susanne Nyström
- 2006 Kine Beate Bjørnås
- 2007 Marte Elden
- 2008 Ragnhild Hoel
- 2009 Ida Olsson
- 2010 Karianne Gåsland Bjellånes
- 2011 Marte Elden
- 2012 Sara Svendsen
- 2013 Astrid Øyre Slind
- 2014 Heidi Weng
