= Lierne National Park =

National park in Lierne, Norway

- IUCN category II (national park)
- Interactive map of Lierne National Park
- Location: Trøndelag, Norway
- Nearest city: Grong
- Coordinates: 64°18′N 13°54′E
- Area: 333 square kilometres (129 sq mi)
- Established: 2004
- Governing body: Directorate for Nature Management

Lierne National Park (Norwegian: Lierne nasjonalpark) lies in Lierne Municipality in Trøndelag county, Norway. The 333-square-kilometre (129 sq mi) park was established on 17 December 2004 by a royal resolution. The park covers 333 square kilometres (129 sq mi) of land along the border with Sweden. The park lies east of the populated areas in Lierne Municipality, about 12 kilometres (7.5 mi) southeast of the village of Sandvika and about 6 kilometres (3.7 mi) northeast of the village of Mebygda.

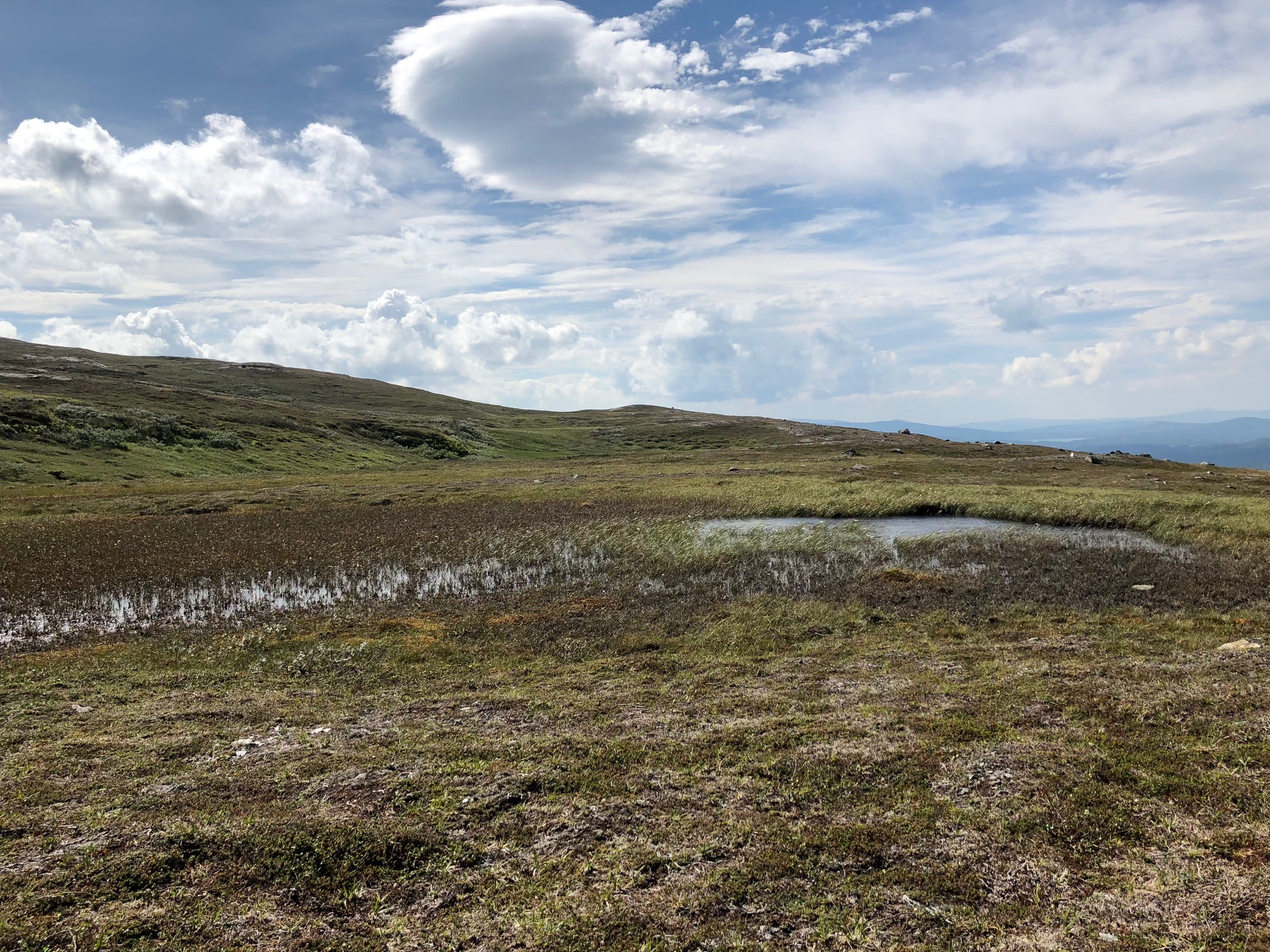
A plateau at 790 metres (2,590 ft) above sea level

The park is dominated by a large mountainous region rich in lynx, wolverines, bears, and wildfowl. The rare Arctic fox also lives in the area. Much of the land was formed during the last ice age. There are many peaks over 1,000 metres (3,300 ft) above sea level, the highest of which is Hestkjøltopp at 1,390 metres (4,560 ft). There are many wetland areas with large swamps and open woodlands.
