= Corridor train =

Corridor train may refer to:

- Privileged transit traffic
- Corridor (Via Rail), Quebec City-Windsor Corridor, Canada
- Amtrak trains of the Northeast Corridor, USA
- Amtrak's Capitol Corridor service in Northern California, USA
- A train with corridor connection
