= Holden (Lierne) =

Lake in Lierne, Norway

- Interactive map of the lake
- Location: Lierne Municipality, Trøndelag
- Coordinates: 64.3372°N 13.5385°E
- Primary inflows: Fossdalselva river
- Primary outflows: Holdelva river
- Basin countries: Norway
- Max. length: 4.5 kilometres (2.8 mi)
- Max. width: 1 kilometre (0.62 mi)
- Surface area: 3.61 km^{2} (1.39 sq mi)
- Shore length^{1}: 11.45 kilometres (7.11 mi)
- Surface elevation: 403 metres (1,322 ft)
- References: NVE
- ^{1} Shore length is not a well-defined measure.

Holden is a lake in Lierne Municipality in Trøndelag county, Norway. The 3.61-square-kilometre (1.39 sq mi) lake lies north of the lakes Lenglingen and Gusvatnet. The municipal center, Sandvika, is located about 20 kilometres (12 mi) to the north of the lake.

== See also ==
- List of lakes in Norway
