= Ola H. Kveli =

Norwegian politician

Ola Hansen Kveli (23 April 1921 – 22 April 2003) was a Norwegian politician for the Liberal Party and later the Liberal People's Party.

He was elected to the Norwegian Parliament from Nord-Trøndelag in 1969. During his second term, in December 1972, Kveli joined the Liberal People's Party which split from the Liberal Party over disagreements of Norway's proposed entry to the European Economic Community. Like most of the Liberal People's Party representatives, he was not re-elected in 1973.

He had previously served in the position of deputy representative during the terms 1961–1965 and 1965–1969. During both these terms he served as a regular representative meanwhile Bjarne Lyngstad was appointed to the cabinet Lyng (1963) and cabinet Borten (from 1965).

Kveli was born in Nordli Municipality. He was part of the municipal council of Nordli Municipality as well as mayor from 1951 to 1963, and of its successor Lierne Municipality in 1963–1965. His political career ended with the post of County Governor of Nord-Trøndelag, which he held from 1979 to 1991.

Kveli is also a former leader of Det Norske Totalavholdsselskap, Norway's oldest temperance organization.

Civic offices
Preceded by Leif Granli	County Governor of Nord-Trøndelag; 1979–1991	Succeeded by Oddbjørn Nordset (acting)
