= Kvesjøen =

Lake in Lierne, Norway

- Interactive map of the lake
- Location: Lierne Municipality, Trøndelag
- Coordinates: 64.4956°N 13.8138°E
- Basin countries: Norway
- Max. length: 10.5 kilometres (6.5 mi)
- Max. width: 3.5 kilometres (2.2 mi)
- Surface area: 19.1 km^{2} (7.4 sq mi)
- Shore length^{1}: 33.5 kilometres (20.8 mi)
- Surface elevation: 320 metres (1,050 ft)
- References: NVE
- ^{1} Shore length is not a well-defined measure.

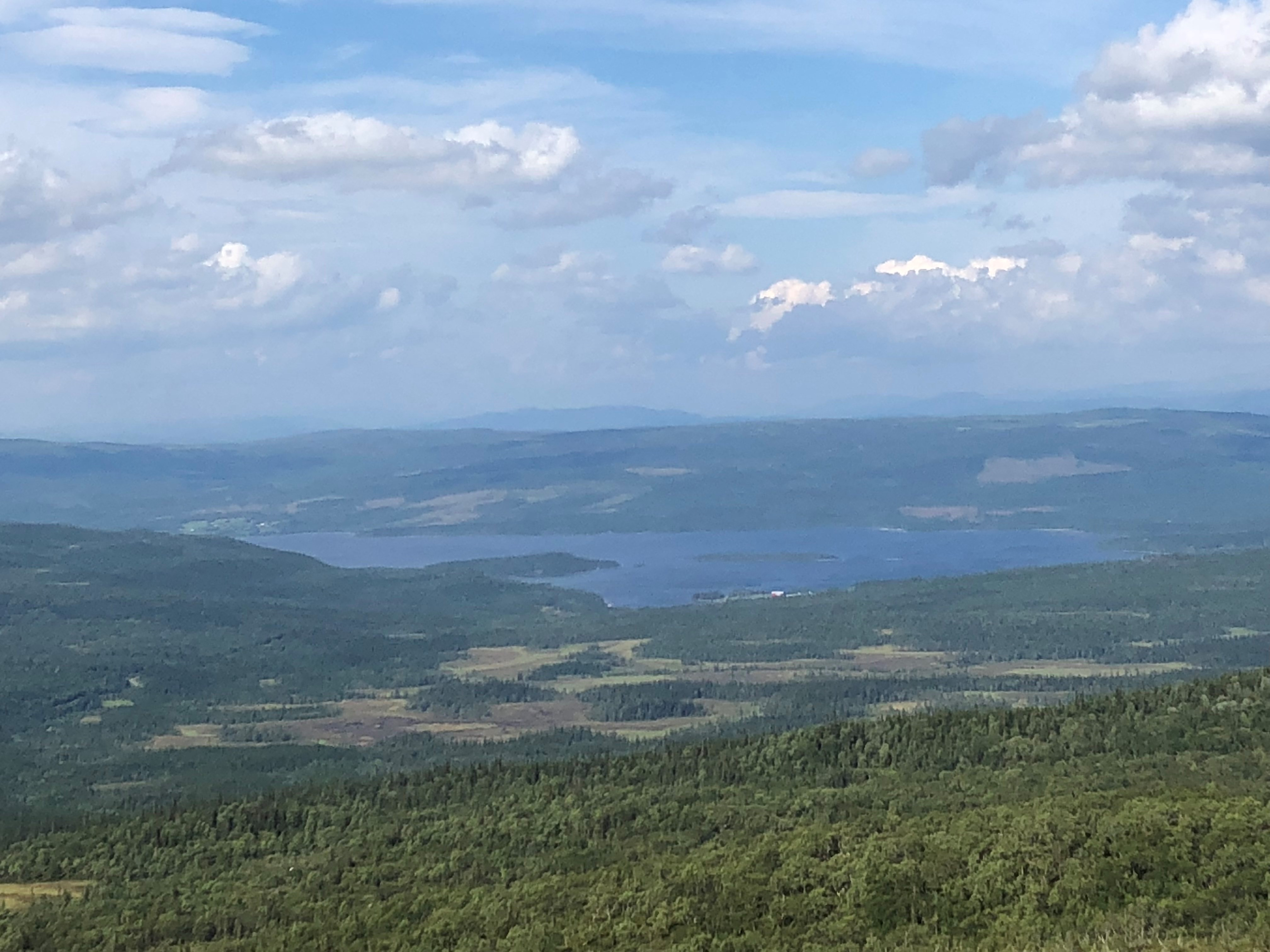
Lake Kvesjøen in Lierne, Trøndelag, Norway seen from south at 790 masl in Lierne National Park (Hestkjølen).

Kvesjøen is a lake in Lierne Municipality in Trøndelag county, Norway. The lake lies just inside the Norwegian border with Sweden, on the west end of the lake Murusjøen. The 19.09-square-kilometre (7.37 sq mi) lake sits 320 metres (1,050 ft) above sea level. The lake contains at least six different fish species; Arctic char, burbot, two different species of trout, grayling and pike.

== See also ==
- List of lakes in Norway
