= Sørli (surname) =

Sørli is a Norwegian surname. Notable people with the surname include:

- Kristian Sørli, a retired Norwegian footballer
- Odd Sørli, a retired Danish-born Norwegian alpine skier
- Ole A. Sørli, a Norwegian musician and writer
- Sondre Sørli, a Norwegian professional footballer

== See also ==
- Sørli (disambiguation)
