= Lenglingen =

Lake in Trøndelag, Norway

- Interactive map of the lake
- Location: Lierne Municipality, Trøndelag
- Coordinates: 64.2471°N 13.7076°E
- Basin countries: Norway
- Max. length: 14 kilometres (8.7 mi)
- Max. width: 2.4 kilometres (1.5 mi)
- Surface area: 16.9 km^{2} (6.5 sq mi)
- Shore length^{1}: 40.8 kilometres (25.4 mi)
- Surface elevation: 354 metres (1,161 ft)
- References: NVE
- ^{1} Shore length is not a well-defined measure.

Lenglingen is a lake in Lierne Municipality in Trøndelag county, Norway. The 16.9-square-kilometre (6.5 sq mi) lake is fed by the lakes Holden and Gusvatnet, and the water from Lenglingen flows south into the lake Ulen. The village of Mebygda lies on the southeastern shore of the lake.
