= Deutsches Eck (transport link) =

Road and railway link between Salzburg and the Tyrolean Unterland, Austria

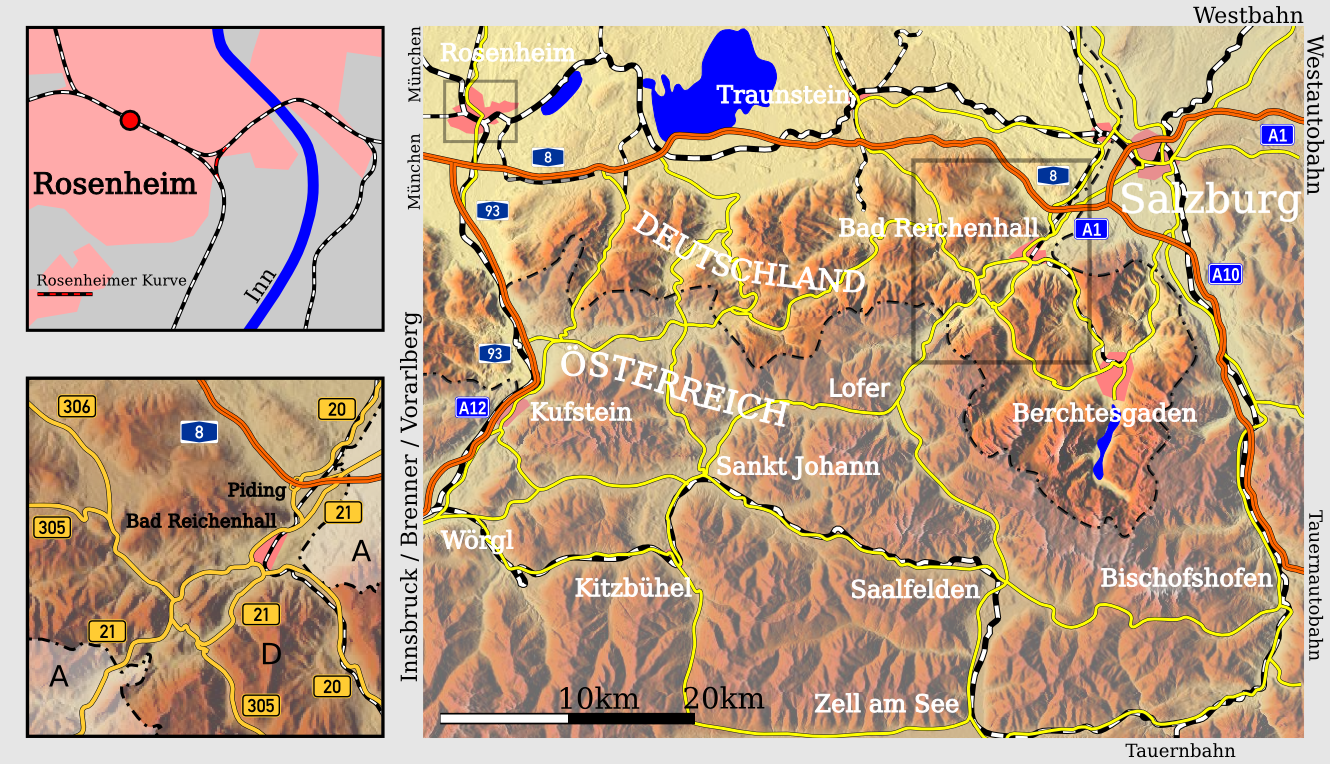
Overview of the most important transport routes in the region (large map), "Kleines Deutsches Eck" (l. below), Rosenheimer Kurve (l. above)

The Deutsches Eck ("German Corner") is the name given to the shortest and most convenient road and railway link between the Austrian metropolitan region of Salzburg and the Tyrolean Unterland with the state capital Innsbruck.

Due to the mountainous landscape and the irregular course of the border, the main transport routes to the western Austrian states of Tyrol and Vorarlberg pass through the territory of the German state of Bavaria. While an alternative, albeit longer, all-Austrian Salzburg-Tyrol Railway exists, there is no continuous, intra-Austrian motorway route between the states of Salzburg and Tyrol.

== Großes Deutsches Eck ==
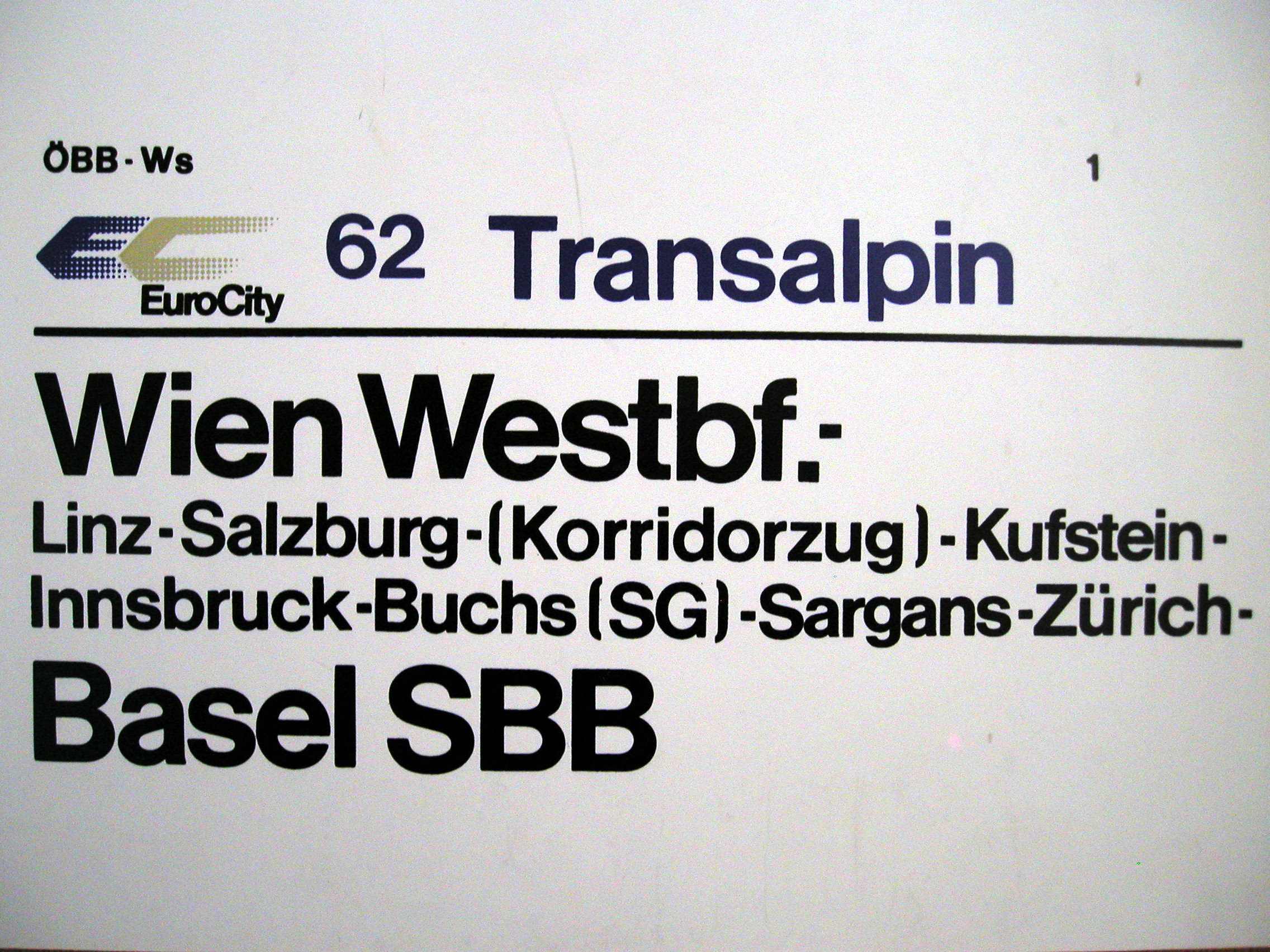
Train destination sign of the ÖBB Transalpin EuroCity (1958-2010) from Vienna Westbahnhof to Basel SBB. Between Salzburg and Kufstein, the train runs as a Korridorzug, 'corridor train'.

A larger railway and autobahn (motorway) link runs from Salzburg westwards along the northern rim of the Chiemgau Alps to the Bavarian town of Rosenheim, then turns south through the Inn valley to reach the Tyrolean border at Kufstein.

Since the conclusion of an 1851 treaty between the Austrian Empire and the Kingdom of Bavaria, so-called "corridor trains" of the Austrian Railways (ÖBB) use the Rosenheim–Salzburg and Rosenheim–Kufstein railway lines maintained by the German Deutsche Bahn company against payment of a regular fee. At the Rosenheim rail junction a direct connection (the Rosenheimer Kurve) was erected in 1982 to allow express trains to pass quickly without a stop at Rosenheim station.

The parallel German Bundesautobahn 8 links the Austrian West Autobahn at Salzburg with the Inntal three-way interchange near Rosenheim, from where the southern Bundesautobahn 93 leads to the border crossing at Kufstein and the Tyrolean Inn Valley Autobahn. The road connection to Tyrol on Austrian highways via Bischofshofen and Zell am See or Saalfelden is considerably longer.

== Kleines Deutsches Eck ==
A smaller highway connection leads from the southwestern outskirts of Salzburg at Wals-Siezenheim over the border on the German Bundesstraße 21 along the Saalach river via Bad Reichenhall to Unken and Lofer in the Austrian Pinzgau region. As in Austria, studded winter tyres are admitted (while prohibited in the rest of Germany) to avoid drivers having to change tyres.

Since Austria joined the Schengen Area in 1997, all border controls have been abolished, allowing travellers to move freely between both countries.
