= Sørli Municipality =

Former municipality in Trøndelag, Norway

Sørli Municipality Sørli herred
- Former municipality
- Nord-Trøndelag within Norway

- Sørli within Nord-Trøndelag
- Coordinates: 64.2246°N 13.8308°E
- Country: Norway
- County: Nord-Trøndelag
- District: Namdalen
- Established: 1 July 1915
  - Preceded by: Lierne Municipality
- Disestablished: 1 Jan 1964
  - Succeeded by: Lierne Municipality
- Administrative centre: Mebygda

Government
  - Mayor (1956–1963): Ole Strand (V)

Area (upon dissolution)
  - Total: 1,431.4 km^{2} (552.7 sq mi)
  - Rank: #51 in Norway
- Highest elevation: 1,390 m (4,560 ft)

Population (1963)
  - Total: 908
  - Rank: #625 in Norway
  - Density: 0.6/km^{2} (1.6/sq mi)
  - Change (10 years): ▼ −0.5%
- Demonym: Libygg

Official language
  - Norwegian form: Neutral
- Time zone: UTC+01:00 (CET)
  - Summer (DST): UTC+02:00 (CEST)
- ISO 3166 code: NO-1737

Sørli is a former municipality in the old Nord-Trøndelag county in Norway. The 1,431-square-kilometre (553 sq mi) municipality existed from 1915 until its dissolution in 1964. The area is now the southern part of Lierne Municipality in Trøndelag county. The administrative centre of the municipality was the village of Mebygda.

Prior to its dissolution in 1964, the 1,431-square-kilometre (553 sq mi) municipality was the 51st largest by area out of the 689 municipalities in Norway. Sørli Municipality was the 625th most populous municipality in Norway with a population of about 908. The municipality's population density was 0.6 inhabitants per square kilometre (1.6/sq mi) and its population had decreased by 0.5% over the previous 10-year period.

== General information ==
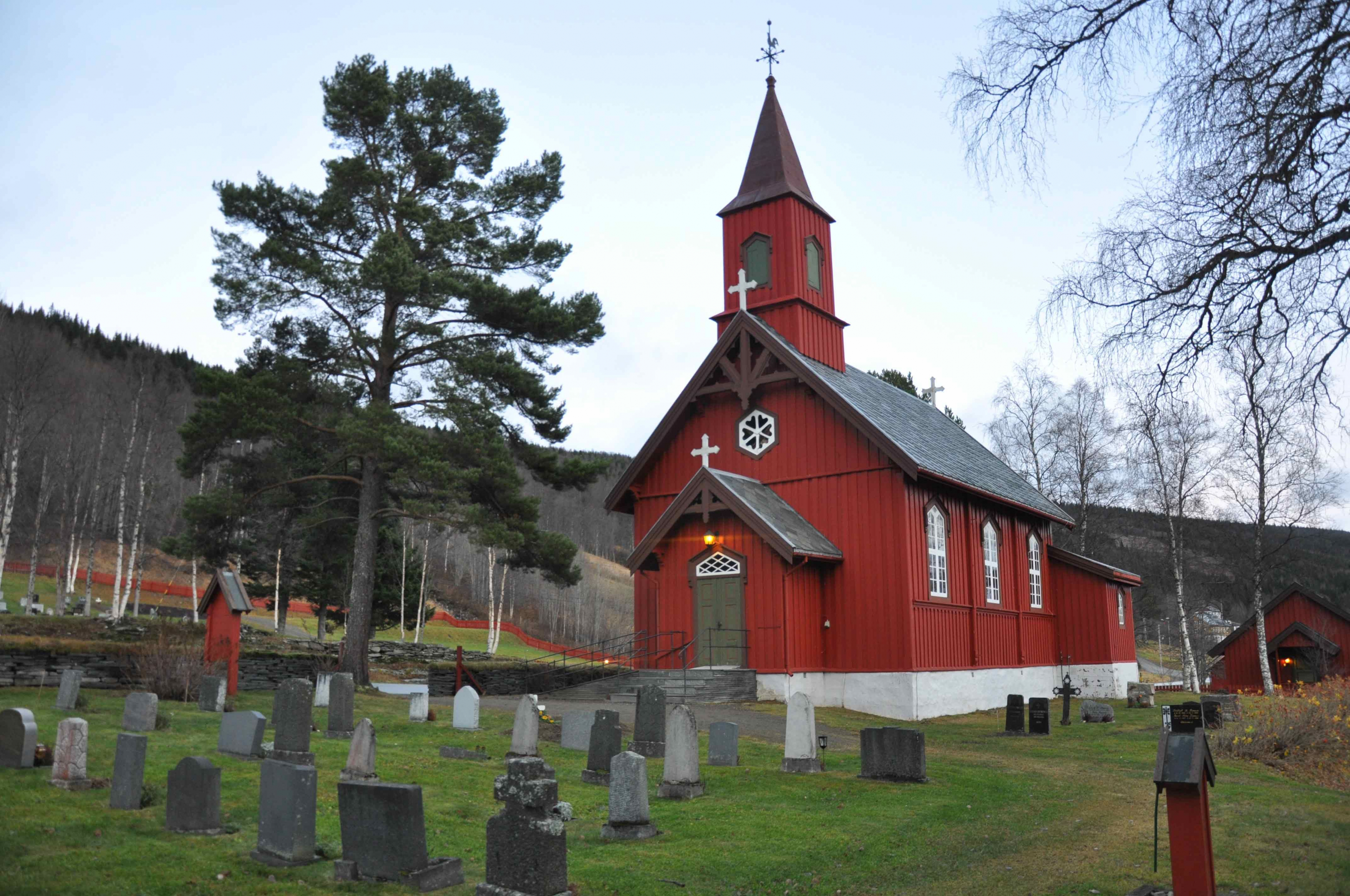
Sørli Church

The municipality of Sørli was established on 1 July 1915 when the old Lierne Municipality (sometimes referred to as Finnlierne) was split in two parts: Nordli Municipality (population: 863) in the north and Sørli Municipality (population: 739) in the south. The old Lierne Municipality had been created on 1 January 1874 when it was separated from the large Snåsa Municipality. During the 1960s, there were many municipal mergers across Norway due to the work of the Schei Committee. On 1 January 1964, the neighboring Sørli Municipality (population: 898) and Nordli Municipality (population: 1,147) were reunited to once again form Lierne Municipality.

=== Name ===
The municipal name is named after the old name for the region (Hlíð) which means "mountainside" (similar to the Norwegian word li). Historically, the prefix Finna- was often added to the name: Finnahlíð. This prefix is the plural genitive case of finnr which means "Sami person" (or Finn) because the district was historically populated by Sami people prior to the arrival of ethnic Norwegians. Later, the prefix was dropped and the definite plural form of li was used, Lierne. In 1915, the old municipality was divided into two parts: Nordli and Sørli. The names of these new municipalities came from the older name. The definite singular form of the name was used, li, and the prefix sør was added to show that this was the southern part of Li.

=== Churches ===
The Church of Norway had one parish (sokn) within Sørli Municipality. At the time of the municipal dissolution, it was part of the Lierne prestegjeld and the Indre Namdal prosti (deanery) in the Diocese of Nidaros.

Churches in Sørli Municipality
Parish (sokn)	Church name	Location of the church	Year built
Sørli	Sørli Church	Mebygda	1876

== Geography ==
The highest point in the municipality was the 1,390-metre (4,560 ft) tall mountain Hestkjøltoppen.

== Government ==
While it existed, Sørli Municipality was responsible for primary education (through 10th grade), outpatient health services, senior citizen services, welfare and other social services, zoning, economic development, and municipal roads and utilities. The municipality was governed by a municipal council of directly elected representatives. The mayor was indirectly elected by a vote of the municipal council. The municipality was under the jurisdiction of the Frostating Court of Appeal.

=== Municipal council ===
The municipal council (Herredsstyre) of Sørli Municipality was made up of representatives that were elected to four year terms. The tables below show the historical composition of the council by political party.

Sørli herredsstyre 1959–1963
Party name (in Norwegian)	Number of representatives
Labour Party (Arbeiderpartiet)	3
Christian Democratic Party (Kristelig Folkeparti)	2
Centre Party (Senterpartiet)	3
Liberal Party (Venstre)	5
Total number of members:	13
Note: On 1 January 1964, Sørli Municipality became part of Lierne Municipality.

Sørli herredsstyre 1955–1959
Party name (in Norwegian)	Number of representatives
Labour Party (Arbeiderpartiet)	4
Farmers' Party (Bondepartiet)	4
Liberal Party (Venstre)	5
Total number of members:	13

Sørli herredsstyre 1951–1955
Party name (in Norwegian)	Number of representatives
Labour Party (Arbeiderpartiet)	4
Joint List(s) of Non-Socialist Parties (Borgerlige Felleslister)	8
Total number of members:	12

Sørli herredsstyre 1947–1951
Party name (in Norwegian)	Number of representatives
Labour Party (Arbeiderpartiet)	4
Joint List(s) of Non-Socialist Parties (Borgerlige Felleslister)	8
Total number of members:	12

Sørli herredsstyre 1945–1947
Party name (in Norwegian)	Number of representatives
Labour Party (Arbeiderpartiet)	5
Joint List(s) of Non-Socialist Parties (Borgerlige Felleslister)	7
Total number of members:	12

Sørli herredsstyre 1937–1941*
Party name (in Norwegian)	Number of representatives
Local List(s) (Lokale lister)	12
Total number of members:	12
Note: Due to the German occupation of Norway during World War II, no elections were held for new municipal councils until after the war ended in 1945.

=== Mayors ===
The mayor (Norwegian: ordfører) of Sørli Municipality was the political leader of the municipality and the chairperson of the municipal council. Here is a list of people who held this position:

- 1915–1919: Hans H. Skjelbred
- 1920–1922: Theodor Brønstad
- 1923–1925: Paul P. Østborg
- 1926–1945: Teodor L. Østnor
- 1945–1945: Hans H. Udland
- 1946–1946: Frits Gravseth (Ap)
- 1946–1955: Emil Gåsbak (LL)
- 1956–1963: Ole Strand (V)

== See also ==
- List of former municipalities of Norway
