= Murusjøen =

Lake in Trøndelag, Norway

- Interactive map of the lake
- Location: Lierne Municipality, Trøndelag
- Coordinates: 64.4753°N 14.0408°E
- Basin countries: Norway
- Max. length: 8 kilometres (5.0 mi)
- Max. width: 1.5 kilometres (0.93 mi)
- Surface area: 7.2 km^{2} (2.8 sq mi)
- Shore length^{1}: 21.9 kilometres (13.6 mi)
- Surface elevation: 311 metres (1,020 ft)
- References: NVE
- ^{1} Shore length is not a well-defined measure.

Murusjøen is a lake in Lierne Municipality in Trøndelag county, Norway. The lake lies on the Norwegian side of the border with Sweden, just east of the lake Kvesjøen.

== See also ==
- List of lakes in Norway
