= Sealed train =

International rail transportation of individuals without passing through customs

Map of Lenin's 1917 journey in a sealed train

A sealed train is one that travels internationally under customs and/or immigration seal, without its contents legally recognized as entering or leaving the nations traversed between the beginning and end of the journey or subject to any otherwise applicable taxes.

== Background ==
The most notable use of a sealed train was the return of Vladimir Lenin to Russia from exile in Switzerland in 1917—in fact, that particular journey was not a true sealed train, because the passengers disembarked to spend the night in Frankfurt—but the practice was used a number of other times throughout the 20th century to allow the migration or transport of controversial individuals or peoples. For instance, sealed trains were used for repatriation of combatants in the Spanish Civil War, Jewish emigration from Nazi Germany to the United States, and expulsion of East German refugees to West Germany.

== See also ==
- Privileged transit traffic
