= Havdalsvatnet =

Lake in Trøndelag, Norway

Havdalsvatnet (Norwegian) Haavhtere (Southern Sami)
- Interactive map of the lake
- Location: Lierne Municipality, Trøndelag
- Coordinates: 64.6225°N 13.36416°E
- Basin countries: Norway
- Max. length: 6 kilometres (3.7 mi)
- Max. width: 2 kilometres (1.2 mi)
- Surface area: 8.12 km^{2} (3.14 sq mi)
- Shore length^{1}: 18.68 kilometres (11.61 mi)
- Surface elevation: 594 metres (1,949 ft)
- References: NVE
- ^{1} Shore length is not a well-defined measure.

Havdalsvatnet (Norwegian) or Haavhtere (Southern Sami) is a lake in Lierne Municipality in Trøndelag county, Norway. The 8.12-square-kilometre (3.14 sq mi) lake lies in the northern part of the municipality, just south of the large lake Tunnsjøen. The village of Tunnsjø senter lies about 14 kilometres (8.7 mi) east of the lake and the lake Skorovatn (in neighboring Namsskogan Municipality) lies about 8 kilometres (5.0 mi) to the west.

== See also ==
- List of lakes in Norway
