= Ramani Nordli =

Norwegian politician (born 1999)

Ramani Konstanse Cornels Nordli (born 12 March 1999) is a Norwegian politician for the Labour Party.

She hails from Arendal and is a daughter of Arendal mayor Robert Cornels Nordli. Her mother was born in India.

Nordli was elected as a deputy representative to the Parliament of Norway from Aust-Agder for the term 2021–2025.
