= Laksjøen =

Lake in Trøndelag, Norway

- Interactive map of the lake
- Location: Lierne Municipality, Trøndelag
- Coordinates: 64.4525°N 13.5207°E
- Basin countries: Norway
- Max. length: 10 kilometres (6.2 mi)
- Max. width: 2.5 kilometres (1.6 mi)
- Surface area: 19.2 km^{2} (7.4 sq mi)
- Shore length^{1}: 35.2 kilometres (21.9 mi)
- Surface elevation: 398 metres (1,306 ft)
- References: NVE
- ^{1} Shore length is not a well-defined measure.

Laksjøen is a lake in Lierne Municipality in Trøndelag county, Norway. It has a surface area of 19.2 square kilometres (7.4 sq mi). The administrative center of Lierne, Sandvika, lies on the northern shore of the lake. The lake is fed by the lake Sandsjøen to the east, and the water exits the lake in the north and later joins the river Sanddøla which later joins the river Namsen.

== See also ==
- List of lakes in Norway
