= Gusvatnet =

Lake in Trøndelag, Norway

Gusvatnet (Norwegian) Stoerenjuananjaevrie (Southern Sami)
- Interactive map of the lake
- Location: Lierne Municipality, Trøndelag
- Coordinates: 64.2825°N 13.4889°E
- Primary outflows: Guselva
- Basin countries: Norway
- Max. length: 5.5 kilometres (3.4 mi)
- Max. width: 1 kilometre (0.62 mi)
- Surface area: 4 km^{2} (1.5 sq mi)
- Shore length^{1}: 13.52 kilometres (8.40 mi)
- Surface elevation: 536 metres (1,759 ft)
- References: NVE
- ^{1} Shore length is not a well-defined measure.

Gusvatnet (Norwegian) or Stoerenjuananjaevrie (Southern Sami) is a lake in Lierne Municipality in Trøndelag county, Norway. The 4-square-kilometre (1.5 sq mi) lake flows out into the river Guselva which flows a short distance into the larger lake Lenglingen.

== See also ==
- List of lakes in Norway
