= Tunnsjø Chapel =

Church in Trøndelag, Norway

- Tunnsjø kapell
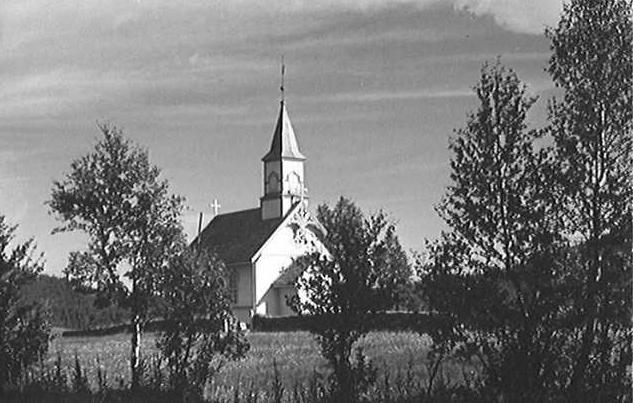
- View of the chapel
- Tunnsjø Chapel
- 64.6841237°N 13.64479288°E
- Location: Lierne Municipality, Trøndelag
- Country: Norway
- Denomination: Church of Norway
- Churchmanship: Evangelical Lutheran

History
- Status: Chapel
- Founded: 1876
- Consecrated: 22 April 1876

Architecture
- Functional status: Active
- Architect: Carl Julius Bergstrøm
- Architectural type: Long church
- Style: Neo-Gothic
- Completed: 1876 (150 years ago)

Specifications
- Capacity: 100
- Materials: Wood

Administration
- Diocese: Nidaros bispedømme
- Deanery: Namdal prosti
- Parish: Nordli
- Norwegian Cultural Heritage Site
- Type: Church
- Status: Not protected
- ID: 85688

Tunnsjø Chapel (Norwegian: Tunnsjø kapell) is a chapel of the Church of Norway in Lierne Municipality in Trøndelag county, Norway. It is located in the village of Tunnsjø senter. It is an annex chapel for the Nordli parish which is part of the Namdal prosti (deanery) in the Diocese of Nidaros. The white, wooden, Neo-Gothic church was built in a long church style in 1876 using plans drawn up by the architect Carl Julius Bergstrøm. The chapel seats about 100 people. The church was consecrated on 22 April 1876.

== See also ==
- List of churches in Nidaros
