= Sigvard Jonsson =

Swedish cross-country skier

Personal information
- Born: 27 February 1923 Bodums socken, Sweden
- Died: 17 September 1969 (aged 46) Bodums socken, Sweden

Sport
- Sport: Skiing
- Club: Rossöns IF

Bengt Sigvard Jonsson (27 February 1923, Bodums socken, Sweden – 17 September 1969, at the same place) was a Swedish cross-country skier and lumberjack. He represented Rossöns IF at the club level and won the Vasaloppet in 1956. He died in a drowning accident.
