= Nordlie =

Nordlie, also spelled Nordli is a surname of Norwegian origin. In Norwegian and Danish the name means "northern slope" or "northern hill". The surname consists of two components: nord meaning north, and lie (Danish)/ li (Norwegian) meaning slope or hill. While not as common in Denmark or among people of Danish descent, the Danish spelling is used because Danish was long the written language for Norwegian. The surname is a homophone with the word nordlig which means "northern".

Examples of the name in use includes:

- Arthur Nordlie (1883–1965), Conservative politician, entrepreneur of Norwegian football.
- Bjørg Nordli-Mathisen (b. 1966), Norwegian jewellery designer (Bjørg Jewellery) whose designs are worn by globally recognized artists such as Rihanna and Madonna.
- Frank Nordli (1937–1998), Norwegian TV personality.
- Irene Nordli (b. 1967), Norwegian artist.
- Jens Henrik Nordlie (1910–1996), Norwegian resistance fighter during WW2 German occupation. After the war leader of the secret anti-Communist operation Stay Behind. CEO of the newsstand company Narvesen 1957–1975, co-founder of the freedom-of-speech oriented foundation Fritt Ord.
- Leif Jostein Nordli (b. 1966), Norwegian football player.
- Mai Britt Nordli (b. 1954), Norwegian Center Party politician. Mayor of Hole municipality 1992-1995.
- Morten Nordli (b. 1971), Norwegian speed skater.
- Odvar Nordli (1926–2018), Labor party politician, Norwegian prime minister 1976-1981.
- Ragnar Nordli (1911–1944), Norwegian Communist resistance fighter during German WW2 occupation.
- Tom Nordlie (b. 1962), Norwegian football coach.
- Vidar Nordli-Mathisen (b. 1955), head of Norwegian public broadcasting 2005-2009.
- Åsne Valland Nordlie (b. 1975), Norwegian singer and humanitarian.
