= Rengen =

Lake on the border of Norway and Sweden

- Interactive map of the lake
- Location: Lierne (Trøndelag) and Krokom (Jämtland)
- Coordinates: 64.0985°N 13.9829°E
- Basin countries: Norway, Sweden
- Max. length: 12 kilometres (7.5 mi)
- Max. width: 2.8 kilometres (1.7 mi)
- Surface area: 21.5 km^{2} (8.3 sq mi)
- Shore length^{1}: 42.05 kilometres (26.13 mi)
- Surface elevation: 345 metres (1,132 ft)
- References: NVE
- ^{1} Shore length is not a well-defined measure.

Rengen is a lake on the border between Sweden and Norway. The 21.49-square-kilometre (8.30 sq mi) lake covers 15.72 square kilometres (6.07 sq mi) in Norway and 5.77 square kilometres (2.23 sq mi) in Sweden. The Norwegian part is located in Lierne Municipality in Trøndelag county, and the Swedish part is located in Krokom Municipality in Jämtland County. Water flows into Rengen from the lake Ulen to the north.

== See also ==
- List of lakes in Norway
