= Irene Nordli =

Norwegian artist

Irene Nordli (born 23 December 1967) is a Norwegian visual artist and sculptor living and working in Oslo and in Heestrand, Sweden.

Irene Nordli works with ceramic sculptures and larger scale works where she among other themes works with animal and human hybrids in various degrees of abstraction. She has had a number of solo exhibitions and has been part of a large number of group exhibitions both in Norway and internationally. She has also been commissioned to produce a number of public works in Norway - in Asker, Lillestrøm, Halden prison, and Bodø amongst others.

Irene Nordli graduated from Bergen Academy of Art and Design in 1996 and currently teaches at the Art and craft department at the Oslo National Academy of the Arts in Oslo. She was awarded a Norwegian Government Grant for Artists in 2010.
