= Nordli Church =

Church in Trøndelag, Norway

- Nordli kirke
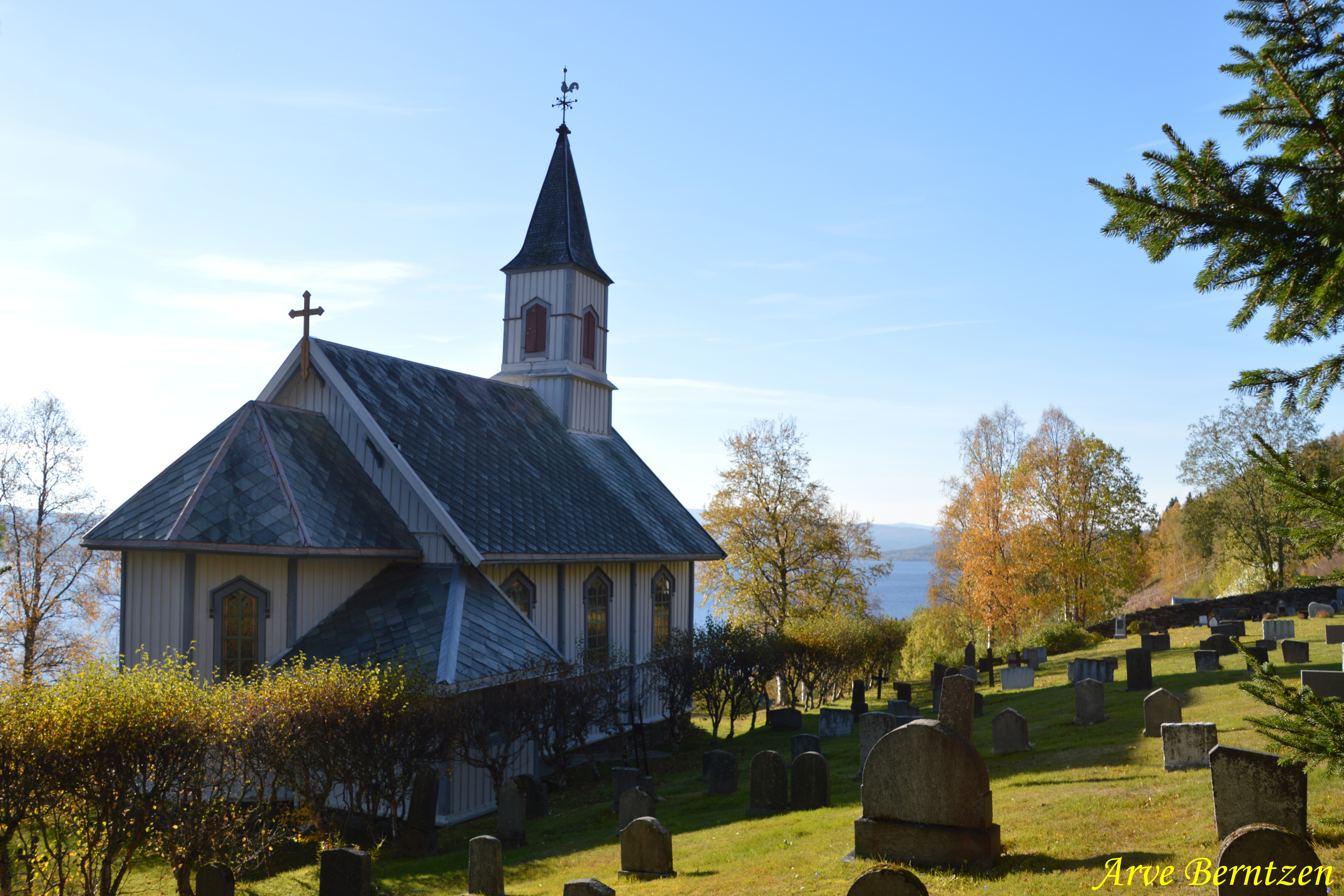
- View of the church
- Nordli Church
- 64.4675341°N 13.5907142°E
- Location: Lierne Municipality, Trøndelag
- Country: Norway
- Denomination: Church of Norway
- Churchmanship: Evangelical Lutheran

History
- Status: Parish church
- Founded: 1636
- Consecrated: 1873

Architecture
- Functional status: Active
- Architect: Carl Julius Bergstrøm
- Architectural type: Long church
- Style: Neo-gothic
- Completed: 1873 (153 years ago)

Specifications
- Capacity: 250
- Materials: Wood

Administration
- Diocese: Nidaros bispedømme
- Deanery: Namdal prosti
- Parish: Nordli
- Norwegian Cultural Heritage Site
- Type: Church
- Status: Listed
- ID: 85157

Nordli Church (Norwegian: Nordli kirke) is a parish church of the Church of Norway in Lierne Municipality in Trøndelag county, Norway. It is located in the village of Sandvika. It is the main church for the Nordli parish which is part of the Namdal prosti (deanery) in the Diocese of Nidaros. The white, wooden church was built in a long church style in 1873 using plans drawn up by the architect Carl J. Bergstrøm. The church seats about 250 people.

== History ==
The first church in Sandvika was built in 1636. In 1790, the old church was torn down and replaced with a new building. In 1873, the old church was torn down and replaced with a new timber-framed building. The church was designed as a long church in a Neo-gothic style with a nave and choir. It also has a sacristy on the north side of the choir and an entry porch on the west end of the nave.

== See also ==
- List of churches in Nidaros
