= Sørli Church =

Church in Trøndelag, Norway

- Sørli kirke
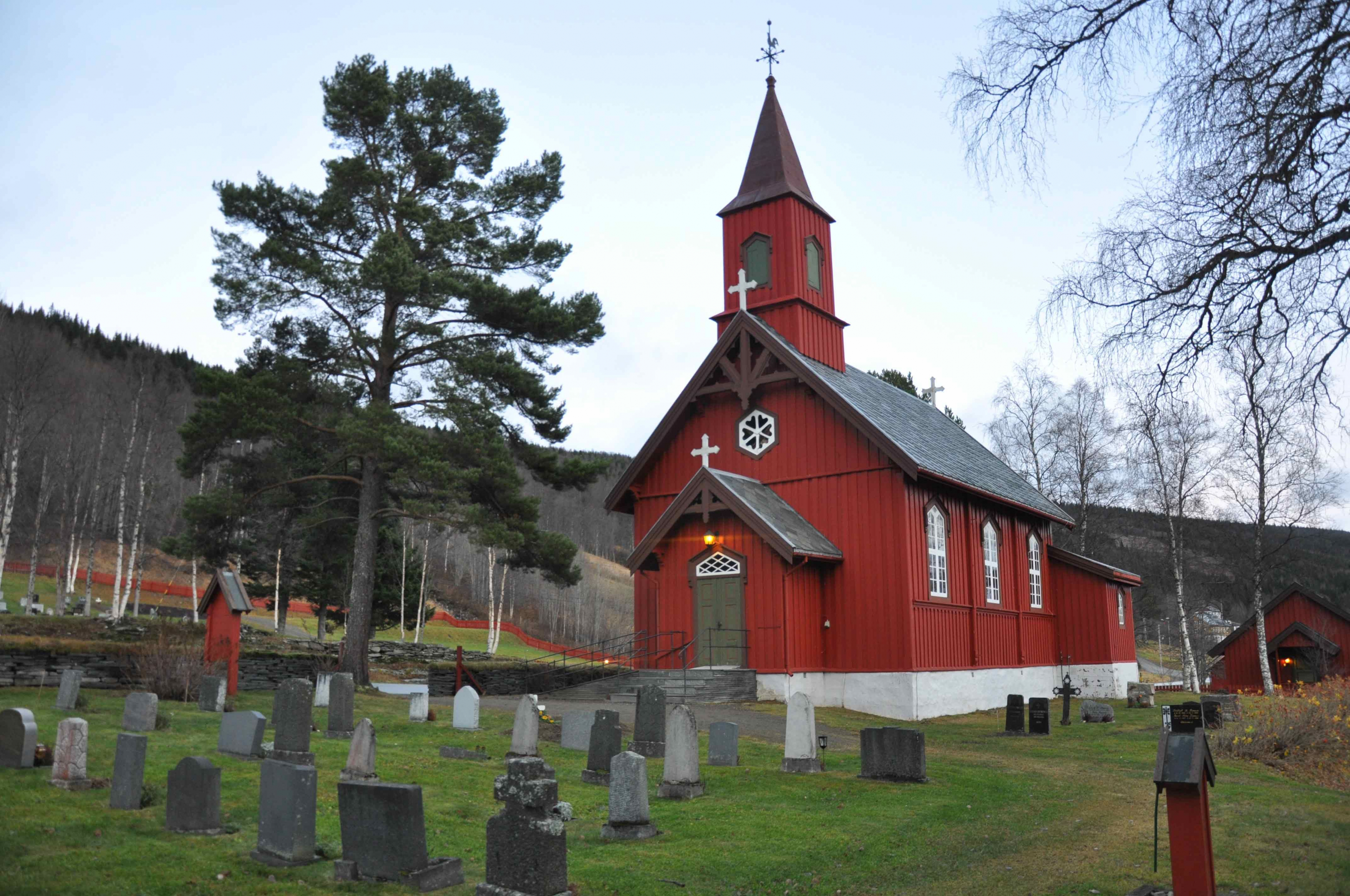
- View of the church
- Sørli Church
- 64.2485117°N 13.7485581°E
- Location: Lierne Municipality, Trøndelag
- Country: Norway
- Denomination: Church of Norway
- Churchmanship: Evangelical Lutheran

History
- Status: Parish church
- Founded: 14th century
- Consecrated: 1873

Architecture
- Functional status: Active
- Architect: Carl J. Bergstrøm
- Architectural type: Long church
- Style: Neo-Gothic
- Completed: 1873 (153 years ago)

Specifications
- Capacity: 250
- Materials: Wood

Administration
- Diocese: Nidaros bispedømme
- Deanery: Namdal prosti
- Parish: Sørli
- Norwegian Cultural Heritage Site
- Type: Church
- Status: Not protected
- ID: 85055

Sørli Church (Norwegian: Sørli kirke; local pronunciation: Søli-kjærsja) is a parish church of the Church of Norway in Lierne Municipality in Trøndelag county, Norway. It is located in the village of Mebygda. It is the church for the Sørli parish which is part of the Namdal prosti (deanery) in the Diocese of Nidaros. The red, wooden, Neo-Gothic church was built in a long church style in 1873 using plans drawn up by the architect Carl Julius Bergstrøm. The church seats 250 about people.

== History ==
The earliest existing historical records of the church date back to the year 1548, but the church was not new that year. The first church here was a stave church that was built about 40 metres (130 ft) west of the present church site on the Devika farm (historically the church was sometimes called Devik Church). Not much is known about the old medieval church. In 1613, the Swedish Army burned the church down during the Kalmar War. In 1616, a new church was built on the site of the old church. The new church was pretty small and by 1867 the church was described as being in poor condition. In 1873, a new building was constructed about 40 metres (130 ft) east of the old church. After the new building was completed, the old church was torn down.

== See also ==
- List of churches in Nidaros
