= Lierne Municipality =

Municipality in Trøndelag, Norway

Lierne Municipality Lierne kommune Lijre
- Municipality
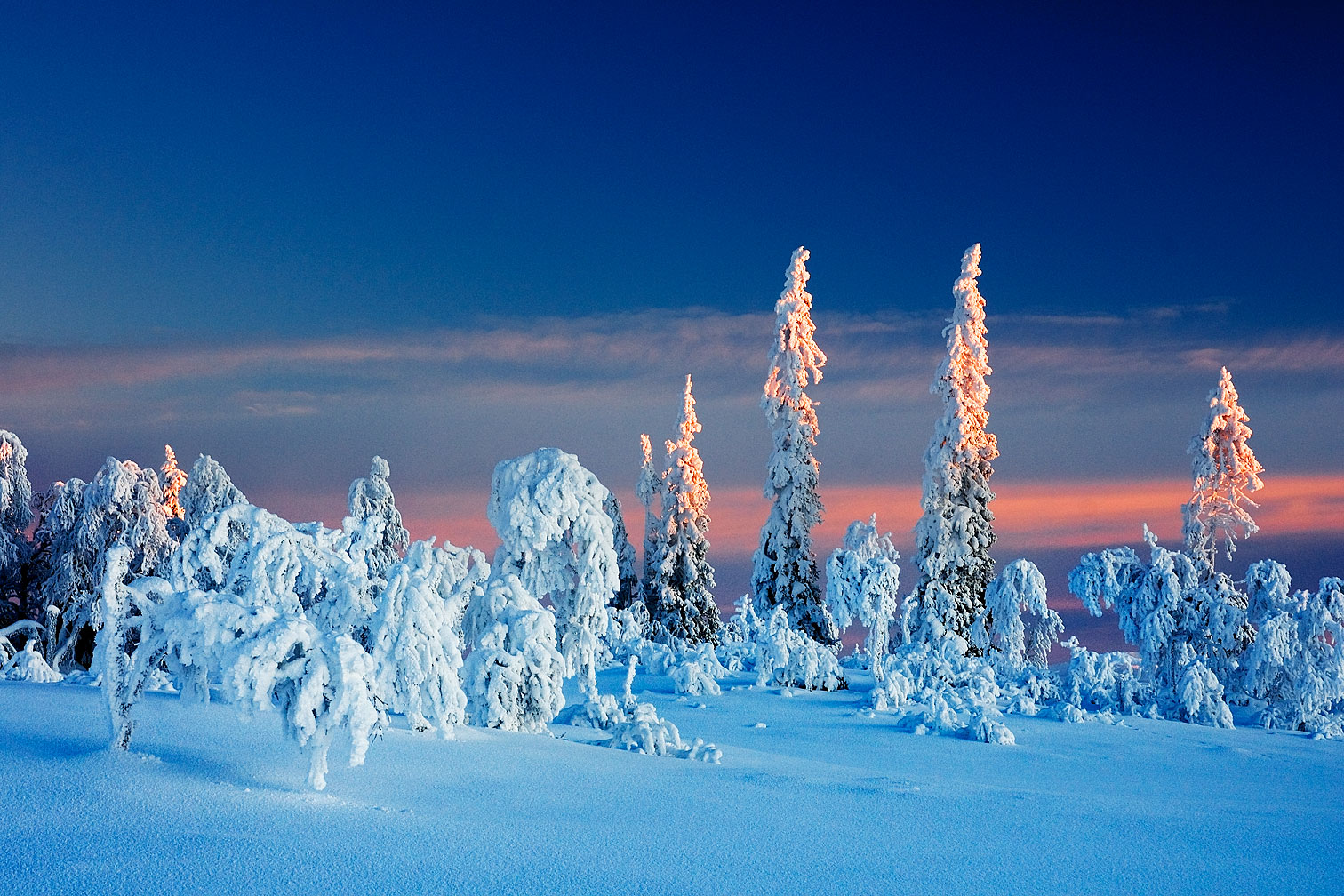
- Winter in Lierne

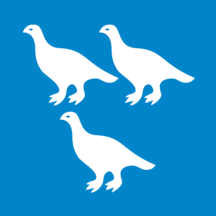
- Flag Coat of arms

- Trøndelag within Norway

- Lierne within Trøndelag
- Coordinates: 64°22′34″N 13°36′35″E
- Country: Norway
- County: Trøndelag
- District: Namdalen
- Established: 1 Jan 1874
  - Preceded by: Snaasen Municipality
- Disestablished: 1 Jan 1915
  - Succeeded by: Nordli and Sørli
- Re-established: 1 Jan 1964
  - Preceded by: Nordli and Sørli
- Administrative centre: Sandvika

Government
  - Mayor (2023): Tor Erling Inderdal (Sp)

Area
  - Total: 2,961.70 km^{2} (1,143.52 sq mi)
  - Land: 2,630.45 km^{2} (1,015.62 sq mi)
  - Water: 331.25 km^{2} (127.90 sq mi) 11.2%
  - Rank: #16 in Norway
- Highest elevation: 1,390.09 m (4,560.7 ft)

Population (2024)
  - Total: 1,301
  - Rank: #314 in Norway
  - Density: 0.4/km^{2} (1.0/sq mi)
  - Change (10 years): ▼ −6.1%
- Demonym: Libygg

Official language
  - Norwegian form: Neutral
- Time zone: UTC+01:00 (CET)
  - Summer (DST): UTC+02:00 (CEST)
- ISO 3166 code: NO-5042
- Website: Official website

Lierne or Lijre (Southern Sami) is a municipality in Trøndelag county, Norway. It is part of the Namdalen region, and it is the largest municipality by area in Trøndelag. The administrative centre of the municipality is the village of Sandvika. Other villages include Inderdal, Mebygda, and Tunnsjø senter. The municipality borders Sweden to the south and east. Most of Lierne Municipality lies on the Swedish side of the drainage divide between Norway and Sweden.

The 2,962-square-kilometre (1,144 sq mi) municipality is the 16th largest by area out of the 357 municipalities in Norway. Lierne Municipality is the 314th most populous municipality in Norway with a population of 1,301. The municipality's population density is 0.4 inhabitants per square kilometre (1.0/sq mi) and its population has decreased by 6.1% over the previous 10-year period.

== General information ==
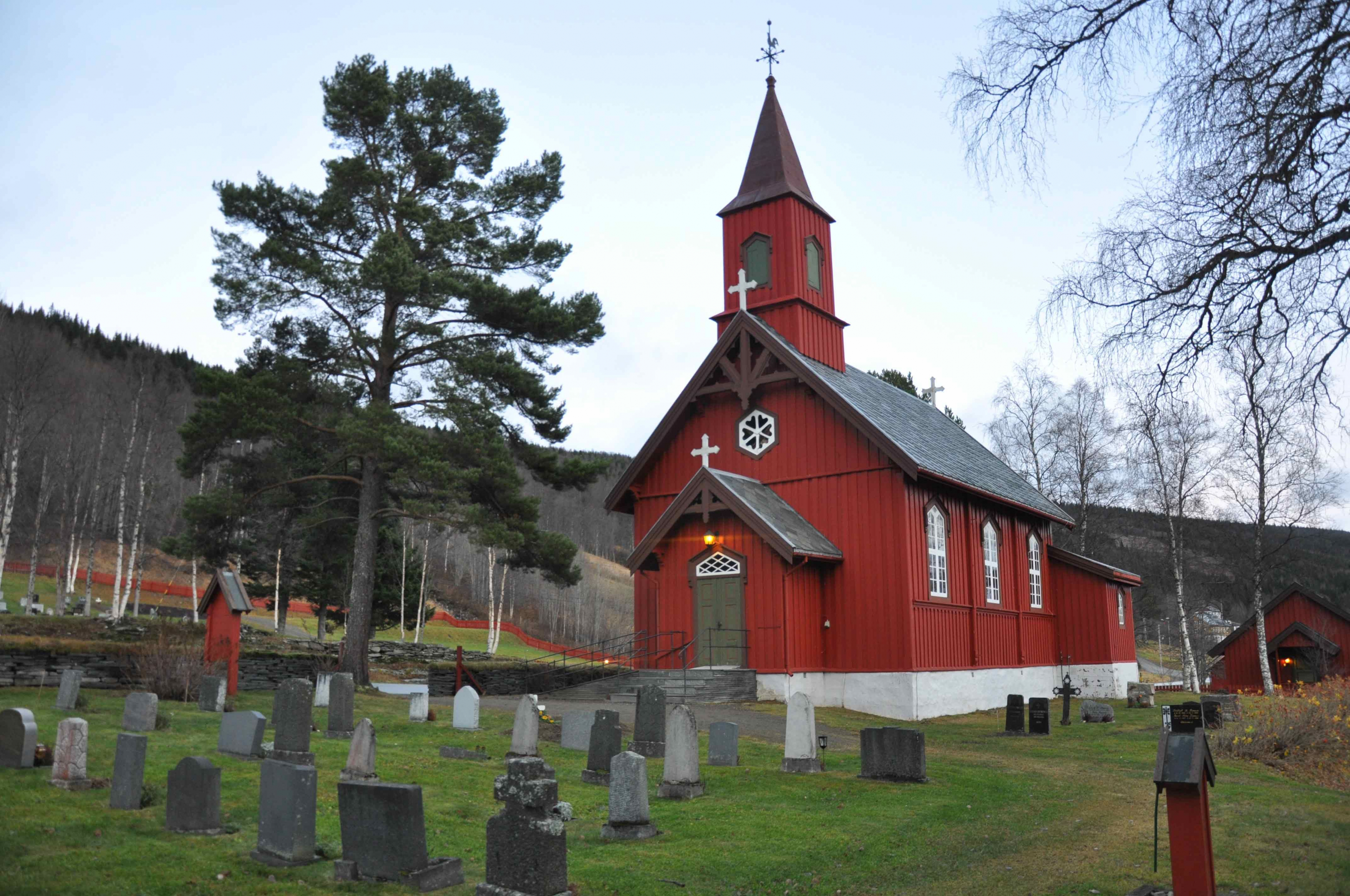
Sørli Church

The municipality of Lierne was established on 1 January 1874 when it was separated from the large Snaasen Municipality. Initially, the population of Lierne Municipality was 1,015. On 1 July 1915, it was divided into two: Nordli Municipality (population: 863) in the north and Sørli Municipality (population: 739) in the south. This division, however, was short-lived. During the 1960s, there were many municipal mergers across Norway due to the work of the Schei Committee. On 1 January 1964, Nordli Municipality and Sørli Municipality were merged back together again under the former name Lierne Municipality. After the merger, there were 2,045 residents in the new municipality.

On 1 January 2018, the municipality switched from the old Nord-Trøndelag county to the new Trøndelag county.

=== Name ===
The municipality (originally the parish) is named after the old name for the region (Old Norse: Hlíð) which means "mountainside" (similar to the Norwegian word li). Historically, the prefix Finna- was often added to the name: Finnahlíð. This prefix is the plural genitive case of finnr which means "Sami person" (or Finn) because the district historically had a significant sami population. Later, the prefix was dropped and the definite plural form of li was used, Lierne. The li name lives on in many places in the municipality such as Nordli and Sørli.

=== Coat of arms ===
The coat of arms was granted on 3 February 1984. The official blazon is "Azure, three grouse argent, two over one" (Norwegian: I blått tre stående sølv ryper, to over en). This means the arms have a colour field (background) and the charge is three willow grouse (Lagopus lagopus), a local species of grouse. The grouse design has a tincture of argent which means it is commonly coloured white, but if it is made out of metal, then silver is used. This design was chosen because these birds are plentiful in the area. Historically, hunting grouse was of great importance for the survival of the inhabitants during the winters. The bird was thus chosen as a symbol for the municipality. The arms were designed by Einar H. Skjervold.

=== Churches ===
The Church of Norway has two parishes (sokn) within Lierne Municipality. It is part of the Namdal prosti (deanery) in the Diocese of Nidaros.

Churches in Lierne Municipality
| Parish (sokn) | Church name | Location of the church | Year built |
|---|---|---|---|
| Nordli | Nordli Church | Sandvika | 1873 |
| Nordli | Tunnsjø Chapel | Tunnsjø senter | 1876 |
| Sørli | Sørli Church | Mebygda | 1873 |

== Geography ==
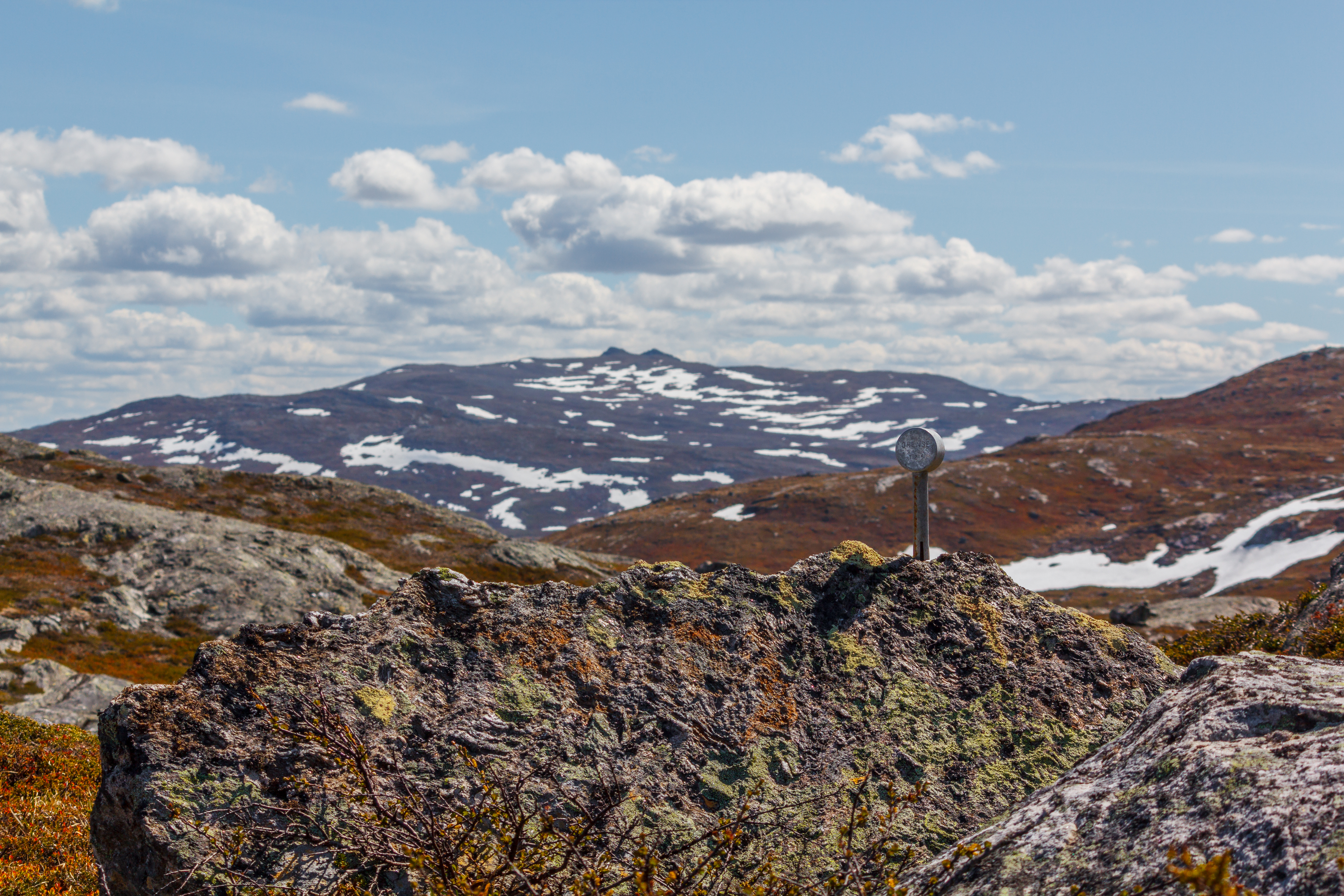
View of the mountains along the Lierne - Sweden border

Lierne National Park is located in the municipality, and Blåfjella-Skjækerfjella National Park is partly located in Lierne. Lierne Municipality has a significant population of brown bears. The highest point in the municipality is the 1,390.09-metre (4,560.7 ft) tall mountain Hestkjøltoppen.

Lierne is also home to many lakes, including Gusvatnet, Havdalsvatnet, Holden, Ingelsvatnet, Kingen, Kvesjøen, Laksjøen, Lenglingen, Limingen, Murusjøen, Rengen, Sandsjøen, Stortissvatnet, Tunnsjøen, and Ulen.

== Climate ==
Climate data for Nordli - Holand 1991-2020 (433 m)
| Month | Jan | Feb | Mar | Apr | May | Jun | Jul | Aug | Sep | Oct | Nov | Dec | Year |
|---|---|---|---|---|---|---|---|---|---|---|---|---|---|
| Mean daily maximum °C (°F) | −3.1 (26.4) | −3.3 (26.1) | 0 (32) | 4.8 (40.6) | 10.2 (50.4) | 14.7 (58.5) | 18.1 (64.6) | 16.6 (61.9) | 11.5 (52.7) | 5 (41) | 0.5 (32.9) | −2 (28) | 6.1 (42.9) |
| Daily mean °C (°F) | −6.5 (20.3) | −6.8 (19.8) | −3.9 (25.0) | 0.7 (33.3) | 5.6 (42.1) | 10.2 (50.4) | 13.2 (55.8) | 12.2 (54.0) | 7.8 (46.0) | 2.3 (36.1) | −2 (28) | −4.7 (23.5) | 2.3 (36.2) |
| Mean daily minimum °C (°F) | −10.2 (13.6) | −10.3 (13.5) | −8 (18) | −3.2 (26.2) | 1.4 (34.5) | 5.9 (42.6) | 9.1 (48.4) | 8.3 (46.9) | 4.9 (40.8) | 0.2 (32.4) | −4.3 (24.3) | −8.1 (17.4) | −1.2 (29.9) |
| Average precipitation mm (inches) | 73.5 (2.89) | 68 (2.7) | 67.9 (2.67) | 43.9 (1.73) | 41.1 (1.62) | 71.9 (2.83) | 87.3 (3.44) | 73.9 (2.91) | 77.1 (3.04) | 72.9 (2.87) | 65.5 (2.58) | 83.3 (3.28) | 826.3 (32.56) |
| Average precipitation days | 16 | 15 | 14 | 10 | 11 | 13 | 14 | 14 | 14 | 15 | 15 | 18 | 169 |
Source: NOAA

== History ==
Lierne Municipality was the largest obstacle in the negotiations before the Stromstad Treaty of 1751 in which the border was defined in detail. Sweden wanted it based on its location on the eastern side of the drainage divide, although Norway got it based on its historic connection to the Snaasen prestegjeld in Norway. As compensation Norway gave up its demand for the Idre and Särna parishes which were under Swedish control since 1644. This is why there is a large curve in the national border.

== Government ==
Lierne Municipality is responsible for primary education (through 10th grade), outpatient health services, senior citizen services, welfare and other social services, zoning, economic development, and municipal roads and utilities. The municipality is governed by a municipal council of directly elected representatives. The mayor is indirectly elected by a vote of the municipal council. The municipality is under the jurisdiction of the Trøndelag District Court and the Frostating Court of Appeal.

Municipal waste management has since 2020 been handled by the inter-municipal Midtre Namdal Avfallsselskap, with ReTrans Midt handling waste collection.

=== Municipal council ===
The municipal council (Kommunestyre) of Lierne Municipality is made up of 15 representatives that are elected to four year terms. The tables below show the current and historical composition of the council by political party.

Lierne kommunestyre 2023–2027
| Party name (in Norwegian) | Number of representatives |
|---|---|
| Labour Party (Arbeiderpartiet) | 7 |
| Centre Party (Senterpartiet) | 7 |
| Liberal Party (Venstre) | 1 |
| Total number of members: | 15 |

Lierne kommunestyre 2019–2023
| Party name (in Norwegian) | Number of representatives |
|---|---|
| Labour Party (Arbeiderpartiet) | 9 |
| Centre Party (Senterpartiet) | 5 |
| Liberal Party (Venstre) | 1 |
| Total number of members: | 15 |

Lierne kommunestyre 2015–2019
| Party name (in Norwegian) | Number of representatives |
|---|---|
| Labour Party (Arbeiderpartiet) | 7 |
| Centre Party (Senterpartiet) | 6 |
| Liberal Party (Venstre) | 2 |
| Total number of members: | 15 |

Lierne kommunestyre 2011–2015
| Party name (in Norwegian) | Number of representatives |
|---|---|
| Labour Party (Arbeiderpartiet) | 8 |
| Christian Democratic Party (Kristelig Folkeparti) | 1 |
| Centre Party (Senterpartiet) | 4 |
| Lierne Local List (Lierne Bygdeliste) | 2 |
| Total number of members: | 15 |

Lierne kommunestyre 2007–2011
| Party name (in Norwegian) | Number of representatives |
|---|---|
| Labour Party (Arbeiderpartiet) | 8 |
| Centre Party (Senterpartiet) | 5 |
| Liberal Party (Venstre) | 1 |
| Lierne local list (Lierne bygdeliste) | 1 |
| Total number of members: | 15 |

Lierne kommunestyre 2003–2007
| Party name (in Norwegian) | Number of representatives |
|---|---|
| Labour Party (Arbeiderpartiet) | 6 |
| Centre Party (Senterpartiet) | 8 |
| Socialist Left Party (Sosialistisk Venstreparti) | 1 |
| Liberal Party (Venstre) | 1 |
| Lierne local list (Lierne Bygdeliste) | 1 |
| Total number of members: | 17 |

Lierne kommunestyre 1999–2003
| Party name (in Norwegian) | Number of representatives |
|---|---|
| Labour Party (Arbeiderpartiet) | 7 |
| Christian Democratic Party (Kristelig Folkeparti) | 1 |
| Centre Party (Senterpartiet) | 9 |
| Socialist Left Party (Sosialistisk Venstreparti) | 1 |
| Liberal Party (Venstre) | 1 |
| Local list (Bygdeliste) | 2 |
| Total number of members: | 21 |

Lierne kommunestyre 1995–1999
| Party name (in Norwegian) | Number of representatives |
|---|---|
| Labour Party (Arbeiderpartiet) | 7 |
| Centre Party (Senterpartiet) | 10 |
| Socialist Left Party (Sosialistisk Venstreparti) | 1 |
| Joint list of the Liberal Party (Venstre) and Christian Democratic Party (Kristelig Folkeparti) | 1 |
| Lierne local list (Lierne Bygdeliste) | 2 |
| Total number of members: | 21 |

Lierne kommunestyre 1991–1995
| Party name (in Norwegian) | Number of representatives |
|---|---|
| Labour Party (Arbeiderpartiet) | 7 |
| Centre Party (Senterpartiet) | 6 |
| Socialist Left Party (Sosialistisk Venstreparti) | 2 |
| Joint list of the Conservative Party (Høyre), Christian Democratic Party (Kristelig Folkeparti), and Liberal Party (Venstre) | 4 |
| Lierne local list (Lierne Bygdeliste) | 2 |
| Total number of members: | 21 |

Lierne kommunestyre 1987–1991
| Party name (in Norwegian) | Number of representatives |
|---|---|
| Labour Party (Arbeiderpartiet) | 10 |
| Conservative Party (Høyre) | 1 |
| Christian Democratic Party (Kristelig Folkeparti) | 2 |
| Centre Party (Senterpartiet) | 4 |
| Liberal Party (Venstre) | 1 |
| Lierne local list (Lierne Bygdeliste) | 3 |
| Total number of members: | 21 |

Lierne kommunestyre 1983–1987
| Party name (in Norwegian) | Number of representatives |
|---|---|
| Labour Party (Arbeiderpartiet) | 9 |
| Conservative Party (Høyre) | 2 |
| Christian Democratic Party (Kristelig Folkeparti) | 2 |
| Liberal People's Party (Liberale Folkepartiet) | 1 |
| Centre Party (Senterpartiet) | 5 |
| Liberal Party (Venstre) | 2 |
| Total number of members: | 21 |

Lierne kommunestyre 1979–1983
| Party name (in Norwegian) | Number of representatives |
|---|---|
| Labour Party (Arbeiderpartiet) | 7 |
| Conservative Party (Høyre) | 2 |
| Christian Democratic Party (Kristelig Folkeparti) | 2 |
| New People's Party (Nye Folkepartiet) | 1 |
| Centre Party (Senterpartiet) | 5 |
| Liberal Party (Venstre) | 3 |
| Non-party list (Upolitisk liste) | 1 |
| Total number of members: | 21 |

Lierne kommunestyre 1975–1979
| Party name (in Norwegian) | Number of representatives |
|---|---|
| Labour Party (Arbeiderpartiet) | 7 |
| Christian Democratic Party (Kristelig Folkeparti) | 2 |
| New People's Party (Nye Folkepartiet) | 1 |
| Centre Party (Senterpartiet) | 7 |
| Liberal Party (Venstre) | 3 |
| Local List(s) (Lokale lister) | 1 |
| Total number of members: | 21 |

Lierne kommunestyre 1971–1975
| Party name (in Norwegian) | Number of representatives |
|---|---|
| Labour Party (Arbeiderpartiet) | 7 |
| Conservative Party (Høyre) | 1 |
| Christian Democratic Party (Kristelig Folkeparti) | 2 |
| Centre Party (Senterpartiet) | 4 |
| Liberal Party (Venstre) | 5 |
| Local List(s) (Lokale lister) | 2 |
| Total number of members: | 21 |

Lierne kommunestyre 1967–1971
| Party name (in Norwegian) | Number of representatives |
|---|---|
| Labour Party (Arbeiderpartiet) | 8 |
| Conservative Party (Høyre) | 1 |
| Christian Democratic Party (Kristelig Folkeparti) | 1 |
| Centre Party (Senterpartiet) | 4 |
| Liberal Party (Venstre) | 7 |
| Total number of members: | 21 |

Lierne kommunestyre 1964–1967
| Party name (in Norwegian) | Number of representatives |
|---|---|
| Labour Party (Arbeiderpartiet) | 7 |
| Conservative Party (Høyre) | 1 |
| Christian Democratic Party (Kristelig Folkeparti) | 2 |
| Centre Party (Senterpartiet) | 4 |
| Liberal Party (Venstre) | 7 |
| Total number of members: | 21 |
Note: On 1 January 1964, Lierne Municipality was established upon the merger of Nordli Municipality and Sørli Municipality.

=== Mayors ===
The mayor (Norwegian: ordfører) of Lierne is the political leader of the municipality and the chairperson of the municipal council. Here is a list of people who have held this position:

- 1874–1878: Georg Severin Schielderup
- 1878–1879: Jens Larsen Kveli
- 1880–1887: Ivar Hesselberg
- 1888–1889: John Malvig
- 1890–1901: Jakob F. Holand
- 1902–1904: Lornts Mediaas
- 1905–1907: John A. Dahl
- 1908–1910: Einar Zarbell
- 1910–1915: Jakob F. Holand
- (Lierne Municipality did not exist from 1916–1964)
- 1964–1965: Ola H. Kveli (V)
- 1966–1971: Ragnar Harbækvold (Sp)
- 1972–1975: Leif Sander Aagård (DLF)
- 1976–1979: Jon Leon Estil (Sp)
- 1980–1983: Reidar Kveli (Sp)
- 1984–1987: Jon Leon Estil (Sp)
- 1988–1991: Bernt Hågensen (Ap)
- 1991–1991: Gun Kveli (Ap)
- 1991–2007: Arnodd Lillemark (Sp)
- 2007–2015: Alf Robert Arvasli (Ap)
- 2015–2021: Bente Estil (Ap)
- 2021–2023: Reidar Rødli (Ap)
- 2023–present: Tor Erling Inderdal (Sp)

== Attractions ==
The cross-country race Flyktningerennet is held here every year. It is a race that follows a route from Nordli to Gäddede in Strömsund Municipality, Sweden, in remembrance of the people who fled Nazi German-occupied Norway for Sweden during the Second World War.

== Notable people ==
- Frode Estil (born 1972 in Lierne), a retired cross-country skier who won two golds and a silver medal at the 2002 Winter Olympics and a silver medal in the 2006 Winter Olympics
