= Mebygda =

Village in Lierne Municipality, Norway

Mebygda Sørli
- Village
- Interactive map of Mebygda
- Location within Trøndelag Location within Norway
- Coordinates: 64.2246°N 13.8308°E
- Country: Norway
- Region: Central Norway
- County: Trøndelag
- District: Namdalen
- Municipality: Lierne Municipality
- Elevation: 369 m (1,211 ft)
- Time zone: UTC+01:00 (CET)
  - Summer (DST): UTC+02:00 (CEST)
- Post Code: 7884 Sørli

Mebygda is a village in Lierne Municipality in Trøndelag county, Norway. The village is located on the southeast shore of the lake Lenglingen. It is located only 15 kilometres (9.3 mi) west of the border with Sweden and about 30 kilometres (19 mi) southeast of the municipal centre of Sandvika. The village was the administrative centre of the old Sørli Municipality which existed from 1915 until its dissolution in 1964. And is currently the inofficial centre of Lierne's southern district, ecompassing the local kindergarten, school (1st to 10th grade), grocery store and post office. Mebygda lies 5 km east of the village Devika, where the Sørli church is located.

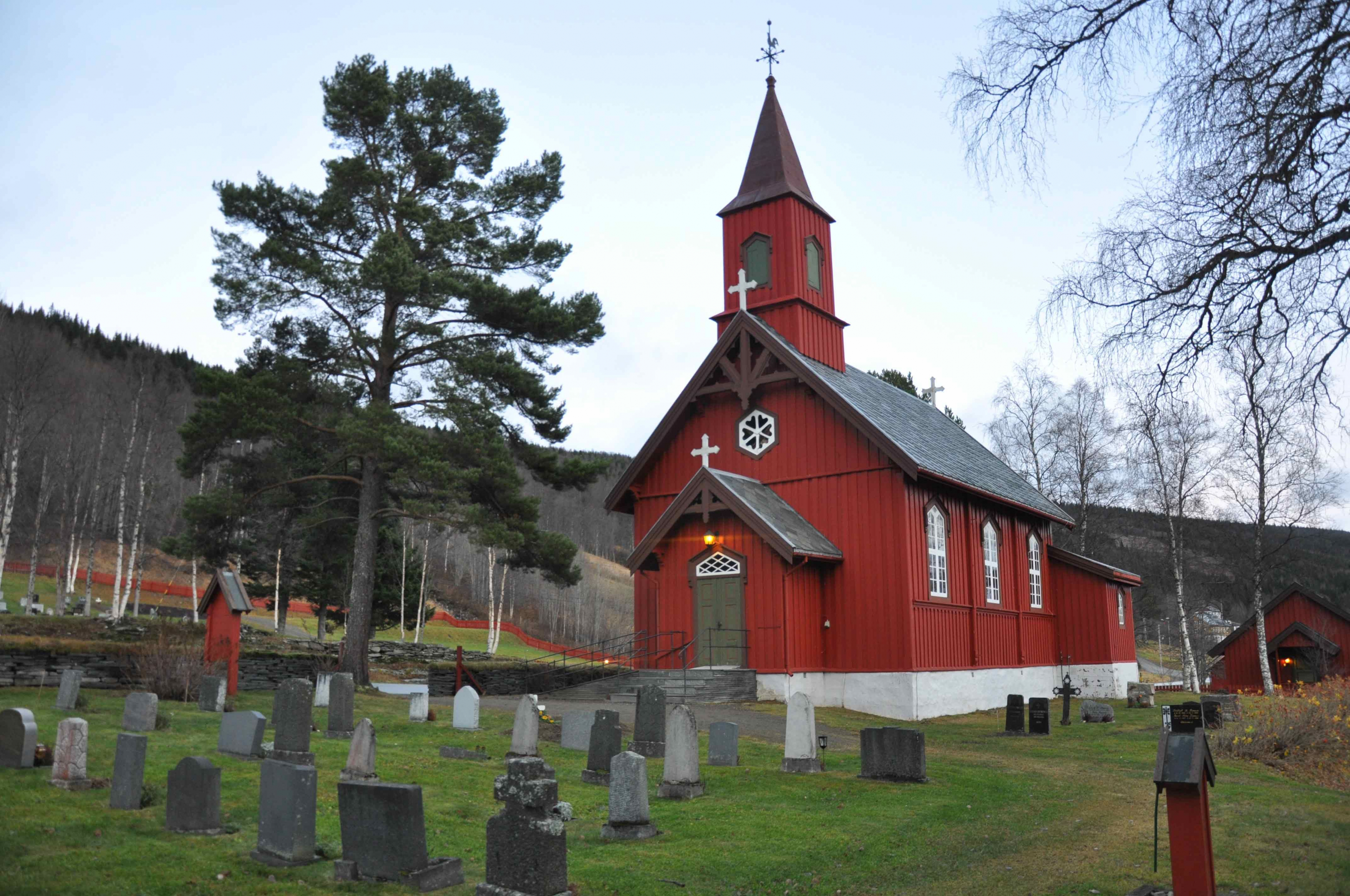
Sørli Church
