= Tunnsjø senter =

Village in Lierne Municipality, Norway

Tunnsjø senter Tunnsjøsenter
- Village
- Interactive map of Tunnsjø senter
- Location within Trøndelag Location within Norway
- Coordinates: 64.6443°N 13.7001°E
- Country: Norway
- Region: Central Norway
- County: Trøndelag
- District: Namdalen
- Municipality: Lierne Municipality
- Elevation: 319 m (1,047 ft)
- Time zone: UTC+01:00 (CET)
  - Summer (DST): UTC+02:00 (CEST)
- Post Code: 7882 Nordli

Tunnsjø senter is a village located in the northern part of Lierne Municipality in Trøndelag county, Norway. It is named for its location near the large lake Tunnsjøen. The village sits just 400 metres (1,300 ft) west of the border with Sweden. Tunnsjø Chapel is located in the village.

Tunnsjø senter is the main village area in the far northern part of Lierne Municipality, and it is rather isolated from the rest of the municipality. To drive from this part of the municipality to the rest of Lierne, one would need to drive south about 10 kilometres (6.2 mi) through Sweden and back into Norway.

The village sits very close to several large lakes: Limingen and Tunnsjøen to the north, Ingelsvatnet to the west, and Kvarnbergsvattnet to the east (in Sweden).
