= Sandvika, Lierne =

Village in Lierne Municipality, Norway

Sandvika
- Village
- Interactive map of Sandvika
- Location within Trøndelag Location within Norway
- Coordinates: 64.4638°N 13.5913°E
- Country: Norway
- Region: Central Norway
- County: Trøndelag
- District: Namdalen
- Municipality: Lierne Municipality

Area
  - Total: 0.39 km^{2} (0.15 sq mi)
- Elevation: 404 m (1,325 ft)

Population (2024)
  - Total: 220
  - Density: 564/km^{2} (1,460/sq mi)
- Time zone: UTC+01:00 (CET)
  - Summer (DST): UTC+02:00 (CEST)
- Post Code: 7882 Nordli

Sandvika is the administrative centre of Lierne Municipality in Trøndelag county, Norway. The village lies on the northeastern shore of the lake Laksjøen, about 8 kilometres (5.0 mi) west of the village of Holand. The main church for northern Lierne, Nordli Church, is located on the northern edge of Sandvika.

The 0.39-square-kilometre (96-acre) village has a population (2024) of 220 and a population density of 564 inhabitants per square kilometre (1,460/sq mi).
