= Værnes (disambiguation) =

Værnes may refer to:

== Places ==
- Værnes, Trøndelag, an area in Stjørdal Municipality in Trøndelag county, Norway
  - Trondheim Airport, Værnes, an international airport located at Værnes in Stjørdal Municipality in Trøndelag county, Norway
  - Værnes Air Station, a Royal Norwegian Air Force station in Stjørdal Municipality in Trøndelag county, Norway
  - Trondheim Airport Station, also called Værnes Station, a railway station
  - Værnes Church, a church in the village of Prestmoen in Stjørdal Municipality in Trøndelag county, Norway
- Agdenes Municipality, a former municipality in Trøndelag county that was known as Værnes Municipality from 1896 to 1897

== People ==
- Knut Værnes (born 1954), a Norwegian musician
- Morten Værnes (born 1981), a Norwegian paralympic ice sledge hockey player
