= Værnes, Trøndelag =

Village in Stjørdal Municipality, Norway

Værnes
- Village
- Interactive map of Værnes
- Location within Trøndelag Location within Norway
- Coordinates: 63.4546°N 10.9459°E
- Country: Norway
- Region: Central Norway
- County: Trøndelag
- District: Stjørdalen
- Municipality: Stjørdal Municipality
- Elevation: 20 m (66 ft)
- Time zone: UTC+01:00 (CET)
  - Summer (DST): UTC+02:00 (CEST)
- Post Code: 7500 Stjørdal

Værnes is a village in Stjørdal Municipality in Trøndelag county, Norway. It is located in the western part of the municipality, about 3 kilometres (1.9 mi) southeast of the town of Stjørdalshalsen and just northeast of the Stjørdalselva river delta. The village of Hell lies to the south and the village of Prestmoen lies to the east.

The area is the site of Trondheim Airport, Værnes, Trondheim Airport Station, Værnes Air Station, and the 12th-century Værnes Church.
