= Amble (disambiguation) =

Amble is a coastal town on the North Sea coast in Northumberland, England.

Amble may also refer to:

- Amble, an unincorporated community in Winfield Township, Michigan, US
- River Amble, Cornwall, England, a tributary of the River Camel
- Alf Amble (1909–1950), Norwegian anti-Semitic activist and writer
- Lars Amble (1939–2015), Swedish actor and director
- Michele Bachmann (born 1956 as Michele Amble), American politician
- Ambling gait or amble, any of a number of gaits for horses
- Amble (band), Irish folk band
