= Håvard Alstadheim =

Norwegian economist and politician

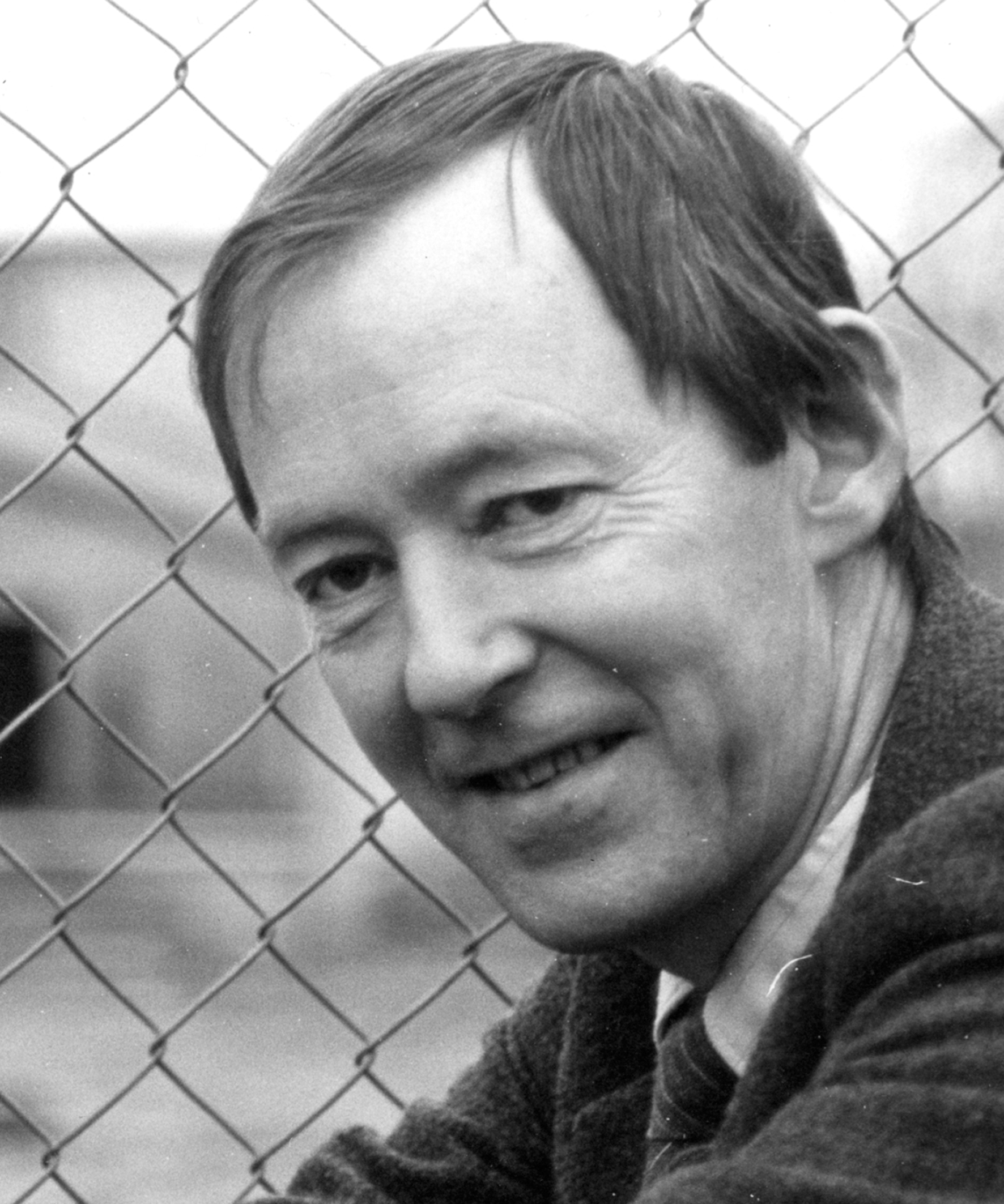

Leader of the Liberal Party
- In office 29 April 1990 – 15 March 1992
- Preceded by: Arne Fjørtoft
- Succeeded by: Odd Einar Dørum

Lt. Governor of Nord-Trøndelag
- In office 1 January 1988 – 31 December 1991
- Governor: Ola H. Kveli
- Preceded by: Jon Åby
- Succeeded by: Osvald Løberg

First Deputy Leader of the Liberal Party
- In office 4 May 1986 – 29 April 1990
- Preceded by: Eldbjørg Løwer
- Succeeded by: Anne Mo Grimdalen

Deputy Mayor of Stjørdal Municipality
- In office 1 January 1986 – 31 December 1987
- Preceded by: Alf Daniel Moen
- Succeeded by: Einar Wollebæk Andersen

Mayor of Stjørdal Municipality
- In office 1 January 1980 – 31 December 1985
- Preceded by: Kaare J. Forø
- Succeeded by: Alf Daniel Moen

State Secretary in the Ministry of Finance
- In office 27 October 1972 – 16 October 1973
- Prime Minister: Lars Korvald
- Minister: Jon Ola Norbom

Personal details
- Born: 24 May 1936 Skatval, Norway
- Died: 7 September 1998 (aged 62) Trondheim, Norway
- Party: Liberal Party
- Spouse: Karen Kristine Richter (1962–1998; his death)
- Children: 3, including Håkon Alstadheim

Håvard Alstadheim (24 May 1936 – 7 September 1998) was a Norwegian economist and politician for the Liberal Party.

He was born in Stjørdal Municipality, and took the cand.oecon. degree. He was appointed as a docent in economics at the University of Trondheim in 1975, and was promoted to professor. He retired in 1993 to become director of agriculture in Sør-Trøndelag County Municipality.

He was a State Secretary in the Ministry of Finance from 1972 to 1973, during Korvald's Cabinet. He was the mayor of Stjørdal from 1980 to 1985, then deputy mayor from 1986 to 1987 before serving as deputy county mayor of Nord-Trøndelag from 1988 to 1991. He chaired his party from 1990 to 1992, after having been deputy leader from 1986 to 1990. He was a candidate for the Parliament of Norway numerous times without being elected; in 1965 (fifth candidate in Oslo), 1977 (seventh candidate, Nord-Trøndelag) and 1985 (third candidate, Nord-Trøndelag).

Party political offices
Preceded by Arne Fjørtoft	Chairman of the Norwegian Liberal Party; 1990–1992	Succeeded by Odd Einar Dørum
