= Reidar Kvaal =

Norwegian military officer (1916–2016)

Reidar Kvaal MC
- Born: 14 February 1916; Stjørdal Municipality, Norway
- Died: 17 June 2016 (aged 100)
- Occupation: Army officer
- Awards: St. Olav's Medal with Oak Branch; Military Cross; Order of St. Olav

Reidar Kvaal MC (14 February 1916 – 17 June 2016) was a Norwegian military officer.

== Life and career ==
Kvaal was born in Stjørdal Municipality on 14 February 1916, to farmer Ottar Kvaal and Guri Gjære. He married Ivy Hunter Gordon in 1947.

During World War II he was a member of Kompani Linge. He led Operation Lapwing, a group of commandos who were paradropped in the mountains of Haltdalen Municipality in 1943 and operated within occupied territory.

He was decorated with the St. Olav's Medal with Oak Branch and the British Military Cross. He ended his military career as Lieutenant General in the Norwegian Army. He was decorated Commander of the Order of St. Olav in 1972.

Kvaal died on 17 June 2016, at the age of 100.
