= Stjørdal Municipality =

Municipality in Trøndelag, Norway

Stjørdal Municipality Stjørdal kommune Skierde (Southern Sami)
- Municipality
- Stjørdalen herred (historic name)
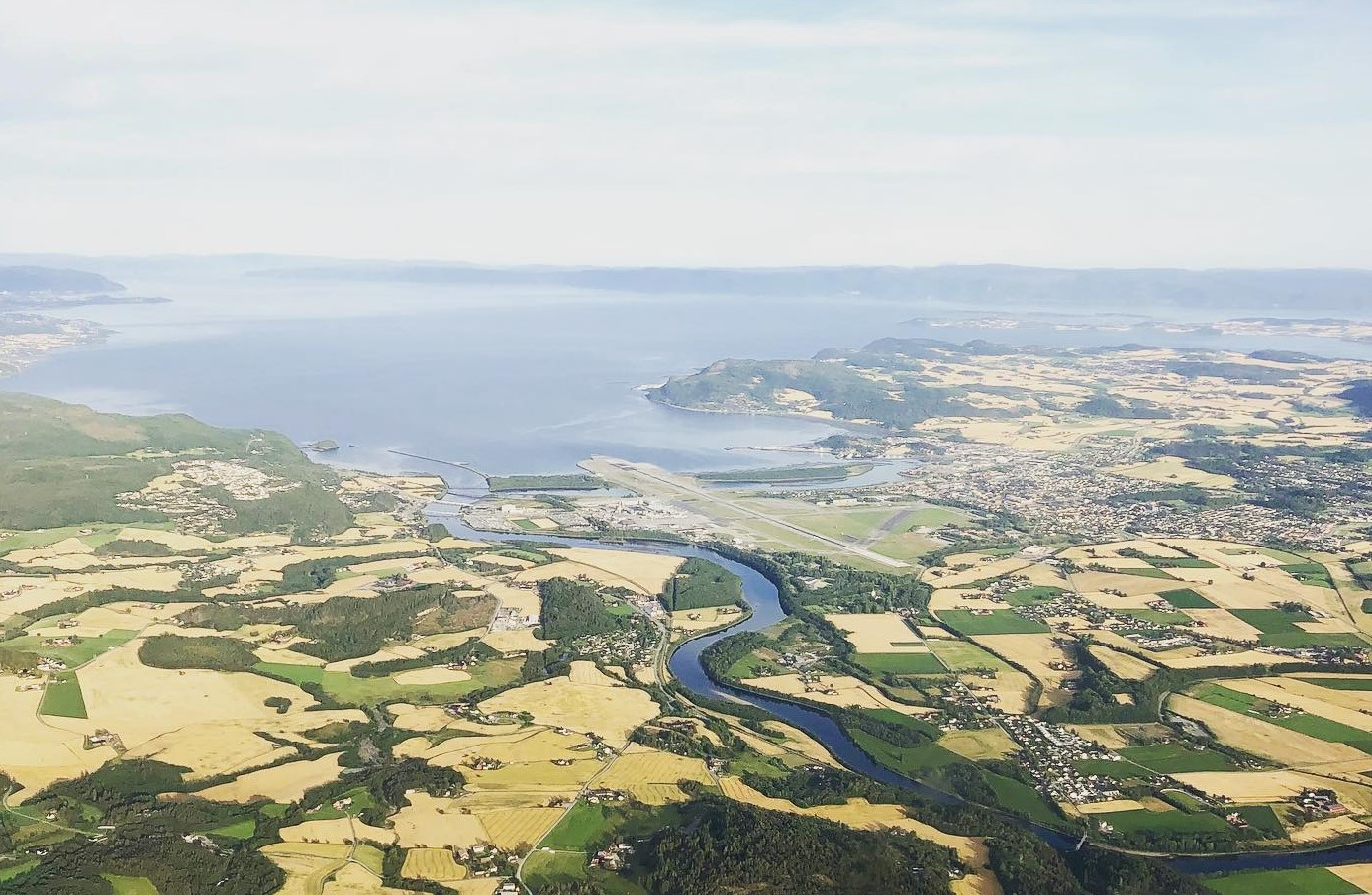
- Aerial view of Stjørdal from the east

- Flag Coat of arms

- Trøndelag within Norway

- Stjørdal within Trøndelag
- Coordinates: 63°28′30″N 11°10′15″E
- Country: Norway
- County: Trøndelag
- District: Stjørdalen
- Established: 1 Jan 1902
  - Preceded by: Nedre Stjørdalen Municipality
- Administrative centre: Stjørdalshalsen

Government
  - Mayor (2023): Eli Arnstad (Sp)

Area
  - Total: 938.27 km^{2} (362.27 sq mi)
  - Land: 913.44 km^{2} (352.68 sq mi)
  - Water: 24.83 km^{2} (9.59 sq mi) 2.6%
  - Rank: #125 in Norway
- Highest elevation: 1,171.31 m (3,842.9 ft)

Population (2024)
  - Total: 24,927
  - Rank: #51 in Norway
  - Density: 26.3/km^{2} (68/sq mi)
  - Change (10 years): ▲ +9%
- Demonym: Stjørdaling

Official language
  - Norwegian form: Neutral
- Time zone: UTC+01:00 (CET)
  - Summer (DST): UTC+02:00 (CEST)
- ISO 3166 code: NO-5035
- Website: Official website

Stjørdal (Southern Sami: Skierde) is a municipality in Trøndelag county, Norway. It is part of the Stjørdalen region. The administrative centre of the municipality is the town of Stjørdal (also called Stjørdalshalsen). Some of the villages in the municipality include Elvran, Flornes, Hegra, Hell, Kvithammer, Prestmoen, Skatval, Skjelstadmarka, Sona, and Værnes.

The 938-square-kilometre (362 sq mi) municipality is the 125th largest by area out of the 357 municipalities in Norway. Stjørdal Municipality is the 51st most populous municipality in Norway with a population of 24,717. The municipality's population density is 26.3 inhabitants per square kilometre (68/sq mi) and its population has increased by 9% over the previous 10-year period.

The municipality is well-known for the village of Hell which is located south of Stjørdalshalsen. Hell is especially known for its train station, Hell Station, where you find the old sign saying Gods-expedition (meaning "Cargo handling").

In 1997, the municipal council declared Stjørdalshalsen to have town status. Stjørdal is one of the fastest-growing municipalities in Trøndelag due to its proximity to the city of Trondheim and also to Statoil's presence (it controls a large part of the petroleum activity in the Norwegian Sea from Stjørdal).

== General information ==
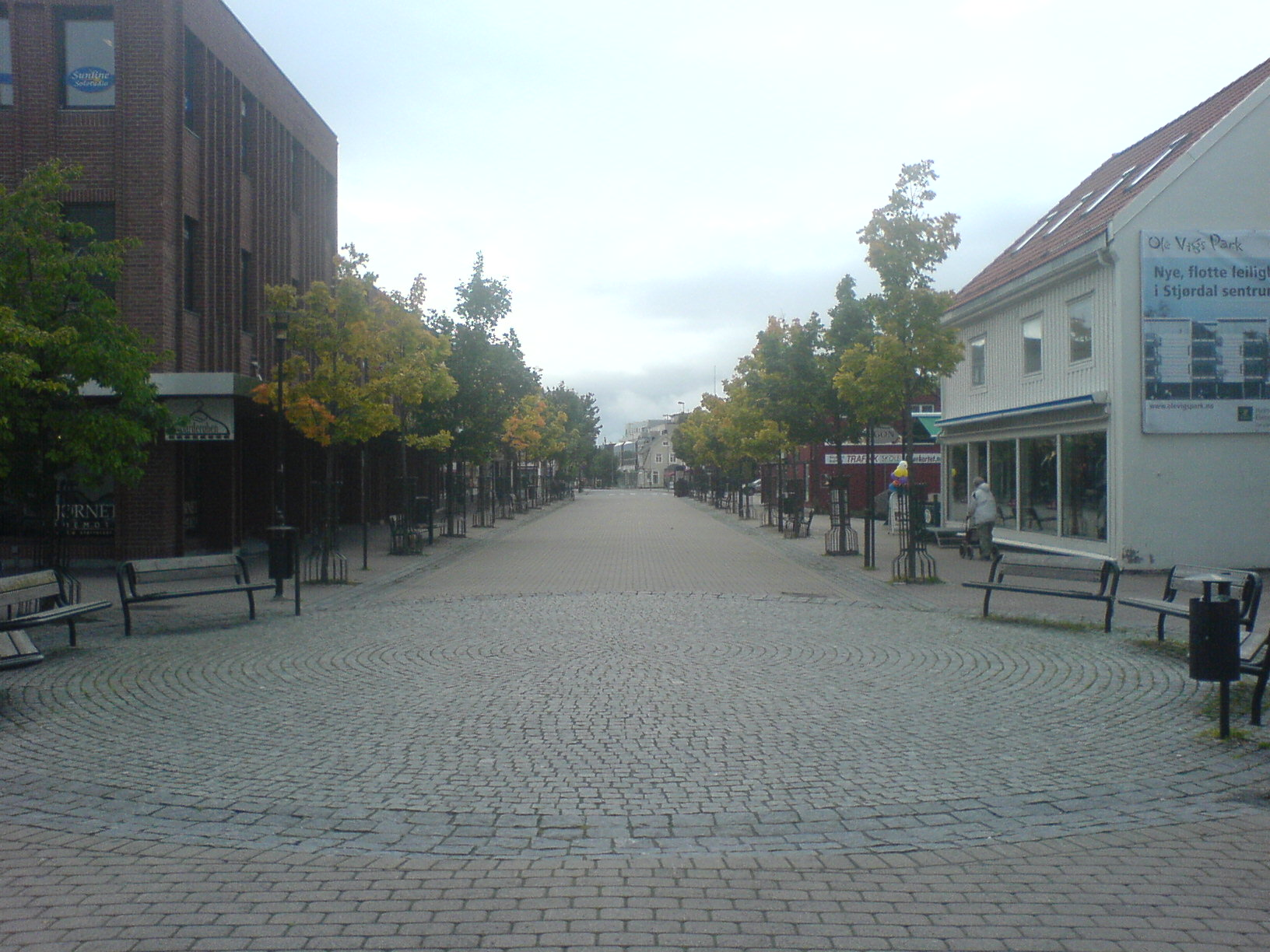
Pedestrian street in Stjørdal town

The old prestegjeld of Stjørdalen was established as Stjørdalen Municipality on 1 January 1838 (see formannskapsdistrikt law). On 1 January 1850, Stjørdalen Municipality was divided into two new municipalities: Øvre Stjørdalen Municipality (population: 5,199) in the east and Nedre Stjørdalen Municipality (population: 6,543) in the west. Later, on 1 January 1874, Øvre Stjørdalen Municipality was divided into two new municipalities: Hegra Municipality (population: 3,409) in the west and Meråker Municipality (population: 1,861) in the east.

The present-day Stjørdal Municipality was established on 1 January 1902 when the old Nedre Stjørdalen Municipality was divided into three new municipalities: Lånke Municipality (population: 1,449) in the south, Skatval Municipality (population: 2,125) in the north, and Stjørdal Municipality (population: 3,158) in the central part. Originally, Stjørdal Municipality was quite small in comparison to its size today, but over time it was expanded.

During the 1960s, there were many municipal mergers across Norway due to the work of the Schei Committee. On 1 January 1962, Stjørdal Municipality (population: 6,204) was merged with three neighbors: Hegra Municipality (population: 2,704), Lånke Municipality (population: 1,967), and Skatval Municipality (population: 1,944) to form a much larger Stjørdal Municipality.

On 1 January 2018, the municipality switched from the old Nord-Trøndelag county to the new Trøndelag county.

=== Name ===
The municipality (originally the parish) is named after the Stjørdalen valley (Old Norse: Stjórardalr). The first element is the genitive case of the local river name Stjór (now called the Stjørdalselva river). The meaning of the river name is unknown. The last element is dalr which means "valley" or "dale". Historically, the name of the municipality was spelled Stjørdalen. On 3 November 1917, a royal resolution changed the spelling of the name of the municipality to Stjørdal. The pronunciation of the name Stjørdal in the local dialect is [ʃøɽdaɽːɲ].

=== Coat of arms and flag ===
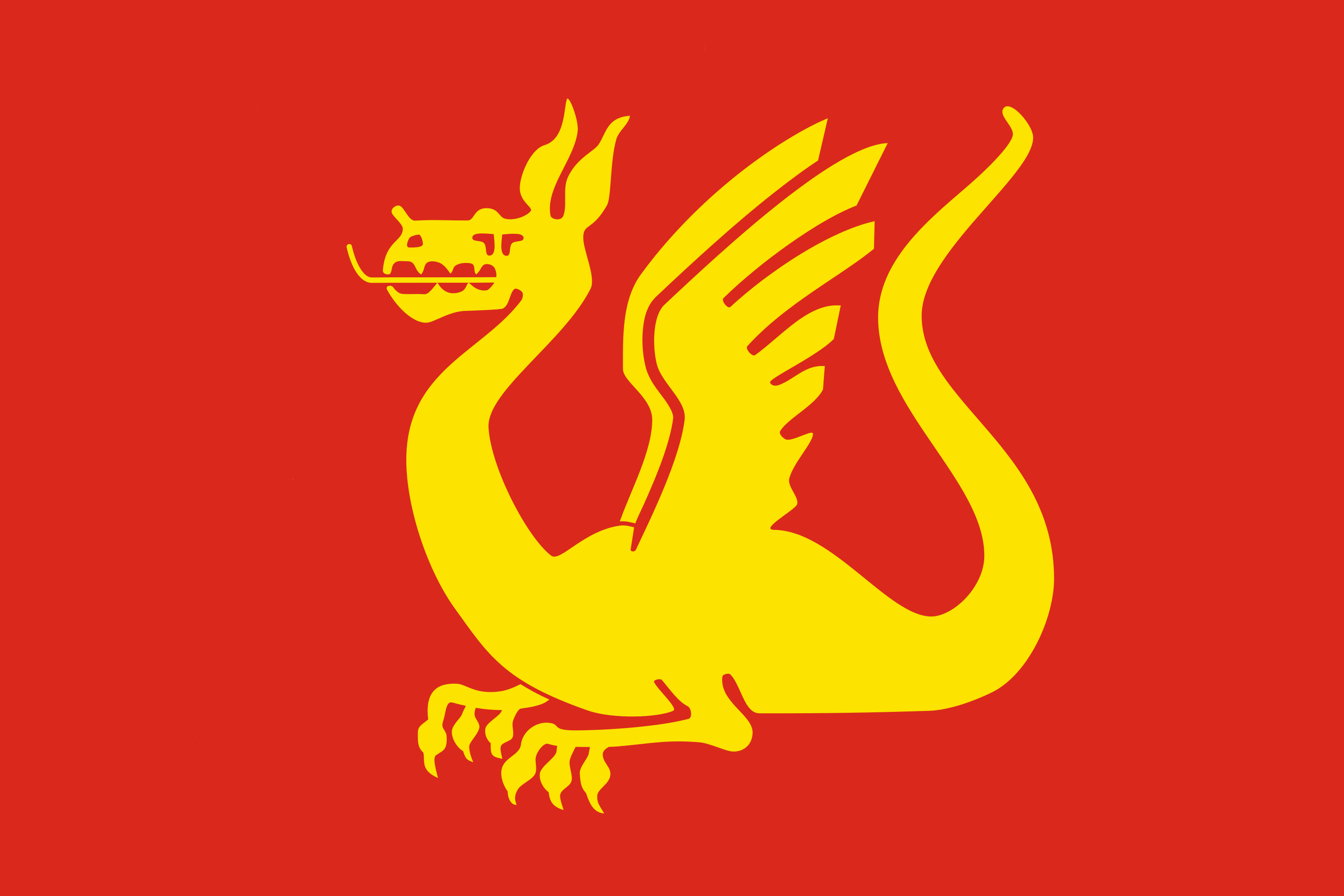
Flag of Stjørdal

On 29 September 1983, by resolution of its municipal council, Stjørdal adopted a new municipal coat of arms in red and gold, bearing a gold or yellow Lindworm (a two-legged dragon or wyvern) on a field of red. The arms were granted on 25 November 1983.

The official blazon is "Gules, a lindworm couchant Or" (Norwegian: I rødt en liggende gull lindorm). This means the arms have a red field (background) and the charge is a lindworm with two legs and two wings (also known as a wyvern. The charge has a tincture of Or which means it is commonly colored yellow, but if it is made out of metal, then gold is used. The arms were designed by Hallvard Trætteberg. Most Norwegian municipalities have a banner of their respective coats of arms as a flag, and accordingly, the municipal flag of Stjørdal similarly bears a yellow wyvern on a red field.

Although the coat of arms is from modern times, the dragon motif of the arms was inspired by a medieval seal for the district, dating from 1344. The old municipal seal was considered unsuitable for selection as the municipal coat of arms, because to obtain a municipal coat of arms and flag, a Norwegian municipality must fulfill certain heraldic requirements that do not apply to a seal. For example, a coat of arms will generally contain only one pictorial motif, while Stjørdal's seal had three motifs and failed to meet additional requirements concerning color elements. The municipality sought assistance from the National Archives of Norway, and was referred to archivist Hallvard Trætteberg, resulting in a collaboration to develop the new coat of arms.

The dragon is a symbol of Saint Margaret of Antioch, and its depiction is derived from Stjørdal's old seal, which showed Saint Margaret standing on a slain dragon. According to Stjørdal's municipal website, both the four-legged dragon and the two-legged wyvern are used in ancient designs of arms going back thousands of years, and have "always stood as a symbol of authority, power, and exalted dignity of great national cultures."

=== Churches ===
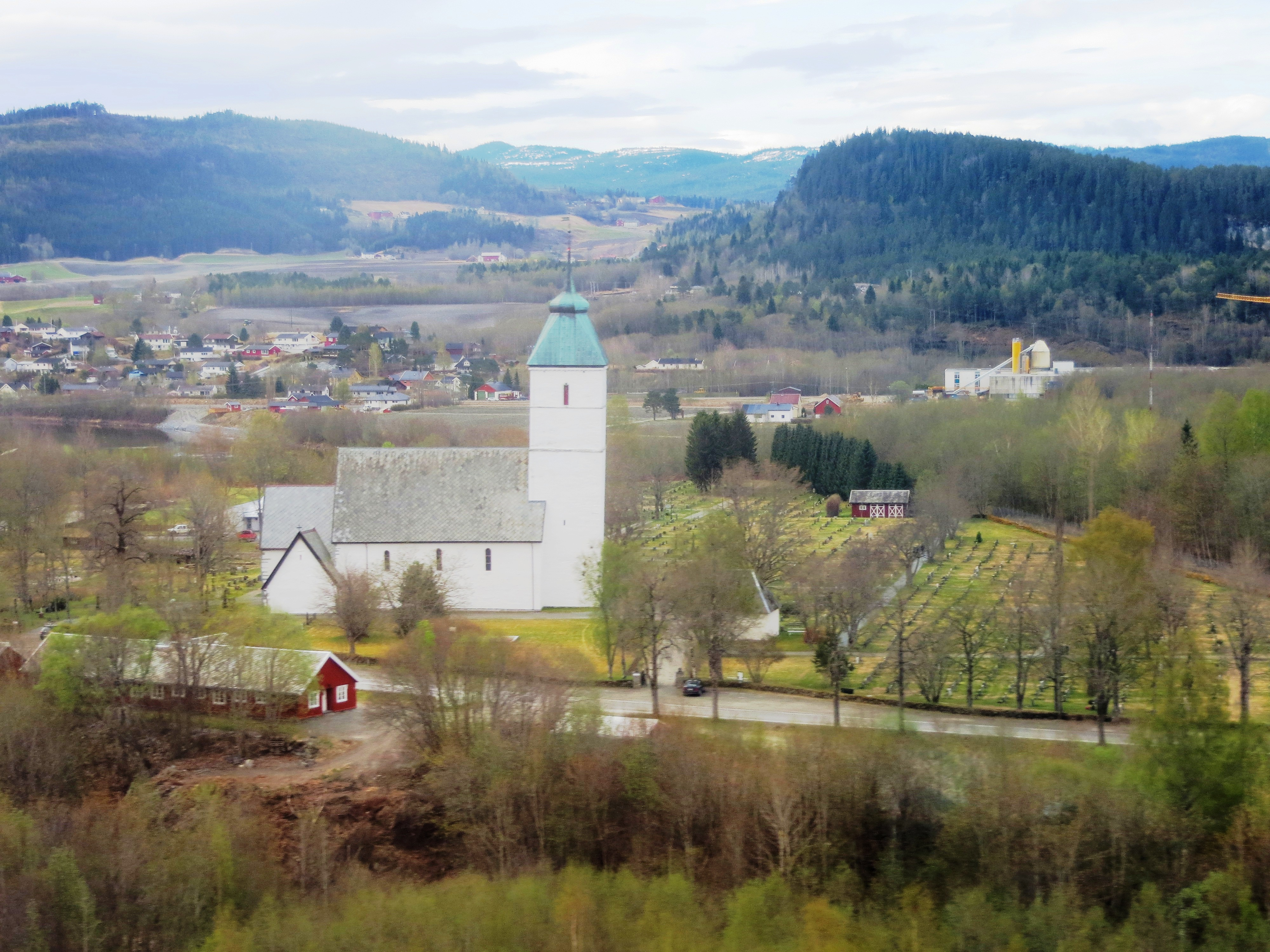
Værnes church from north

The Church of Norway has four parishes (sokn) within Stjørdal Municipality. It is part of the Stjørdal prosti (deanery) in the Diocese of Nidaros.

Churches in Stjørdal Municipality
Parish (sokn)	Church name	Location of church	Year built
Hegra	Hegra Church	Hegra	1783
Hegra	Floren Chapel	Flornes	1936
Hegra	Okkelberg Chapel	Skjelstadmarka	1905
Lånke	Lånke Church	Hell	1899
Lånke	Elvran Chapel	Elvran	1893
Skatval	Skatval Church	Skatval	1901
Stjørdal	Værnes Church	Prestmoen	1100
Stjørdal	Stjørdal Church	Stjørdal	2015

== History ==
Historical population
Year	Pop.	±%
1951	5,105	—
1960	6,128	+20.0%
1970	13,545	+121.0%
1980	16,107	+18.9%
1990	17,276	+7.3%
2000	18,238	+5.6%
2010	21,375	+17.2%
2018	23,964	+12.1%
Source: Statistics Norway.

The Leirfall rock carvings is one of the largest collections of petroglyphs in the Nordic region, with a total of approximately 900 figures.

Stjørdal is the location of Steinvikholm Castle, the residence of Norway's last Catholic archbishop, Olav Engelbrektsson. It is located on the Skatval peninsula.

Hegra Fortress is located in the central part of the municipality. It was used as a defense against the Swedish military. It was also used during World War II in the Battle of Hegra Fortress.

The Stjørdal Folk Academy was founded in 1908 by Nils Anton Vaagland, who was later mayor of Stjørdal and also served as the academy's director for 10 years.

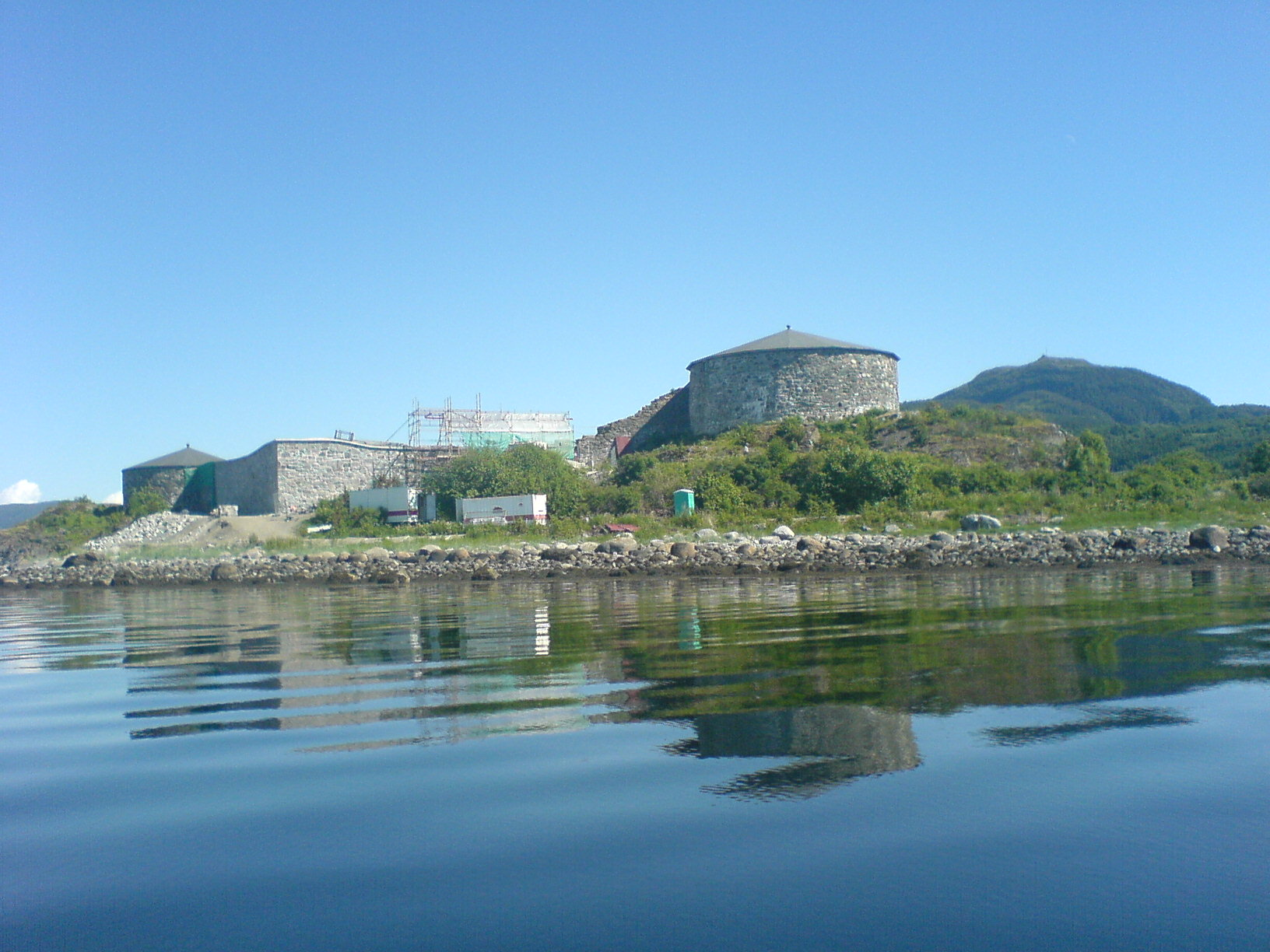
Steinvikholm Castle in Stjørdal where the last archbishop of Norway resided

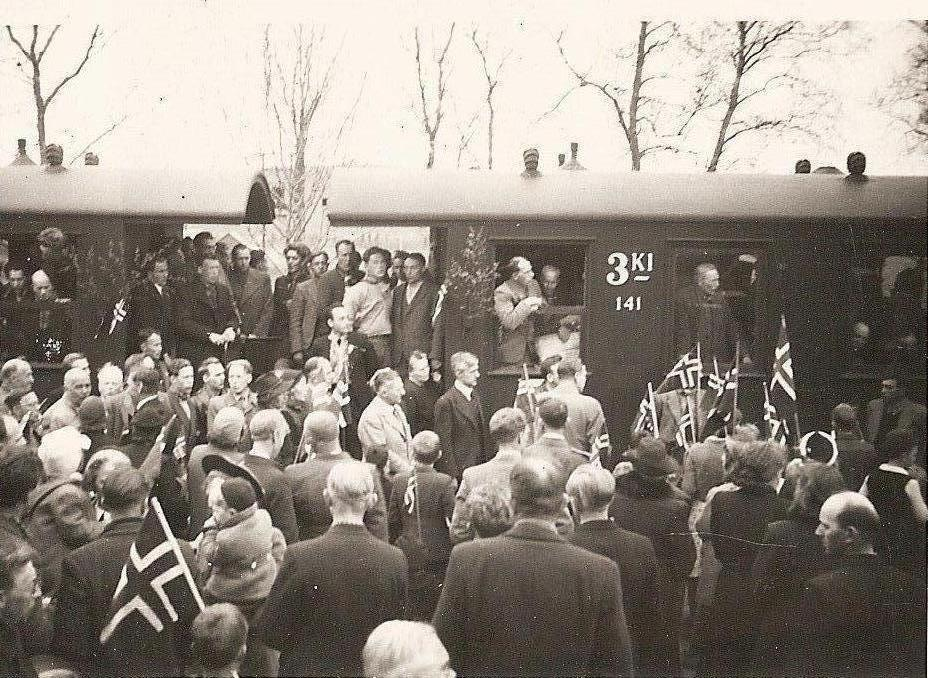
8 May 1945 following years of German occupation

== Government ==
Stjørdal Municipality is responsible for primary education (through 10th grade), outpatient health services, senior citizen services, welfare and other social services, zoning, economic development, and municipal roads and utilities. The municipality is governed by a municipal council of directly elected representatives. The mayor is indirectly elected by a vote of the municipal council. The municipality is under the jurisdiction of the Trøndelag District Court and the Frostating Court of Appeal. Waste management has since 1998 been provided by the intermunicipal agency Innherred Renovasjon, and waste collection has been operated by ReTrans Midt since 2018.

=== Municipal council ===
The municipal council (Kommunestyre) of Stjørdal Municipality is made up of 37 representatives that are elected to four year terms. The tables below show the current and historical composition of the council by political party.

Stjørdal kommunestyre 2023–2027
Party name (in Norwegian)	Number of representatives
Labour Party (Arbeiderpartiet)	9
Progress Party (Fremskrittspartiet)	3
Green Party (Miljøpartiet De Grønne)	1
Conservative Party (Høyre)	5
Industry and Business Party (Industri‑ og Næringspartiet)	1
Christian Democratic Party (Kristelig Folkeparti)	1
Pensioners' Party (Pensjonistpartiet)	1
Red Party (Rødt)	1
Centre Party (Senterpartiet)	12
Socialist Left Party (Sosialistisk Venstreparti)	2
Liberal Party (Venstre)	1
Total number of members:	37

Stjørdal kommunestyre 2019–2023
Party name (in Norwegian)	Number of representatives
Labour Party (Arbeiderpartiet)	11
Progress Party (Fremskrittspartiet)	2
Green Party (Miljøpartiet De Grønne)	2
Conservative Party (Høyre)	4
Christian Democratic Party (Kristelig Folkeparti)	1
Red Party (Rødt)	2
Centre Party (Senterpartiet)	16
Socialist Left Party (Sosialistisk Venstreparti)	2
Liberal Party (Venstre)	1
Total number of members:	41

Stjørdal kommunestyre 2015–2019
Party name (in Norwegian)	Number of representatives
Labour Party (Arbeiderpartiet)	16
Progress Party (Fremskrittspartiet)	2
Green Party (Miljøpartiet De Grønne)	1
Conservative Party (Høyre)	6
Christian Democratic Party (Kristelig Folkeparti)	1
Red Party (Rødt)	1
Centre Party (Senterpartiet)	11
Socialist Left Party (Sosialistisk Venstreparti)	1
Liberal Party (Venstre)	2
Total number of members:	41

Stjørdal kommunestyre 2011–2015
Party name (in Norwegian)	Number of representatives
Labour Party (Arbeiderpartiet)	18
Progress Party (Fremskrittspartiet)	3
Conservative Party (Høyre)	7
Christian Democratic Party (Kristelig Folkeparti)	2
Centre Party (Senterpartiet)	7
Socialist Left Party (Sosialistisk Venstreparti)	2
Liberal Party (Venstre)	2
Total number of members:	41

Stjørdal kommunestyre 2007–2011
Party name (in Norwegian)	Number of representatives
Labour Party (Arbeiderpartiet)	14
Progress Party (Fremskrittspartiet)	6
Green Party (Miljøpartiet De Grønne)	1
Conservative Party (Høyre)	4
Christian Democratic Party (Kristelig Folkeparti)	2
Centre Party (Senterpartiet)	10
Socialist Left Party (Sosialistisk Venstreparti)	2
Liberal Party (Venstre)	2
Total number of members:	41

Stjørdal kommunestyre 2003–2007
Party name (in Norwegian)	Number of representatives
Labour Party (Arbeiderpartiet)	19
Progress Party (Fremskrittspartiet)	5
Conservative Party (Høyre)	6
Christian Democratic Party (Kristelig Folkeparti)	3
Centre Party (Senterpartiet)	10
Socialist Left Party (Sosialistisk Venstreparti)	6
Liberal Party (Venstre)	2
Total number of members:	51

Stjørdal kommunestyre 1999–2003
Party name (in Norwegian)	Number of representatives
Labour Party (Arbeiderpartiet)	20
Progress Party (Fremskrittspartiet)	4
Conservative Party (Høyre)	8
Christian Democratic Party (Kristelig Folkeparti)	4
Centre Party (Senterpartiet)	9
Socialist Left Party (Sosialistisk Venstreparti)	4
Liberal Party (Venstre)	2
Total number of members:	51

Stjørdal kommunestyre 1995–1999
Party name (in Norwegian)	Number of representatives
Labour Party (Arbeiderpartiet)	20
Progress Party (Fremskrittspartiet)	2
Conservative Party (Høyre)	8
Christian Democratic Party (Kristelig Folkeparti)	3
Centre Party (Senterpartiet)	11
Socialist Left Party (Sosialistisk Venstreparti)	3
Liberal Party (Venstre)	4
Total number of members:	51

Stjørdal kommunestyre 1991–1995
Party name (in Norwegian)	Number of representatives
Labour Party (Arbeiderpartiet)	20
Progress Party (Fremskrittspartiet)	3
Conservative Party (Høyre)	7
Christian Democratic Party (Kristelig Folkeparti)	3
Centre Party (Senterpartiet)	12
Socialist Left Party (Sosialistisk Venstreparti)	6
Liberal Party (Venstre)	2
Total number of members:	53

Stjørdal kommunestyre 1987–1991
Party name (in Norwegian)	Number of representatives
Labour Party (Arbeiderpartiet)	21
Progress Party (Fremskrittspartiet)	5
Conservative Party (Høyre)	7
Christian Democratic Party (Kristelig Folkeparti)	3
Centre Party (Senterpartiet)	9
Socialist Left Party (Sosialistisk Venstreparti)	4
Joint list of the Liberal Party (Venstre) and Liberal People's Party (Liberale Folkepartiet)	4
Total number of members:	53

Stjørdal kommunestyre 1983–1987
Party name (in Norwegian)	Number of representatives
Labour Party (Arbeiderpartiet)	21
Progress Party (Fremskrittspartiet)	2
Conservative Party (Høyre)	8
Christian Democratic Party (Kristelig Folkeparti)	4
Liberal People's Party (Liberale Folkepartiet)	2
Centre Party (Senterpartiet)	9
Socialist Left Party (Sosialistisk Venstreparti)	3
Liberal Party (Venstre)	4
Total number of members:	53

Stjørdal kommunestyre 1979–1983
Party name (in Norwegian)	Number of representatives
Labour Party (Arbeiderpartiet)	22
Conservative Party (Høyre)	8
Christian Democratic Party (Kristelig Folkeparti)	4
New People's Party (Nye Folkepartiet)	3
Centre Party (Senterpartiet)	10
Socialist Left Party (Sosialistisk Venstreparti)	2
Liberal Party (Venstre)	4
Total number of members:	53

Stjørdal kommunestyre 1975–1979
Party name (in Norwegian)	Number of representatives
Labour Party (Arbeiderpartiet)	21
Conservative Party (Høyre)	4
Christian Democratic Party (Kristelig Folkeparti)	5
New People's Party (Nye Folkepartiet)	4
Centre Party (Senterpartiet)	13
Socialist Left Party (Sosialistisk Venstreparti)	3
Liberal Party (Venstre)	3
Total number of members:	53

Stjørdal kommunestyre 1971–1975
Party name (in Norwegian)	Number of representatives
Labour Party (Arbeiderpartiet)	24
Conservative Party (Høyre)	3
Christian Democratic Party (Kristelig Folkeparti)	4
Centre Party (Senterpartiet)	13
Liberal Party (Venstre)	9
Total number of members:	53

Stjørdal kommunestyre 1967–1971
Party name (in Norwegian)	Number of representatives
Labour Party (Arbeiderpartiet)	24
Conservative Party (Høyre)	4
Christian Democratic Party (Kristelig Folkeparti)	4
Centre Party (Senterpartiet)	12
Liberal Party (Venstre)	9
Total number of members:	53

Stjørdal kommunestyre 1963–1967
Party name (in Norwegian)	Number of representatives
Labour Party (Arbeiderpartiet)	24
Conservative Party (Høyre)	4
Christian Democratic Party (Kristelig Folkeparti)	4
Centre Party (Senterpartiet)	13
Liberal Party (Venstre)	8
Total number of members:	53

Stjørdal herredsstyre 1959–1963
Party name (in Norwegian)	Number of representatives
Labour Party (Arbeiderpartiet)	12
Conservative Party (Høyre)	2
Communist Party (Kommunistiske Parti)	1
Christian Democratic Party (Kristelig Folkeparti)	2
Centre Party (Senterpartiet)	5
Liberal Party (Venstre)	4
Local List(s) (Lokale lister)	3
Total number of members:	29

Stjørdal herredsstyre 1955–1959
Party name (in Norwegian)	Number of representatives
Labour Party (Arbeiderpartiet)	14
Conservative Party (Høyre)	5
Communist Party (Kommunistiske Parti)	1
Christian Democratic Party (Kristelig Folkeparti)	4
Farmers' Party (Bondepartiet)	2
Local List(s) (Lokale lister)	3
Total number of members:	29

Stjørdal herredsstyre 1951–1955
Party name (in Norwegian)	Number of representatives
Labour Party (Arbeiderpartiet)	10
Communist Party (Kommunistiske Parti)	2
Christian Democratic Party (Kristelig Folkeparti)	2
Farmers' Party (Bondepartiet)	4
Liberal Party (Venstre)	3
Local List(s) (Lokale lister)	3
Total number of members:	24

Stjørdal herredsstyre 1947–1951
Party name (in Norwegian)	Number of representatives
Labour Party (Arbeiderpartiet)	10
Communist Party (Kommunistiske Parti)	2
Christian Democratic Party (Kristelig Folkeparti)	2
Farmers' Party (Bondepartiet)	4
Liberal Party (Venstre)	3
Local List(s) (Lokale lister)	3
Total number of members:	24

Stjørdal herredsstyre 1945–1947
Party name (in Norwegian)	Number of representatives
Labour Party (Arbeiderpartiet)	10
Communist Party (Kommunistiske Parti)	2
Christian Democratic Party (Kristelig Folkeparti)	3
Farmers' Party (Bondepartiet)	4
Liberal Party (Venstre)	3
Local List(s) (Lokale lister)	2
Total number of members:	24

Stjørdal herredsstyre 1937–1941*
Party name (in Norwegian)	Number of representatives
Labour Party (Arbeiderpartiet)	10
Farmers' Party (Bondepartiet)	6
Liberal Party (Venstre)	4
Local List(s) (Lokale lister)	4
Total number of members:	24
Note: Due to the German occupation of Norway during World War II, no elections were held for new municipal councils until after the war ended in 1945.

=== Mayors ===
The mayor (Norwegian: ordfører) of Stjørdal Municipality is the political leader of the municipality and the chairperson of the municipal council. Here is a list of people who have held this position:

- 1902–1907: Bernhard Øverland (V)
- 1908–1910: Peter Andreas Hofstad (V)
- 1911–1925: Nils M. Vaagland (V)
- 1926–1934: Marius Stokke (Bp)
- 1935–1937: Gustav Johnsen (V)
- 1938–1941: Peder Bjerve (V)
- 1941–1942: Agnar Nordback (NS)
- 1942–1944: Reidar Foss (NS)
- 1944–1945: Arnt Hegstad (NS)
- 1945–1945: Peder Bjerve (V)
- 1946–1951: Arne Holtesmo (Ap)
- 1952–1955: Johan A. Vikan (Bp)
- 1956–1959: Joar Eimhjellen (Ap)
- 1960–1966: Johan A. Vikan (Sp)
- 1966–1967: Lars Bidtnes (V)
- 1968–1975: Karl Eidsvik (Sp)
- 1976–1979: Kaare J. Forø (V/DNF)
- 1980–1985: Håvard Alstadheim (V)
- 1986–1993: Alf Daniel Moen (Ap)
- 1994–1995: Einar Wollebæk Andersen (H)
- 1995–1999: Alf Daniel Moen (Ap)
- 1999–2013: Johan Arnt Elverum (Sp)
- 2013–2022: Ivar Vigdenes (Sp)
- 2022–present: Eli Arnstad (Sp)

== Geography ==
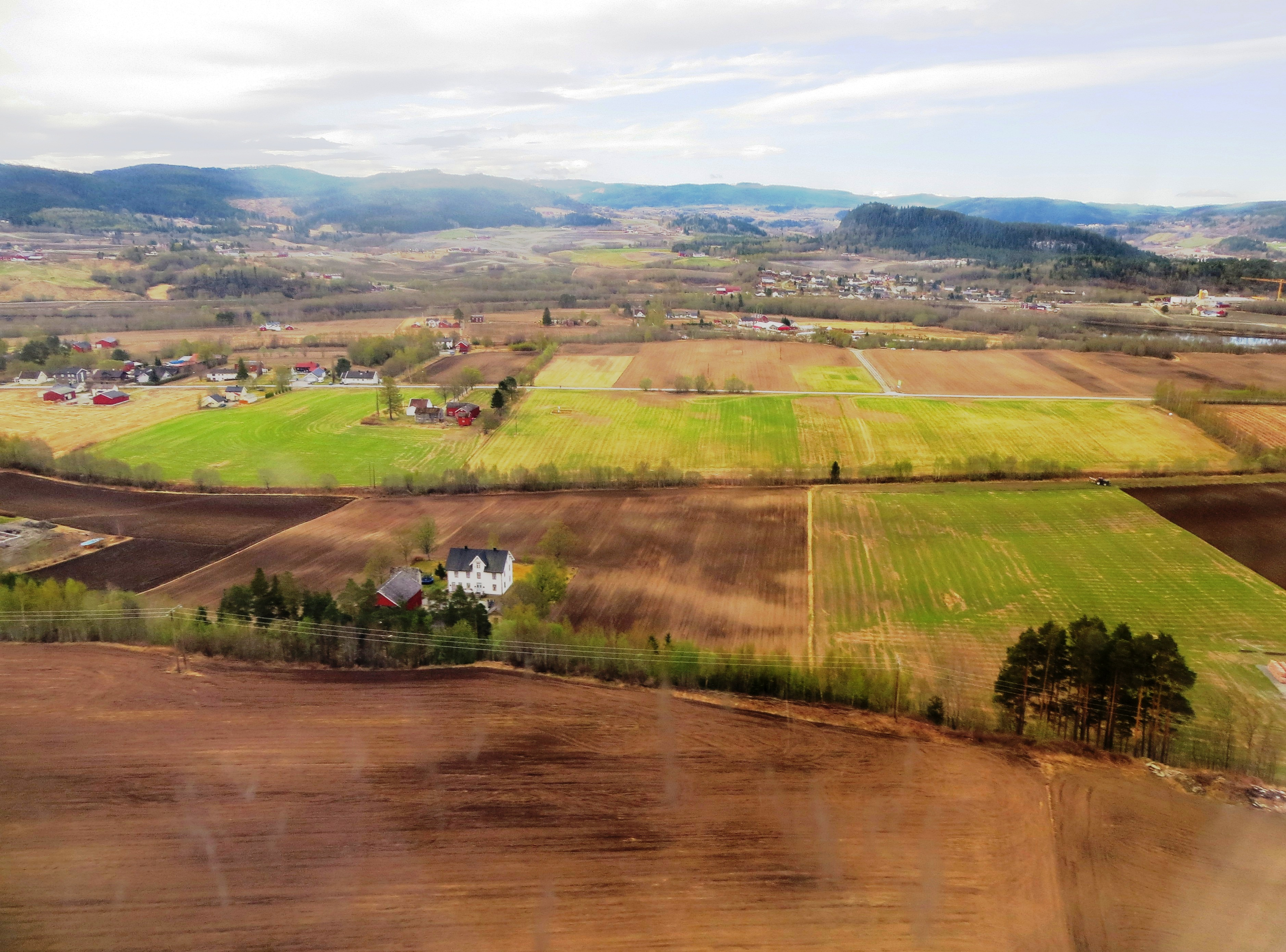
Part of Stjørdal valley in mid-May

Stjørdal Municipality consists of the lands from the old Skatval Municipality, Hegra Municipality, and Lånke Municipality. The Stjørdalselva river runs through the Stjørdalen valley, with the Skatval peninsula on the northern side. The Forbordsfjellet mountain sits in the northern part of the municipality. The Skarvan and Roltdalen National Park lies in the eastern part of the municipality, as is a tiny part of the lake Feren. The highest point in the municipality is the 1,171.31-metre (3,842.9 ft) tall mountain Storskarven, a tripoint border with Stjørdal Municipality, Meråker Municipality, and Selbu Municipality.

Trondheim Municipality is only about 32 kilometres (20 miles) from Stjørdal either by road (European route E6) or train (Trønderbanen). Stjørdal is in the process of "growing together" with Trondheim, a show of regional urbanization. The distance to Steinkjer is about 90 km (56 mi), and the towns of Levanger and Verdalsøra are both about 48 to 60 km (30 to 37 mi) to the north. All four of these towns are located on the eastern shore of Trondheimsfjord.

=== Climate ===
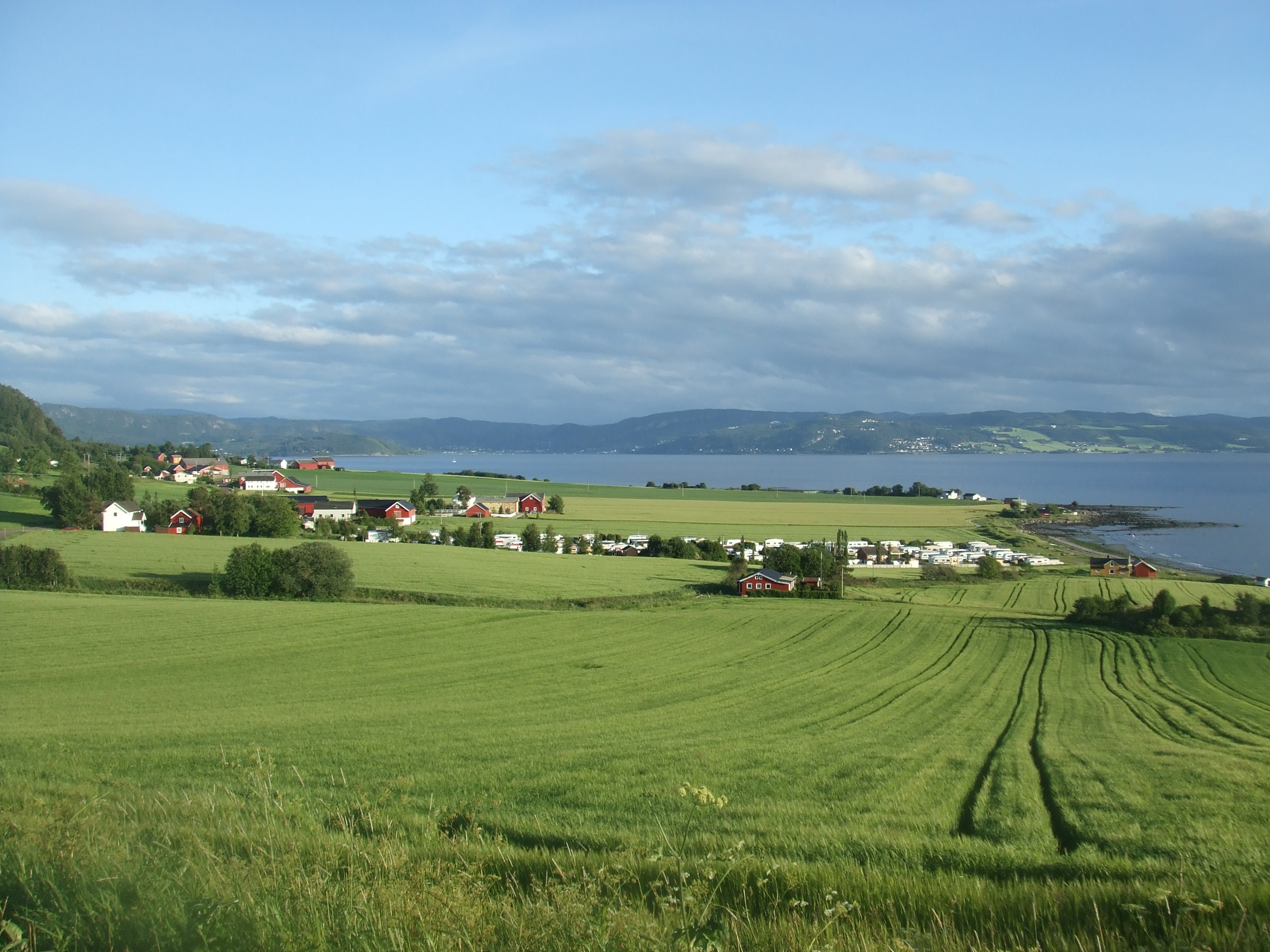
Skatval in July

Trondheim Airport Værnes in Stjørdal Municipality is used by Norway's met office as climate reference station for the Trøndelag region, and is sometimes used as reference station for the city of Trondheim. The weather station started operating in 1946. The location near the wide and deep Trondheimsfjord moderates winter temperatures.

High pressure over Central Norway or to the east can last for weeks, while Atlantic Lows from the west also can dominate for weeks. Such stuck opposite weather patterns was evident in 2020, when May saw northwesterlies with cold air even bringing some snowfall, while the following June was warm and sunny with 345 sun hours and new record high 34.3 °C (94 °F), Norway's warmest high in 2020. The sunniest month on record is May 2024 with 366 sunhours. The airports all-time high 34.5 °C (94 °F) is from 17 July 2025.

The coldest month recorded at Værnes was February 1966 with mean −9.9 °C (14 °F) and average daily high −6 °C (21 °F). The warmest month was July 2014 with mean 19.5 °C (67 °F) and average high 24.9 °C (77 °F), while the weather station at nearby Kvithammar in Stjørdal recorded average high 26.1 °C (79 °F) in July 2014. On 27 June 2020, Værnes set a new record high with 34.3 °C (93.7 °F).

The record lows are all from before year 2000, the most recent is the January record low from 1996. Half of the monthly record highs are from 2000 or later. The warmest temperature ever recorded in Stjørdal was at an earlier weather station on 17 July 1945 with 34.5 °C (94 °F), the warmest temperature recorded in the former Nord-Trøndelag county.

The driest month at Værnes was January 1972 with 0.8 millimetres (0.031 in) of precipitation, and the wettest was December 1975 with 270.2 millimetres (10.64 in). The largest snow depth recorded is 130 centimetres (51 in) in March 1956, while the largest snow depth after 1980 is 71 centimetres (28 in) in January 1986. There are on average 14 days during winter with at least 25 centimetres (9.8 in) of snow cover on the ground based on the years 1971–2000. Temperatures have tended to be warmer in more recent decades with less snow cover in winter due to melting. The only year air frost has been recorded in August was in 1956, and the second-coldest low recorded in August is 1.3 °C (34 °F) in 1966. The only recording of air frost in June was in 1975.

Climate data for Trondheim Airport Værnes 1991–2020 (12 m, extremes 1946–2025, sunhrs 2016–2024)
Month	Jan	Feb	Mar	Apr	May	Jun	Jul	Aug	Sep	Oct	Nov	Dec	Year
Record high °C (°F)	13.7 (56.7)	13.8 (56.8)	15.7 (60.3)	23.3 (73.9)	30 (86)	34.3 (93.7)	34.5 (94.1)	31.3 (88.3)	27.9 (82.2)	22.1 (71.8)	16.1 (61.0)	13.1 (55.6)	34.5 (94.1)
Mean daily maximum °C (°F)	1.9 (35.4)	2.0 (35.6)	4.6 (40.3)	9.3 (48.7)	13.8 (56.8)	17.1 (62.8)	19.8 (67.6)	19.1 (66.4)	15.0 (59.0)	9.3 (48.7)	4.7 (40.5)	2.3 (36.1)	9.9 (49.8)
Daily mean °C (°F)	−1 (30)	−1.1 (30.0)	1 (34)	5.1 (41.2)	9.2 (48.6)	12.6 (54.7)	15.2 (59.4)	14.6 (58.3)	11 (52)	5.8 (42.4)	1.7 (35.1)	−0.7 (30.7)	6.1 (43.0)
Mean daily minimum °C (°F)	−4.1 (24.6)	−4.1 (24.6)	−2.2 (28.0)	1.4 (34.5)	5.3 (41.5)	8.9 (48.0)	11.4 (52.5)	11.0 (51.8)	7.8 (46.0)	2.9 (37.2)	−1.1 (30.0)	−3.9 (25.0)	2.8 (37.0)
Record low °C (°F)	−25.6 (−14.1)	−25.5 (−13.9)	−23.0 (−9.4)	−13.9 (7.0)	−4.7 (23.5)	−0.2 (31.6)	2.3 (36.1)	−0.3 (31.5)	−4.9 (23.2)	−10.8 (12.6)	−19.0 (−2.2)	−23.5 (−10.3)	−25.6 (−14.1)
Average precipitation mm (inches)	64.6 (2.54)	63.9 (2.52)	61.3 (2.41)	42.1 (1.66)	52.7 (2.07)	76.1 (3.00)	74.4 (2.93)	82.8 (3.26)	88.9 (3.50)	77 (3.0)	64.4 (2.54)	75 (3.0)	823.2 (32.43)
Average precipitation days (≥ 1.0 mm)	13	13	13	10	11	13	12	13	13	13	11	14	149
Mean monthly sunshine hours	35.2	70.9	133.3	206.0	249.7	234.4	213.5	168.1	132.7	97.6	49.1	22.1	1,612.6
Source 1: Seklima
Source 2: NOAA-WMO averages 91-2020 Norway

Climate data for Trondheim Airport Værnes 1981–2010 (12 m, 63°27′N 10°55′E, extremes 1946–present)
Month	Jan	Feb	Mar	Apr	May	Jun	Jul	Aug	Sep	Oct	Nov	Dec	Year
Record high °C (°F)	13.7 (56.7)	13.8 (56.8)	15.7 (60.3)	23.3 (73.9)	27.9 (82.2)	34.3 (93.7)	33.5 (92.3)	31.3 (88.3)	27.9 (82.2)	22.1 (71.8)	16.1 (61.0)	13.1 (55.6)	34.3 (93.7)
Mean daily maximum °C (°F)	1.3 (34.3)	1.8 (35.2)	4.4 (39.9)	8.9 (48.0)	13.9 (57.0)	16.7 (62.1)	19.4 (66.9)	18.5 (65.3)	14.5 (58.1)	9.3 (48.7)	4.3 (39.7)	1.8 (35.2)	9.6 (49.2)
Daily mean °C (°F)	−1.8 (28.8)	−1.4 (29.5)	1.1 (34.0)	5.1 (41.2)	9.6 (49.3)	12.8 (55.0)	15.3 (59.5)	14.6 (58.3)	11 (52)	6.3 (43.3)	1.5 (34.7)	−1.3 (29.7)	6.1 (42.9)
Mean daily minimum °C (°F)	−5 (23)	−4.5 (23.9)	−2.3 (27.9)	1.3 (34.3)	5.3 (41.5)	8.8 (47.8)	11.2 (52.2)	10.7 (51.3)	7.4 (45.3)	3.2 (37.8)	−1.3 (29.7)	−4.4 (24.1)	2.5 (36.6)
Record low °C (°F)	−25.6 (−14.1)	−25.5 (−13.9)	−23 (−9)	−13.9 (7.0)	−4.7 (23.5)	−0.2 (31.6)	2.3 (36.1)	−0.3 (31.5)	−4.9 (23.2)	−10.8 (12.6)	−19 (−2)	−23.5 (−10.3)	−25.6 (−14.1)
Average precipitation mm (inches)	74.7 (2.94)	64.7 (2.55)	54.2 (2.13)	44.4 (1.75)	55.3 (2.18)	69.6 (2.74)	87.4 (3.44)	91.8 (3.61)	94.1 (3.70)	83.6 (3.29)	69.4 (2.73)	82 (3.2)	871.2 (34.26)
Average precipitation days (≥ 1.0 mm)	13	12	12	10	11	12	12	13	14	14	12	14	149
Source 1: Meteo climat stats
Source 2: eKlima/met.no

=== Birdlife ===
The Stjørdal area has a rich bird life with well over 260 recorded species and several good birding localities. Though Stjørdal can not boast of a long coastline (it's only 25 kilometres or 16 miles long) some of best birding areas are to be found along Stjørdalfjorden. Halsøen is virtually situated near the centre of Stjørdal, and can be easily viewed from a number of advantage points from route E6 in the east or Langøra in the west. Formed by the old river outlet, this tidal area is worth checking. Due to the shallow waters and extensive areas of mud at low tide, Halsøen is used both as a wintering area and a migration stopover point by many species.

== Culture ==
Kimen kulturhus is a culture house that opened in 2015, which includes a 3-auditorium cinema, a public library, and concert halls.

The radio station Radio Trøndelag is based in Stjørdal, which broadcasts programming targeted to rural Trøndelag audiences, and is the only significant radio station in the Trondheim metropolitan area that still broadcasts on FM.

Sports-wise, the southern farming-based district (the former Lånke Municipality) is the place of the Lånkebanen, a rallycross complex that hosts annual rounds of the FIA World Rallycross Championship and the FIA European Rallycross Championship. The municipality's primary sports team is IL Stjørdals-Blink, whose men's football team currently plays in the 2. divisjon.

== Transportation ==
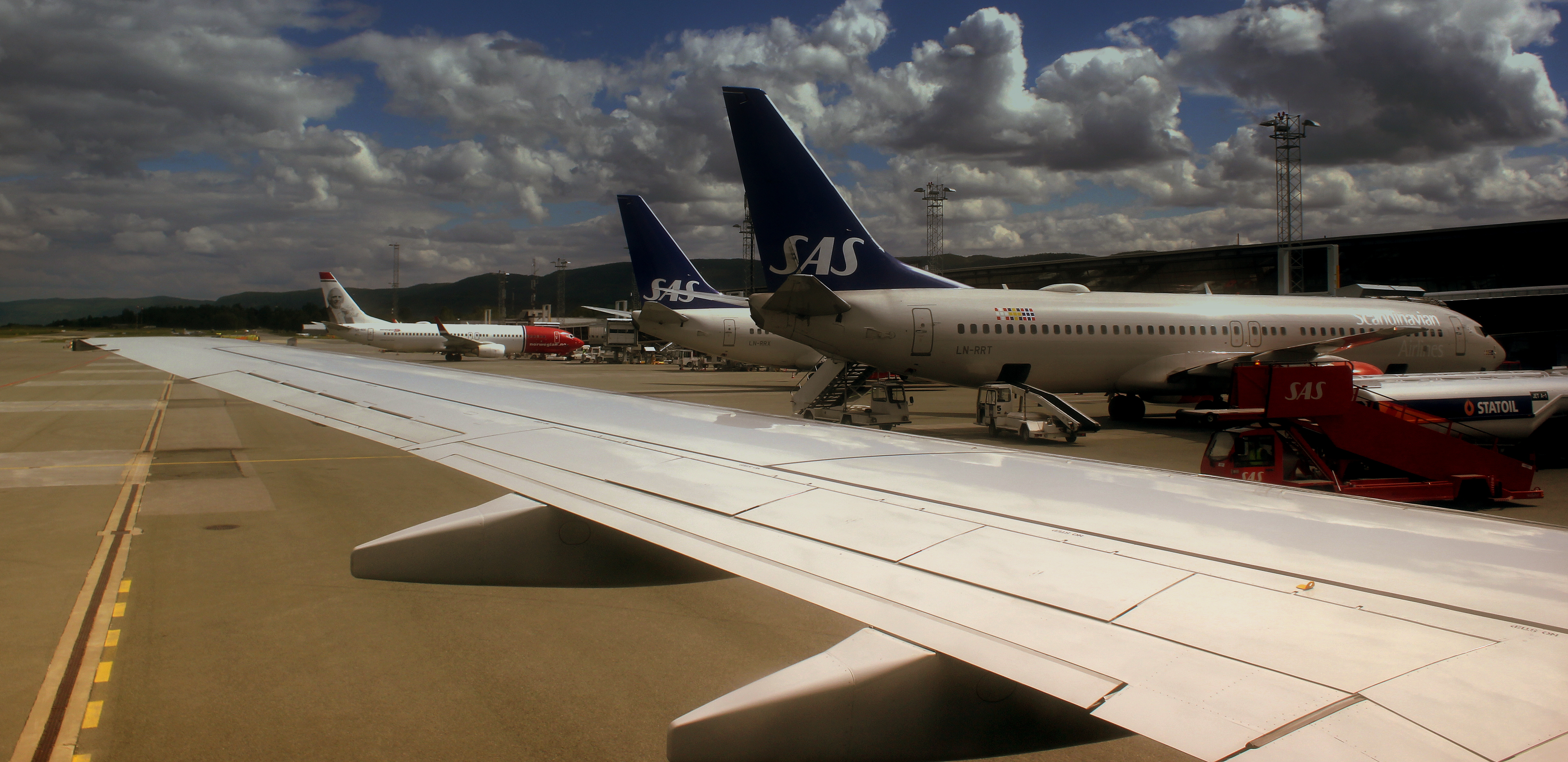
Trondheim Airport Værnes

Stjørdal is a regional transportation centre that is near the regional airport, Trondheim Airport, Værnes, as well as port facilities, European route E6, European route E14, and the Nordland Line going through the municipality from Trondheim to Bodø with stops at Hell Station, Trondheim Airport Station, Stjørdal Station, and Skatval Station. In addition, the Meråkerbanen railway line goes from Hell east to Åre Municipality in Sweden. Stations on that railway line include Hell Station, Hegra Station, Sona Station, and Flornes Station.

Regional bus services connect Stjørdal to Trondheim, Melhus, Orkanger, Steinkjer and Selbu 7 days a week, while two local routes connecting downtown Stjørdal with its northern and southern neighbourhoods run 6 and 5 days a week respectively.

== Notable people ==
=== Public service and public thinking ===
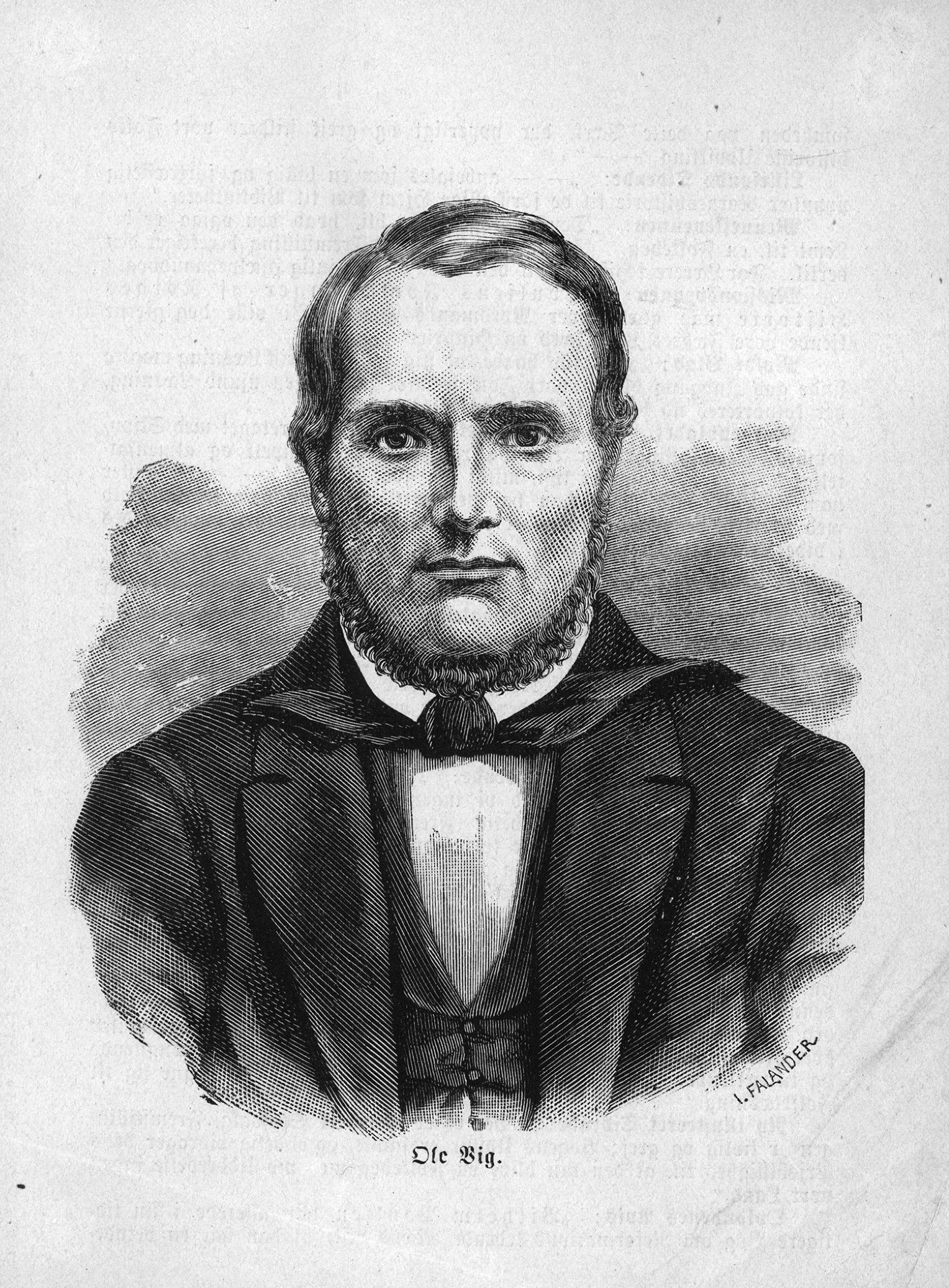
Ole Vig

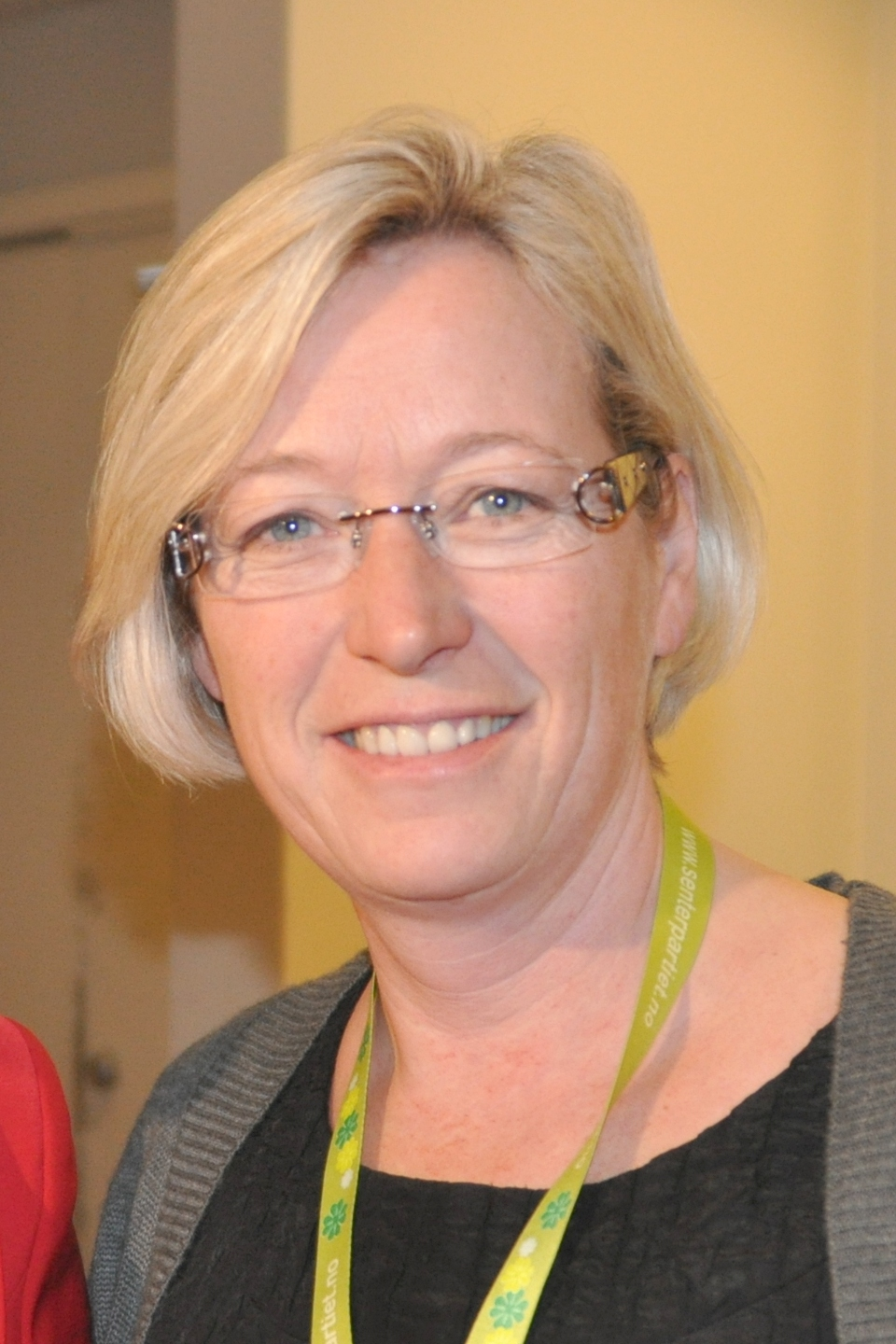
Marit Arnstad, 2009

- Petter Johnsen Ertzgaard (1784 in Stjørdal – 1848), a farmer, elected official, military officer, and representative at the Norwegian Constitutional Assembly
- Ole Vig (1824 in Kvithammer – 1857), a Norwegian teacher, poet, non-fiction writer, magazine editor, and early proponent of universal public education
- Olaf Alfred Hoffstad (1865 in Stjørdal – 1943), a botanist, writer, school principal, and politician
- Andreas Fleischer (1878 in Hegra – 1957), a theologian, missionary to China, and Bishop of Diocese of Bjørgvin
- Johan Peter Trøite (1880 in Hegra – 1977), a politician and Mayor of Hegra from 1937 to 1941
- Jon Leirfall (1899 in Hegra – 1998), a Norwegian politician and Mayor of Hegra from 1959 to 1961
- Alf Amble (1909–1950), a petty criminal, anti-Semitic activist, writer, and Nazi sympathiser in WWII who was brought up in Stjørdal
- Petter Jakob Bjerve (1913 in Stjørdal – 2004), an economist, statistician, politician, director of Statistics Norway from 1949 to 1980, and president of the International Statistical Institute from 1971 to 1975
- Reidar Kvaal MC (1916 in Stjørdal – 2016), a Norwegian military officer who fought in Kompani Linge
- Håvard Alstadheim (1936 in Stjørdal – 1998), an economist, politician, and Mayor of Stjørdal from 1980 to 1985
- Arnstein Øverkil (1937 in Hegra – 2014), a Norwegian police chief, freemason, and civil servant
- Alf Daniel Moen (born 1950 in Hegra), a forester, politician, and Mayor of Stjørdal from 1986–1994 and 1995–1999
- Eli Arnstad (born 1962 in Stjørdal), a Norwegian civil servant, sports official, and politician
- Marit Arnstad (born 1962 in Stjørdal), a Norwegian lawyer and politician

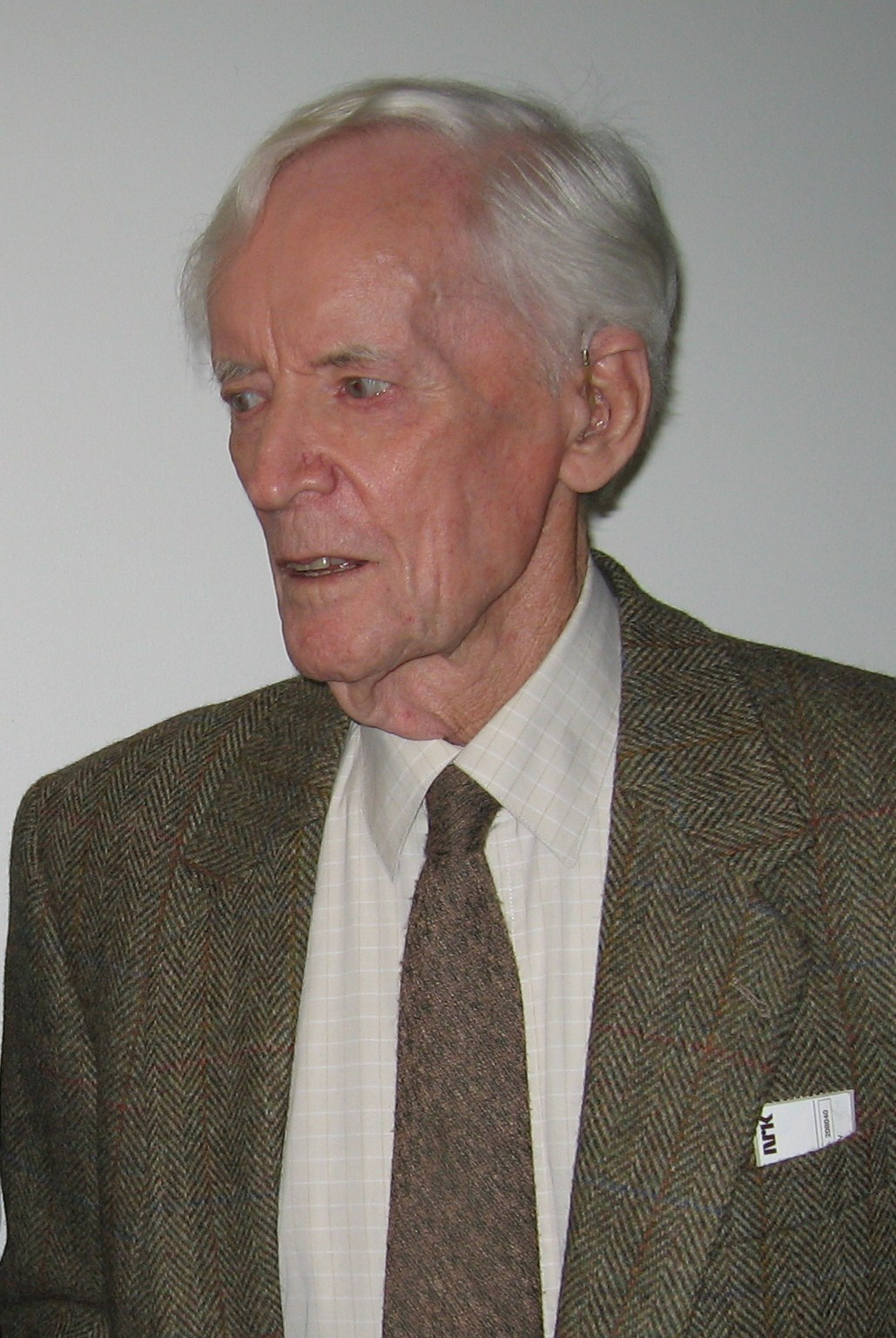
Kjell Arnljot Wig, 2009

=== The Arts ===
- Kjell Arnljot Wig (1924 in Stjørdal – 2015), a Norwegian media personality and TV host
- Mona Grudt (born 1971 in Stjørdal), a TV host, model, editor, and Miss Universe 1990
- Bjørn Marius Hegge (born 1987 in Elvran), a jazz musician and composer who plays upright bass and guitar

=== Sport ===
- Tor Richter (1938 in Stjørdal – 2010), a sports shooter who competed at the 1960 Summer Olympics
- Arild Holm (born 1942 in Stjørdal), an alpine skier who competed at the 1964 Winter Olympics
- Kjell Alseth (born 1960 in Stjørdal), a Norwegian football FIFA referee
- Fredrik Midtsjø (born 1993 in Stjørdal), a Norwegian footballer with 230 club caps

== Twin towns – sister cities ==
Stjørdal is twinned with:

- Karstula, Finland
