= Prestmoen =

Village in Stjørdal Municipality, Norway

- Village
- Interactive map of Prestmoen
- Location within Trøndelag Location within Norway
- Coordinates: 63.4489°N 10.9670°E
- Country: Norway
- Region: Central Norway
- County: Trøndelag
- District: Stjørdalen
- Municipality: Stjørdal Municipality

Area
  - Total: 0.2 km^{2} (0.077 sq mi)
- Elevation: 5 m (16 ft)

Population (2024)
  - Total: 391
  - Density: 1,955/km^{2} (5,060/sq mi)
- Time zone: UTC+01:00 (CET)
  - Summer (DST): UTC+02:00 (CEST)
- Post Code: 7500 Stjørdal

Prestmoen is a village in Stjørdal Municipality in Trøndelag county, Norway. It is located along the Stjørdalselva river in the central part of the municipality, about 4 kilometres (2.5 mi) southeast of the town of Stjørdalshalsen. The village is the location of Værnes Church.

The 0.2-square-kilometre (49-acre) village has a population (2024) of 391 and a population density of 1,955 inhabitants per square kilometre (5,060/sq mi).
