= Skjelstadmarka =

Village in Stjørdal Municipality, Norway

- Village
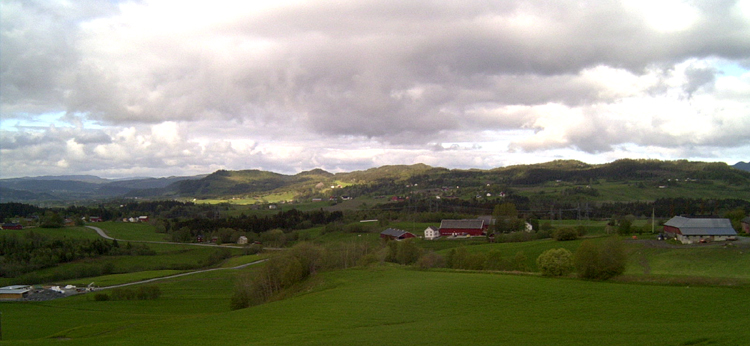
- View of the village
- Interactive map of Skjelstadmarka
- Location within Trøndelag Location within Norway
- Coordinates: 63.5135°N 11.0842°E
- Country: Norway
- Region: Central Norway
- County: Trøndelag
- District: Stjørdalen
- Municipality: Stjørdal Municipality
- Elevation: 80 m (260 ft)
- Time zone: UTC+01:00 (CET)
  - Summer (DST): UTC+02:00 (CEST)
- Post Code: 7520 Hegra

Skjelstadmarka is a village in Stjørdal Municipality in Trøndelag county, Norway. It is located in the central part of the municipality, about 12 kilometres (7.5 mi) northeast of the town of Stjørdalshalsen, about 5 kilometres (3.1 mi) north of the village of Hegra, and about 10 kilometres (6.2 mi) east of the mountain Forbordsfjellet. The village is the location of Okkelberg Chapel.
