= Okkelberg Chapel =

Church in Trøndelag, Norway

- Okkelberg kapell
- Okkelberg Chapel
- 63.519340895°N 11.073367148°E
- Location: Stjørdal Municipality, Trøndelag
- Country: Norway
- Denomination: Church of Norway
- Churchmanship: Evangelical Lutheran

History
- Status: Parish church
- Founded: 1905
- Consecrated: Sept 1906

Architecture
- Functional status: Active
- Architect: Ole Andresen
- Architectural type: Long church
- Completed: 1905 (121 years ago)

Specifications
- Capacity: 200
- Materials: Wood

Administration
- Diocese: Nidaros bispedømme
- Deanery: Stjørdal prosti
- Parish: Hegra
- Norwegian Cultural Heritage Site
- Type: Church
- Status: Not protected
- ID: 85202

Okkelberg Chapel (Norwegian: Okkelberg kapell) is a parish church of the Church of Norway in Stjørdal Municipality in Trøndelag county, Norway. It is located in the village of Skjelstadmarka. It is one of the churches for the Hegra parish which is part of the Stjørdal prosti (deanery) in the Diocese of Nidaros. The white, wooden church was built in a long church style in 1905 using plans drawn up by the architect Ole Andresen. The church seats about 200 people.

== History ==
A royal decree on 11 June 1904 granted permission for the parish to build a chapel here. The chapel was designed by Ole Andresen as a wooden long church with a west tower and a choir in the east. There is a sacristy on both the north and south sides of the choir. The new chapel was completed in 1905 and it was formally consecrated in September 1906.

== See also ==
- List of churches in Nidaros
