= Stjørdal Church =

Church in Trøndelag, Norway

- Stjørdal kirke
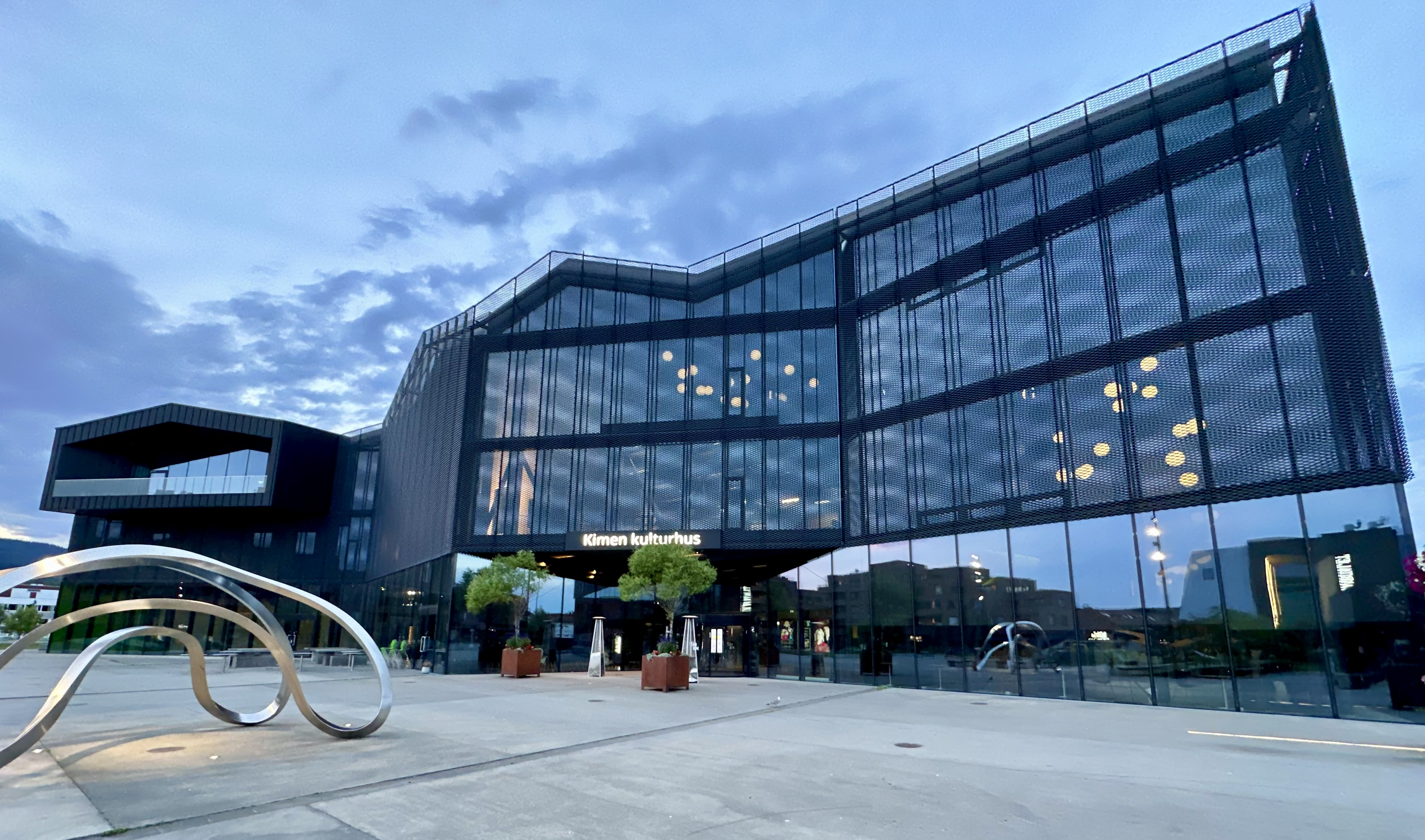
- View of the church
- Stjørdal Church
- 63°28′12″N 10°55′41″E
- Location: Stjørdal,Trøndelag
- Country: Norway
- Denomination: Church of Norway
- Churchmanship: Evangelical Lutheran

History
- Status: Parish church
- Consecrated: 30 Aug 2015

Architecture
- Functional status: Active
- Architectural type: Rectangular
- Completed: 2015 (11 years ago)

Specifications
- Capacity: 240
- Materials: Stone

Administration
- Diocese: Nidaros
- Deanery: Stjørdal prosti
- Parish: Stjørdal

Stjørdal Church (Norwegian: Stjørdal kirke) is a parish church of the Church of Norway in Stjørdal Municipality in Trøndelag county, Norway. It is located in the town of Stjørdalshalsen. It is one of the churches for the Stjørdal parish which is part of the Stjørdal prosti (deanery) in the Diocese of Nidaros. The modern, stone church was built in a rectangular design in 2015 using plans drawn up by the architect Kai Rune Bakke. The church seats about 240 people.

== History ==
The church was built in 2015 as part of a larger multi-purpose facility: the Kimen kulturhus. The building contains a library; art gallery; cinemas; cafe; stages adapted for theater, dance, concerts, etc.; a cultural school; a youth club; and Stjørdal Church. In 2016, an outdoor park with a playground and opportunities for outdoor concerts opened next to the cultural center. Stjørdal Church is integrated as part of the cultural center and is located in the northern part of the building, with a separate entrance.

== See also ==
- List of churches in Nidaros
