= Alf Amble =

Norwegian activist and writer

Alf Maria Amble (1909–1950) was a Norwegian antisemitic activist and writer.

He was born in Trondhjem, but grew up in a foster home in Stjørdal Municipality. He took a short technical education in Oslo in 1925–1926, but committed several petty crimes in his young days. He was given a new chance to migrate to Canada, but was sentenced for crimes there too, and was extradited. After spending some time at sea he returned to Norway in 1928–1929. He worked briefly within the Communist Party of Norway, but later shifted to the far right and joined Fatherland League. Before the Second World War he was also affiliated with the Nazi party National Socialist Workers' Party of Norway, and was a member of the Deutscher Fichte-Bund from 1937. He was briefly involved in the Oxford Movement, but made a break with this organization.

He committed more crimes around 1930, was convicted of breaking and entering and sentenced to three years in prison. He was released from Opstad tvangsarbeidshus in 1933, and despite taking the examen artium in 1934 he spent most of his future career as an activist. Historian Terje Emberland has analyzed his views as loosely based on Norse mythology, with millennialistic and messianistic aspects. Amble was also a fervent antisemite; Emberland has used Saul Friedländer's term "redemptive anti-Semitism" to describe Amble's views.

He became known for pasting activistic posters in the streets of Oslo, particularly in December 1938, when his actions were probably inspired by the Kristallnacht. Amble was arrested and tried for these antisemitic posters. He fled Norway for Germany after being released from detention, then returned in the autumn of 1939, and was acquitted. As a part of the trial Amble was assessed by forensic psychiatrist Gabriel Langfeldt, who among other things diagnosed Amble with "enduringly weakened mental faculties". Langfeldt (and Ørnulv Ødegård) would later, famously, apply the same diagnosis to the Nobel Prize in Literature recipient Knut Hamsun. Amble's defender was Albert Wiesener.

In addition to producing posters, Amble held public speeches, ran the small publishing house Nor-press, published a periodical called Vår kamp ("Our Struggle", cf. "My Struggle") and led his own association named Norrøna. In 1940 he released the book Mak benak. Boken om menneskeofringer, where he tried to corroborate his ideas of blood libel. He also released the crime novel Ti kjennes for rett in 1942, with a protagonist whoa was a Germanic supremacist. In a review, Aftenposten called it a "product of little interest". He managed to write with a fair amount of suspense, but the book lacked in fantasy and logic. Amble is also known for translating Hávamál.

During the occupation of Norway by Nazi Germany, which lasted from 1940 to 1945, Amble was recruited as an agent for Abwehr. His day job was as a German language teacher. He joined the party Nasjonal Samling in 1941, but left in 1942. He instead founded the "peace association" Runa, which was proscripted in 1943. After the occupation's end, he was arrested in late May 1945, then released awaiting trial. In 1947 he re-published Fredsboka, this time on his own publishing house Ama Forlag. In 1947 he was convicted of treason and sentenced to four years of forced labour. He was released in 1950, the year he died.
