= Alf Daniel Moen =

Norwegian politician (born 1950)

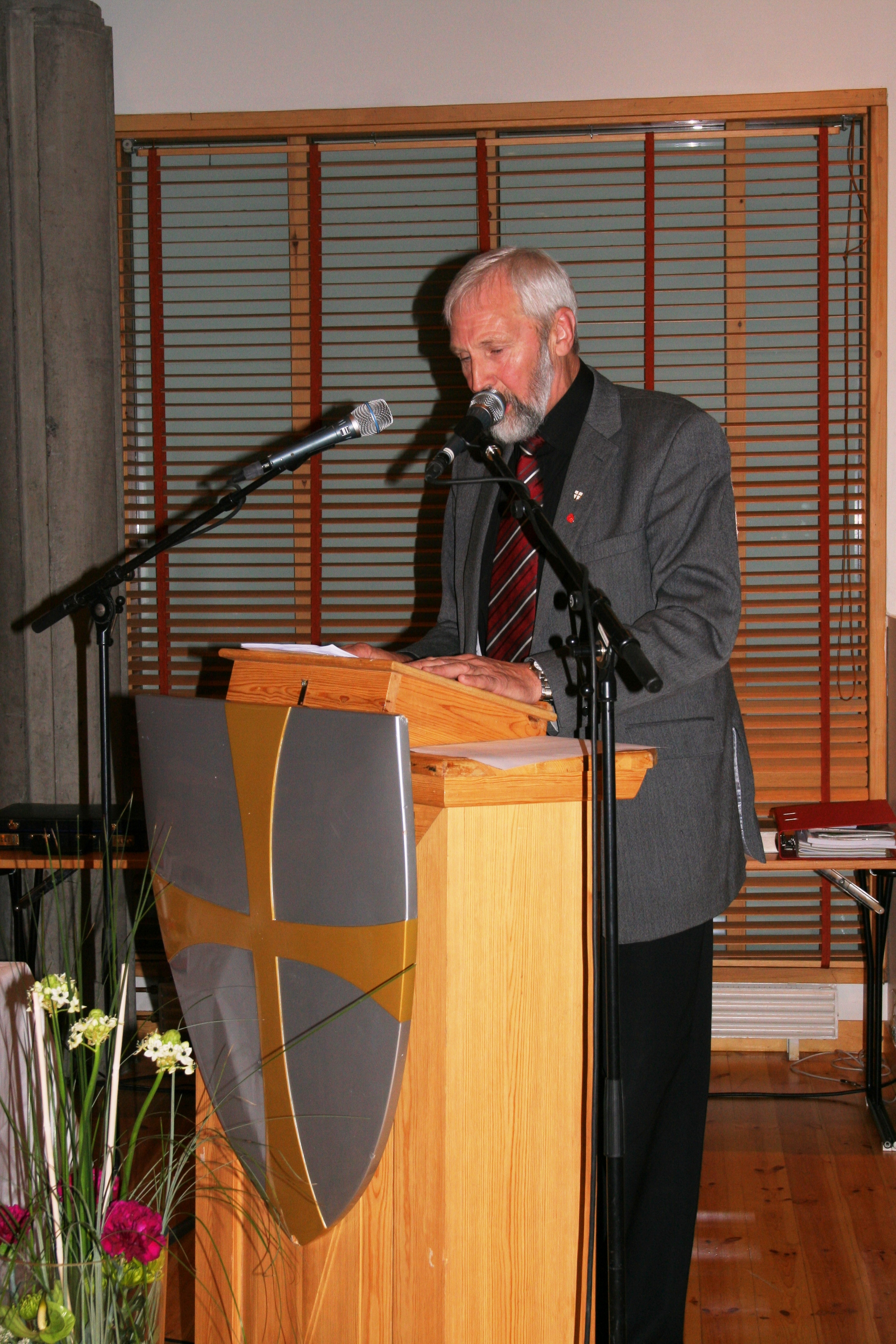

Chairman of Nord-Trøndelag County Cabinet
- In office 2003–2011

Personal details
- Born: 2 February 1950 (age 76)
- Party: Labour Party
- Profession: Forester

Alf Daniel Moen (born 2 February 1950) is a Norwegian forester and politician for the Labour Party. He lives in Hegra and was mayor of Stjørdal Municipality from 1986 to 1994 and from 1995 to 1999. Moen has been leader of the county cabinet of Nord-Trøndelag county municipality since 2003, and was reelected in 2007. He took over as the political leader of the Landsdelsutvalget (Regional Council) in 2009.

Political offices
New post	County cabinet leader of Nord-Trøndelag; 2003–2011	Succeeded by Ingvild Kjerkol
