= Værnes Church =

Church in Trøndelag, Norway

- Værnes kirke
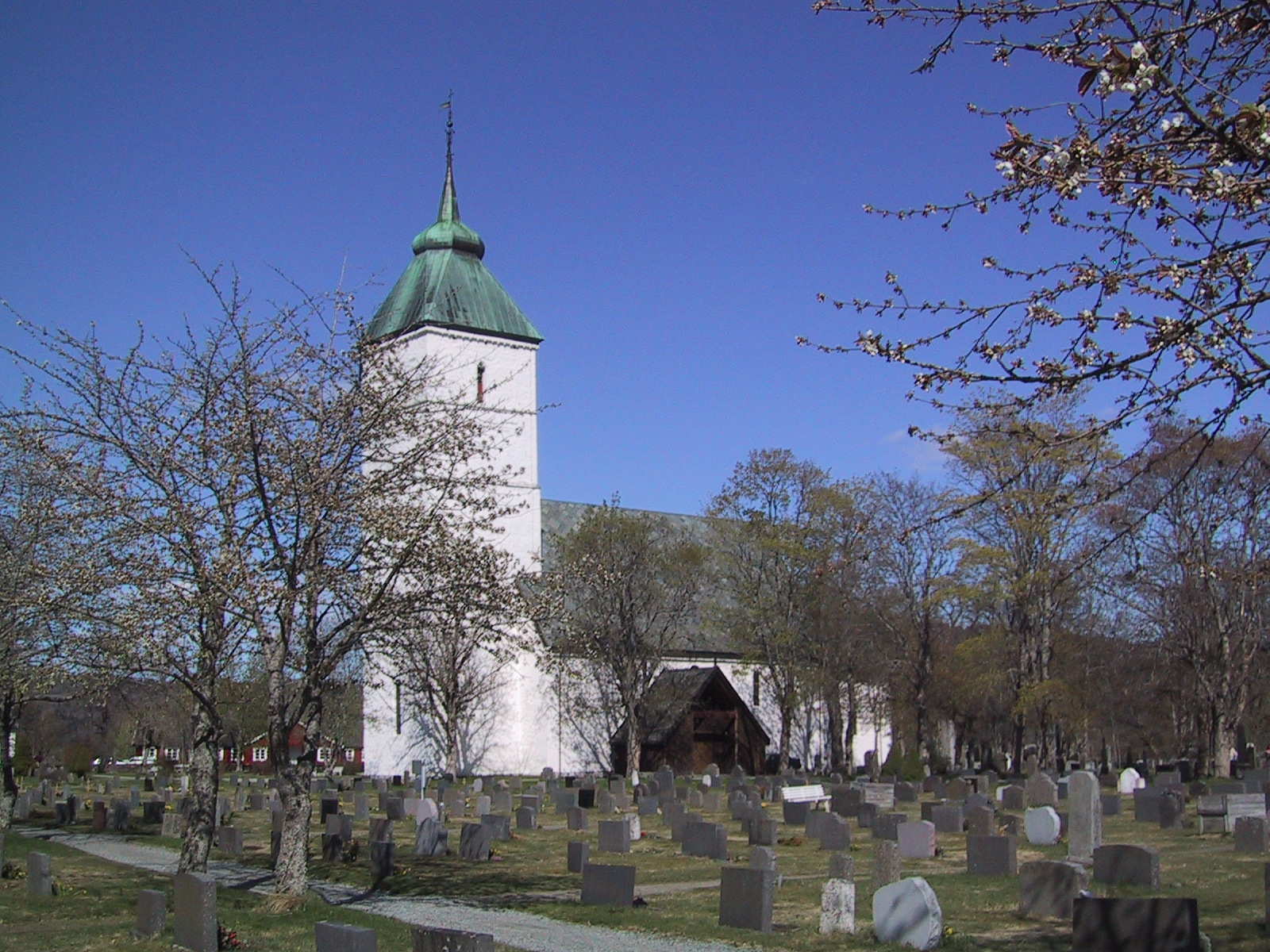
- View of the church
- Værnes Church
- 63.454281809°N 10.954871177°E
- Location: Stjørdal Municipality, Trøndelag
- Country: Norway
- Denomination: Church of Norway
- Previous denomination: Catholic Church
- Churchmanship: Evangelical Lutheran

History
- Status: Parish church
- Founded: c. 1130 (896 years ago)
- Consecrated: c. 1190 (836 years ago)

Architecture
- Functional status: Active
- Architectural type: Long church
- Completed: c. 1190 (836 years ago)

Specifications
- Capacity: 370
- Materials: Stone

Administration
- Diocese: Nidaros bispedømme
- Deanery: Stjørdal prosti
- Parish: Stjørdal
- Norwegian Cultural Heritage Site
- Type: Church
- Status: Automatically protected
- ID: 85875

Værnes Church (Norwegian: Værnes kirke) is a parish church of the Church of Norway in Stjørdal Municipality in Trøndelag county, Norway. It is located just south of the town of Stjørdalshalsen, along the Stjørdalselva river, and just east of the Trondheim Airport, Værnes. It is the church for the Stjørdal parish which is also the seat of the Stjørdal prosti (deanery) in the Diocese of Nidaros. The white, stone church was built in a long church style in five stages from 1130 until 1190 by using plans drawn up by unknown architect. The church seats about 370 people.

== History ==
The earliest existing historical records of the church date back to the year 1391, but the church was built before that time. The church was probably constructed during the 12th century in several stages from around 1130-1190. It is a stone building with a rectangular nave, a narrower, rectangular chancel and a tower to the west. The choir was completed around the year 1140 and the nave and base of the tower were finished around the year 1190. During a construction project in the 13th century, the tower was raised by two floors, the windows in the chancel and the nave were widened inside, and the base of the tower was likely vaulted at the same time. A sacristy was built on the north side of the choir in 1506-1507.

In 1814, this church served as an election church (Norwegian: valgkirke). Together with more than 300 other parish churches across Norway, it was a polling station for elections to the 1814 Norwegian Constituent Assembly which wrote the Constitution of Norway. This was Norway's first national elections. Each church parish was a constituency that elected people called "electors" who later met together in each county to elect the representatives for the assembly that was to meet at Eidsvoll Manor later that year.

The church and tower barely survived World War II. The tower is clearly visible from a long distance, and there were fears that it could be used as a landmark and would be bombed. The church was painted in camouflage colors, and was repainted in its normal white color after the war was over.

== Media gallery ==
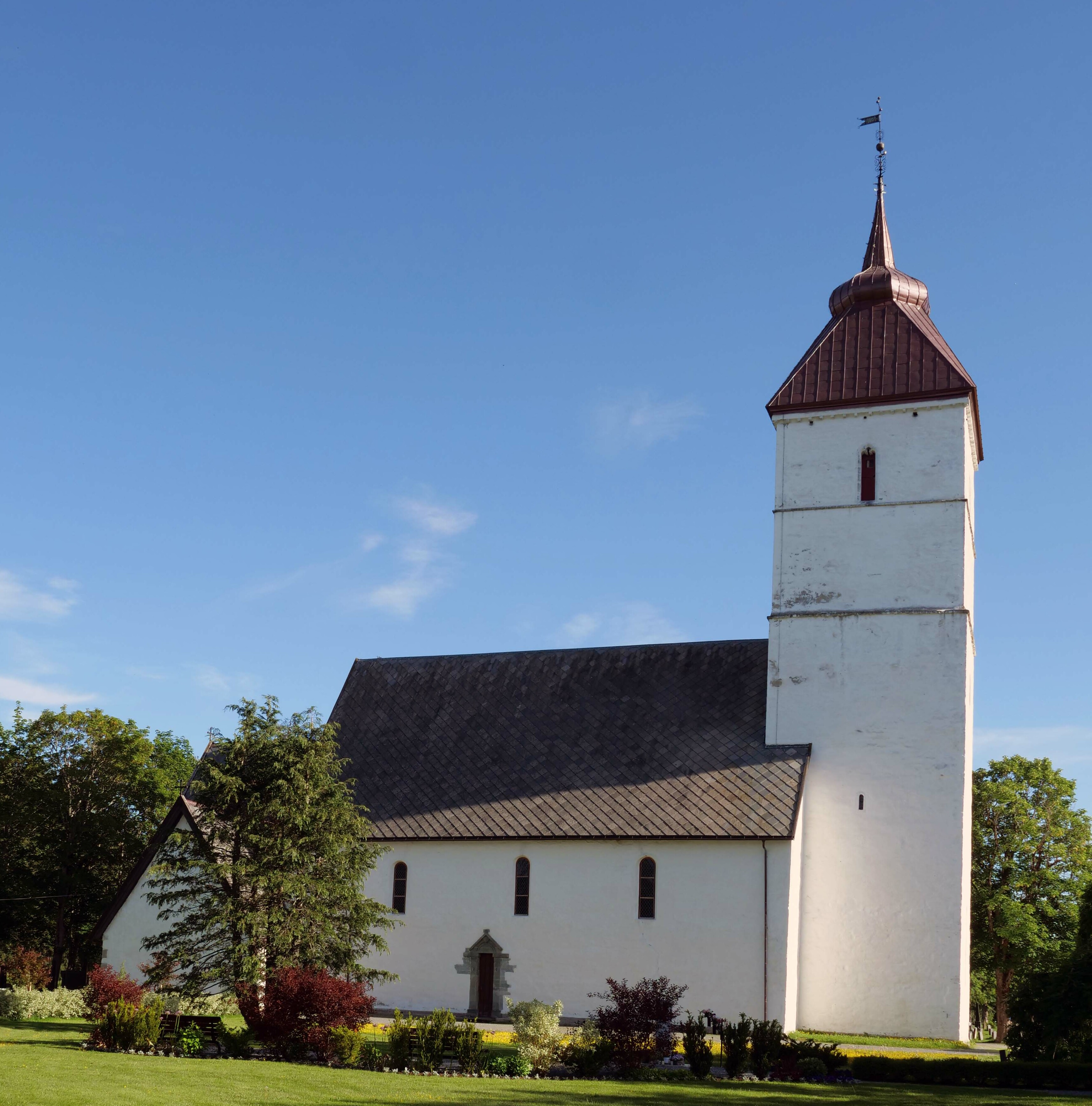

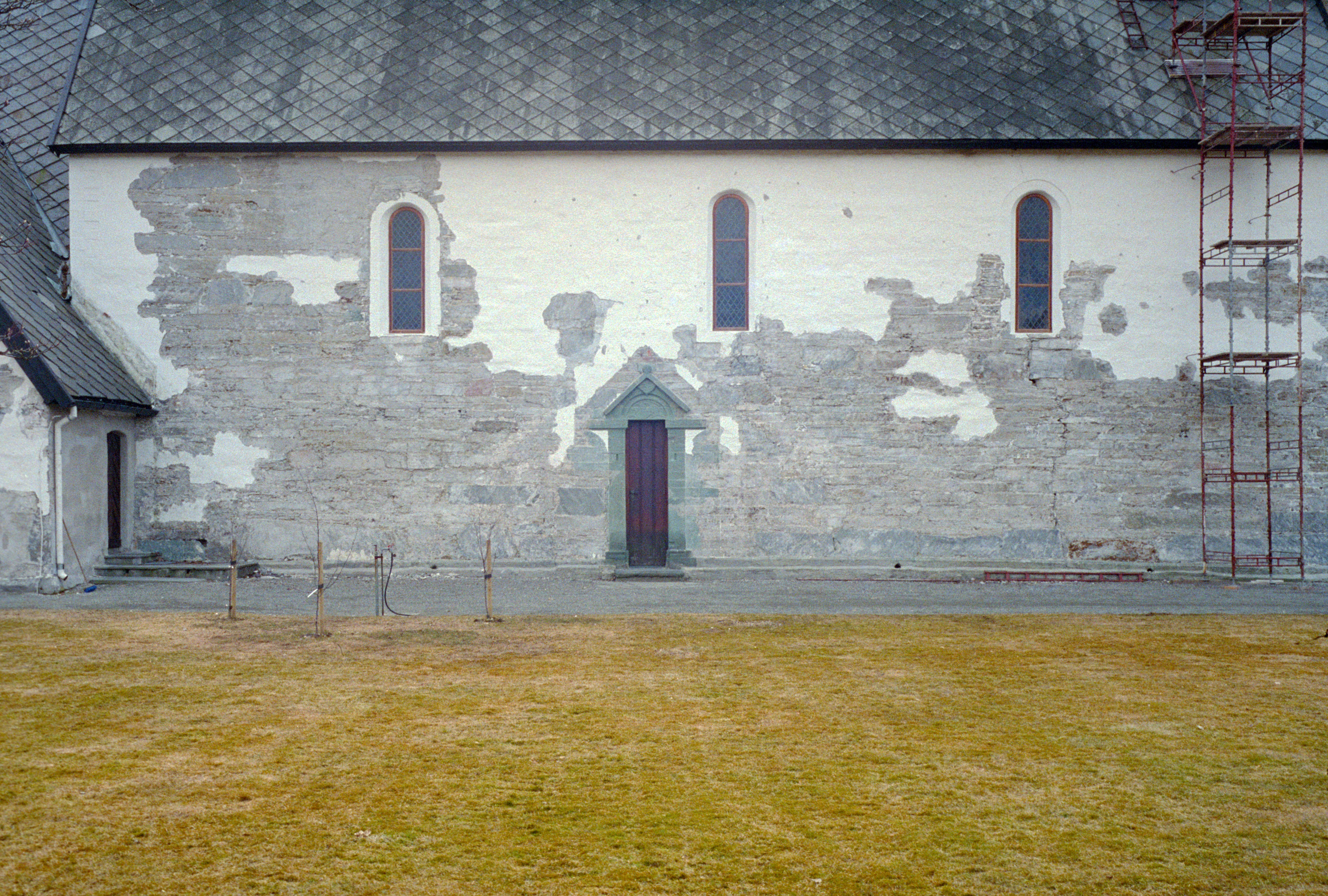

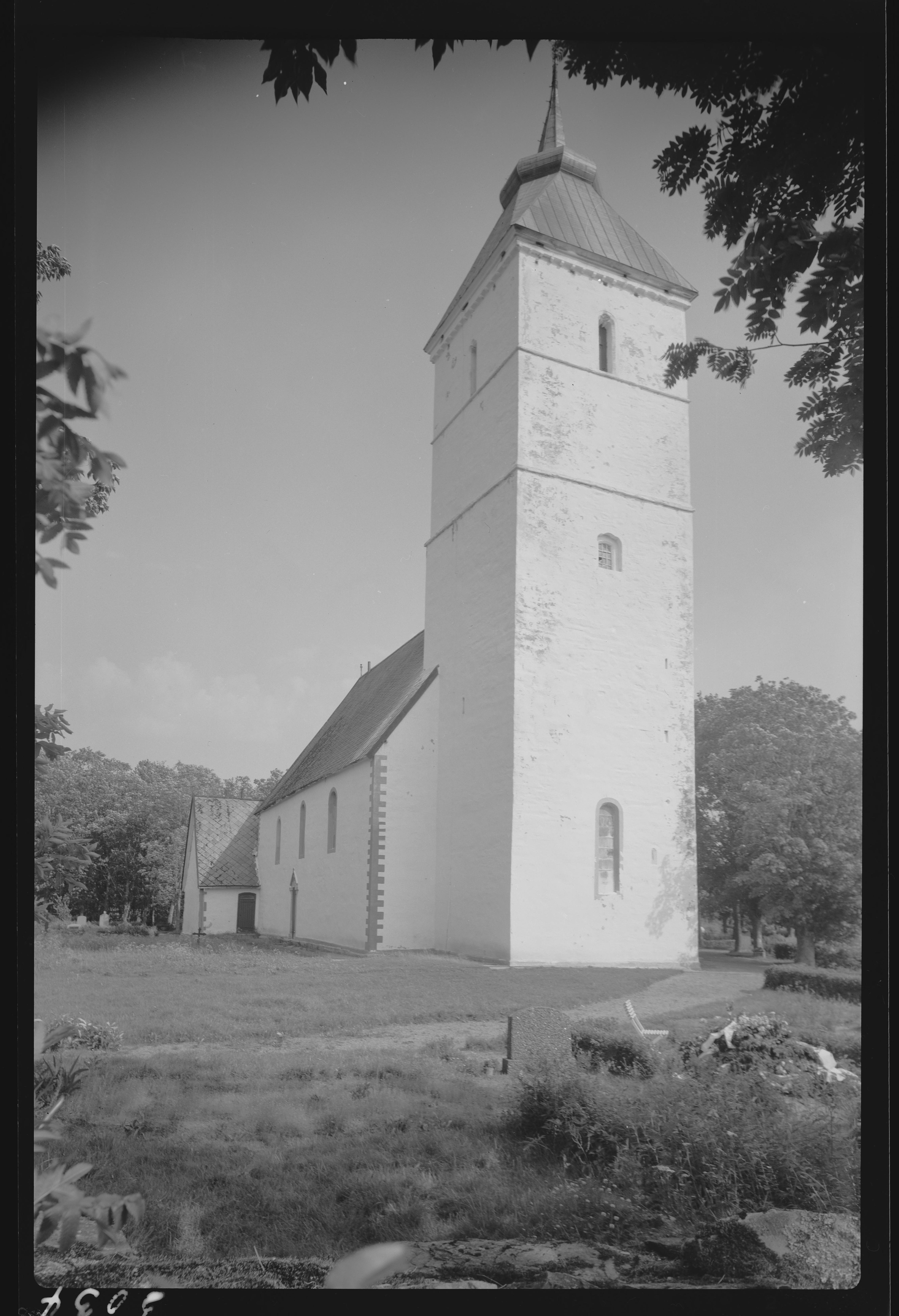

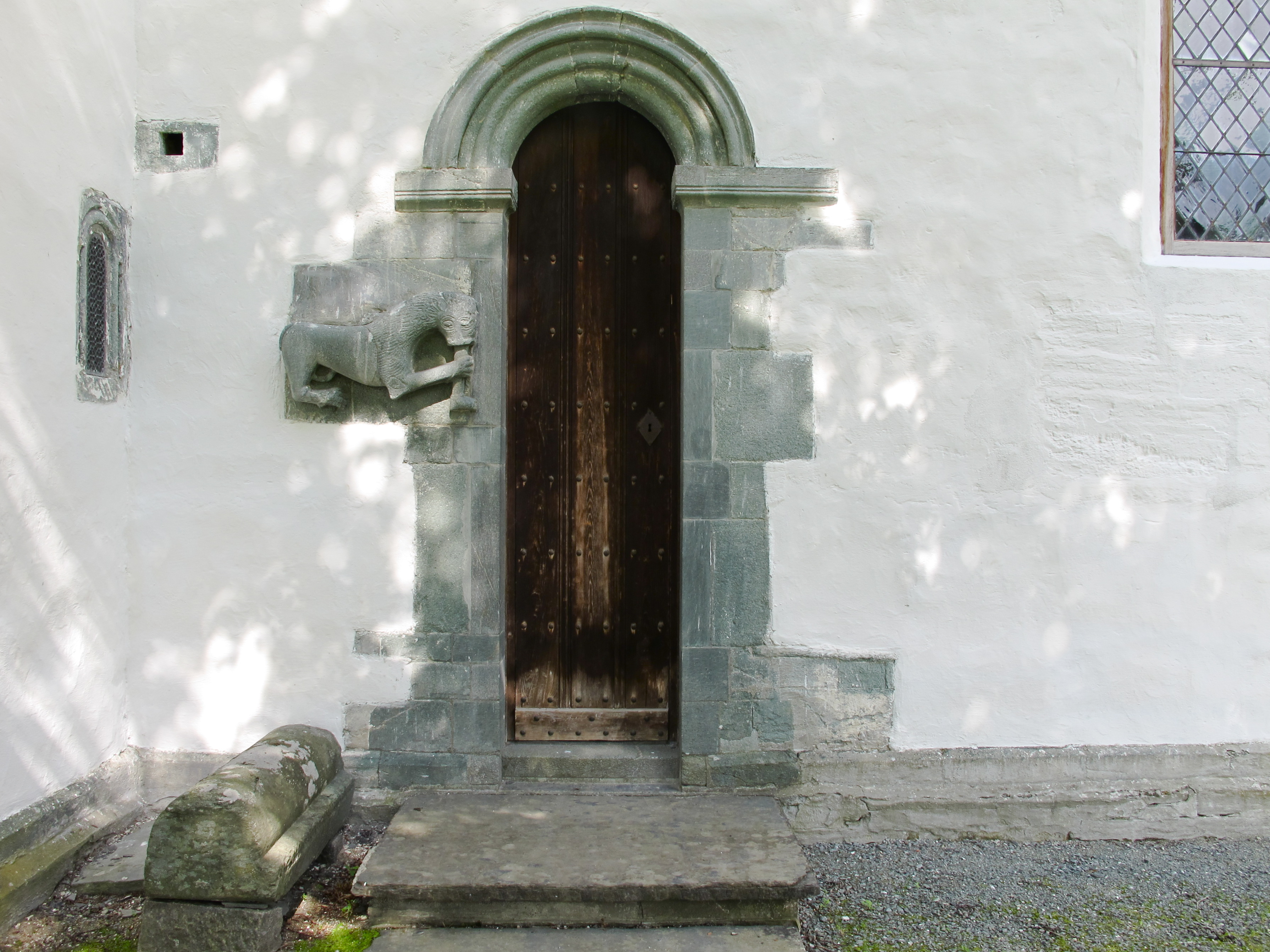

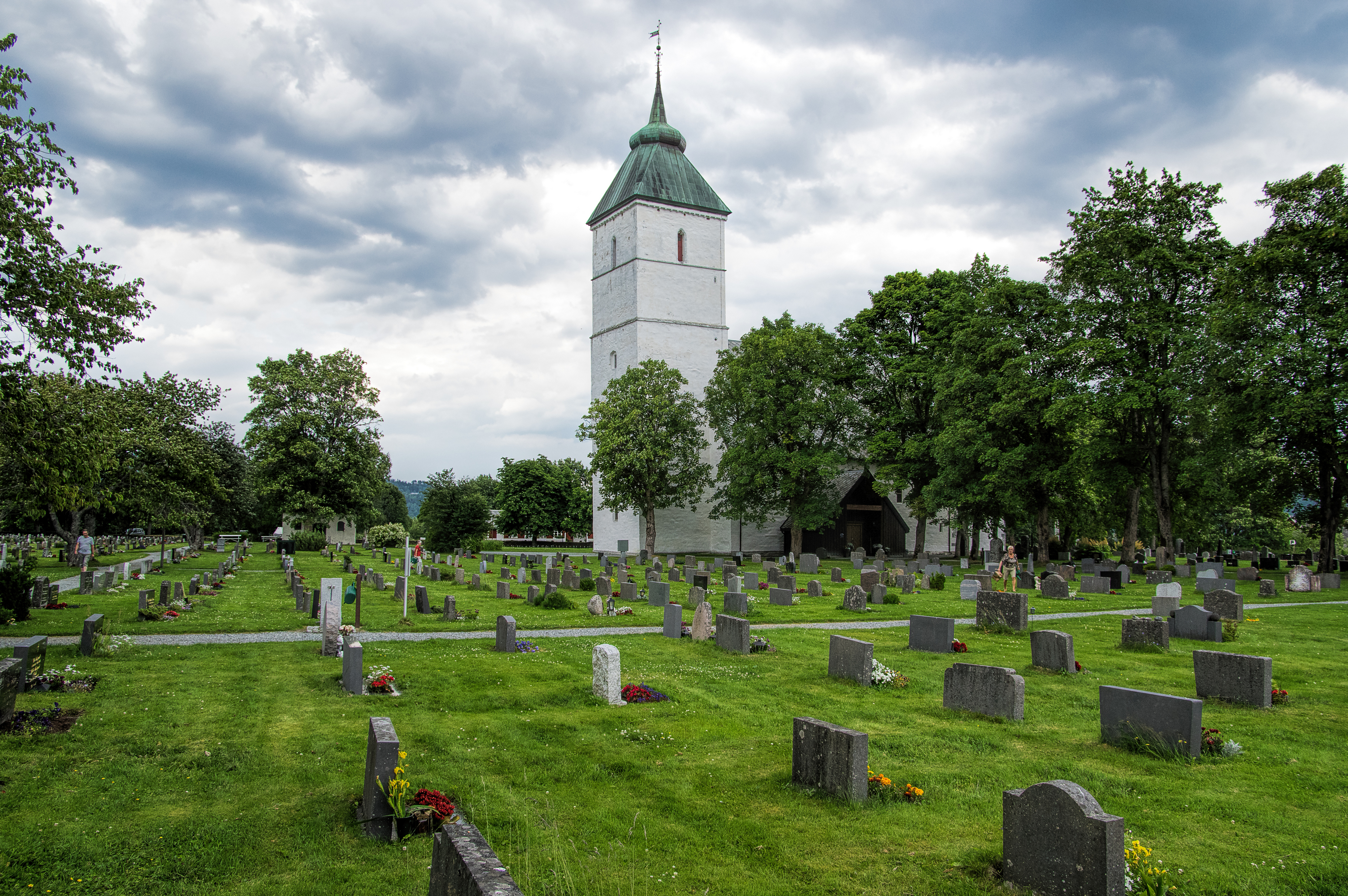

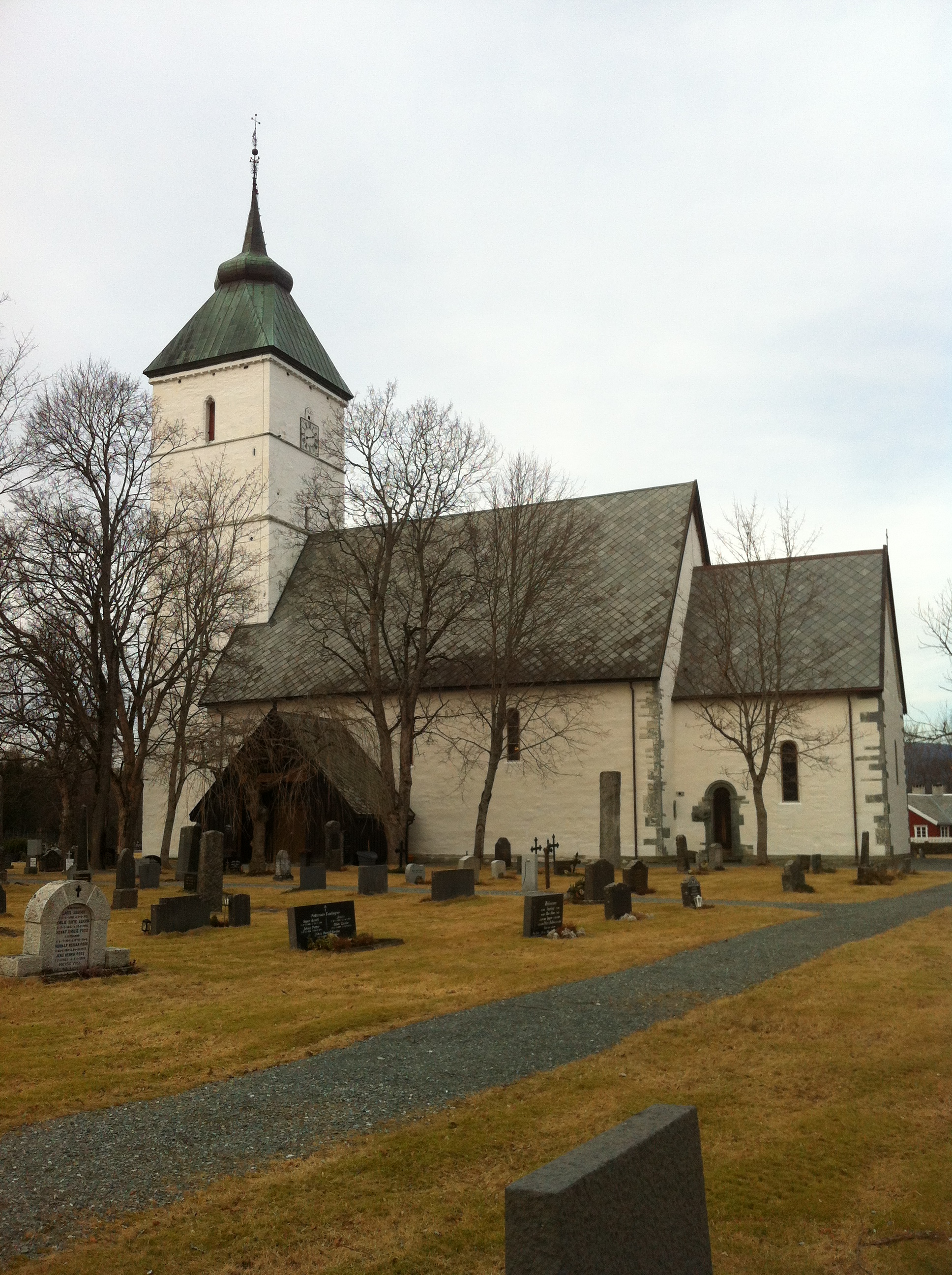

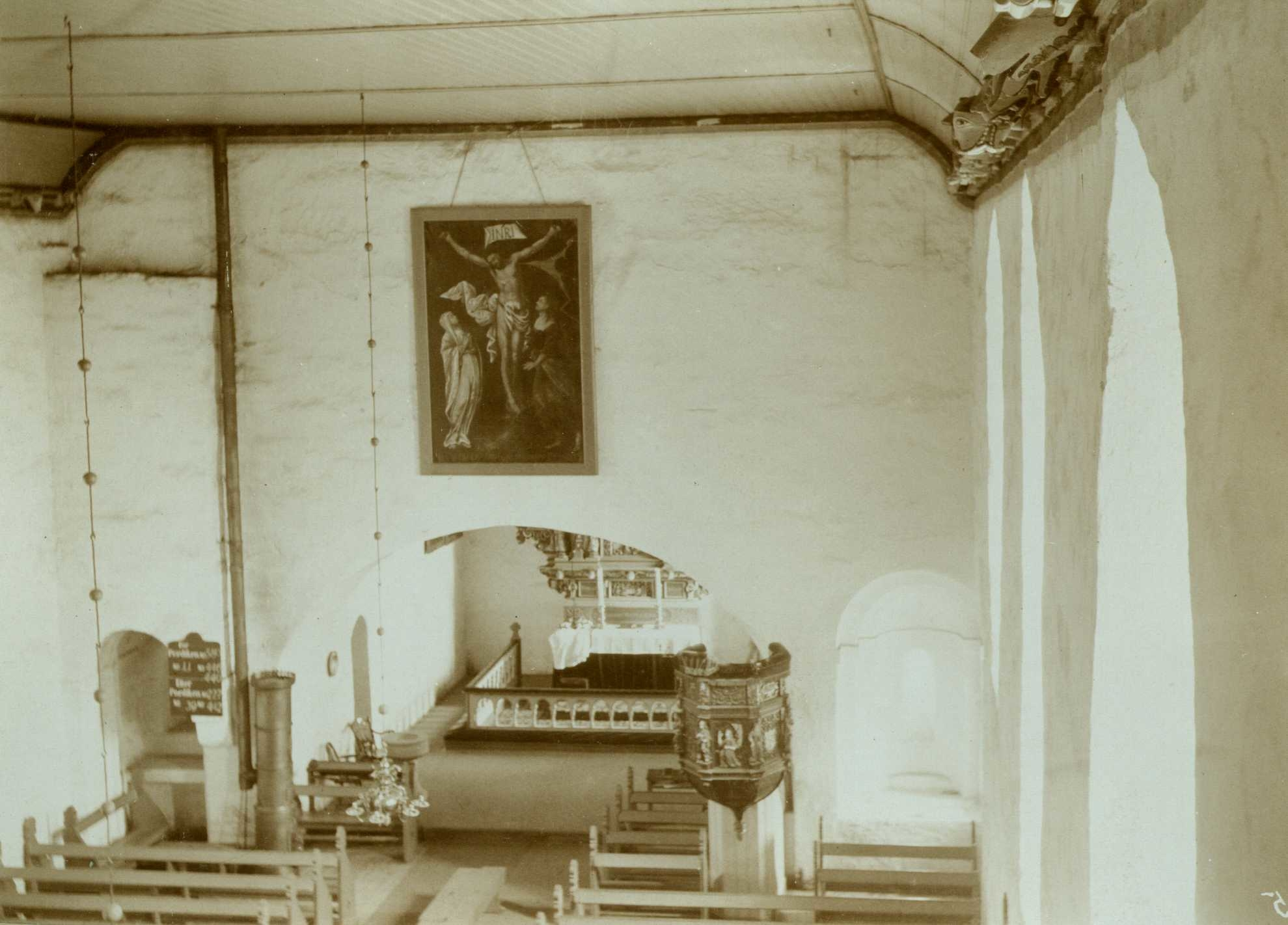

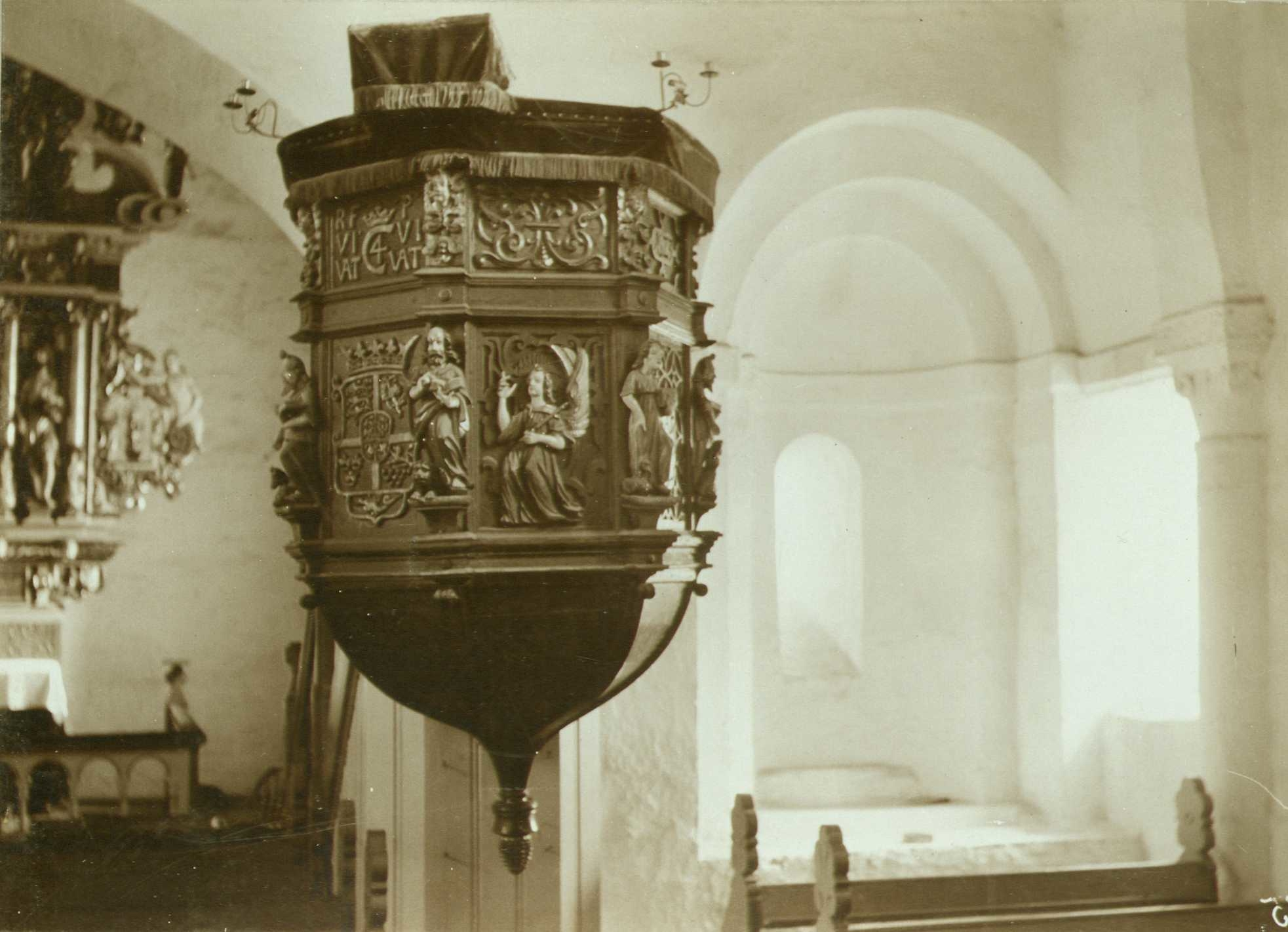

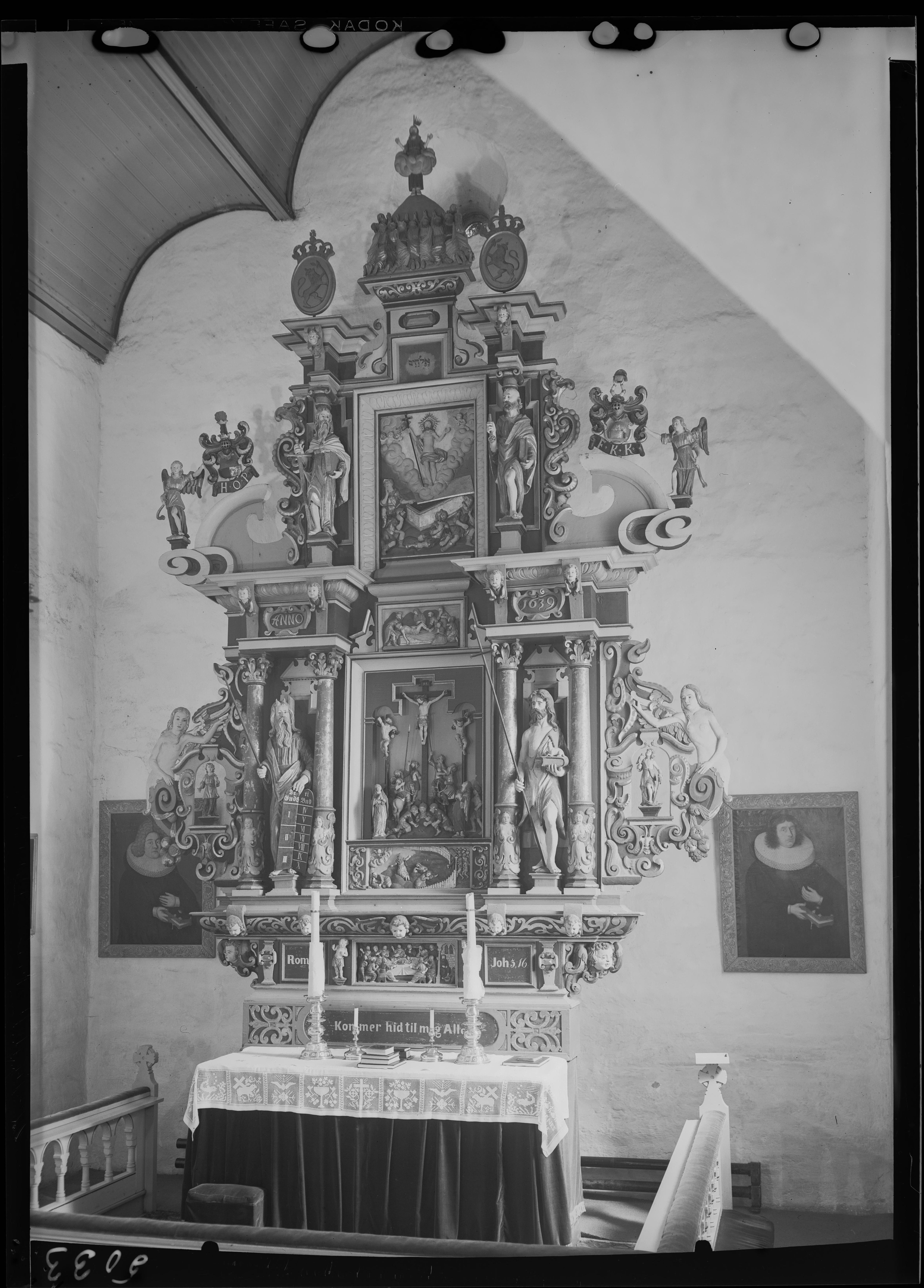

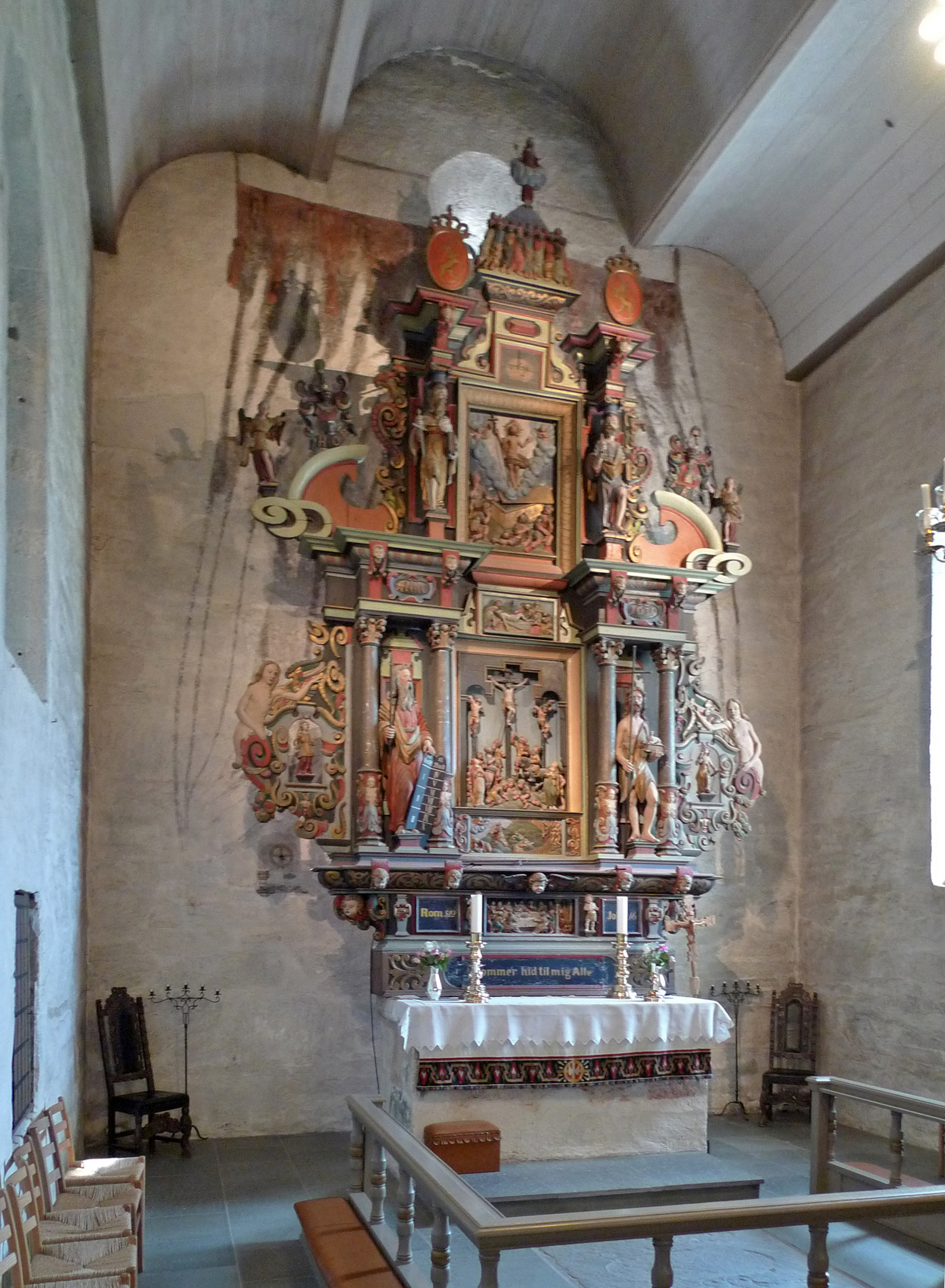

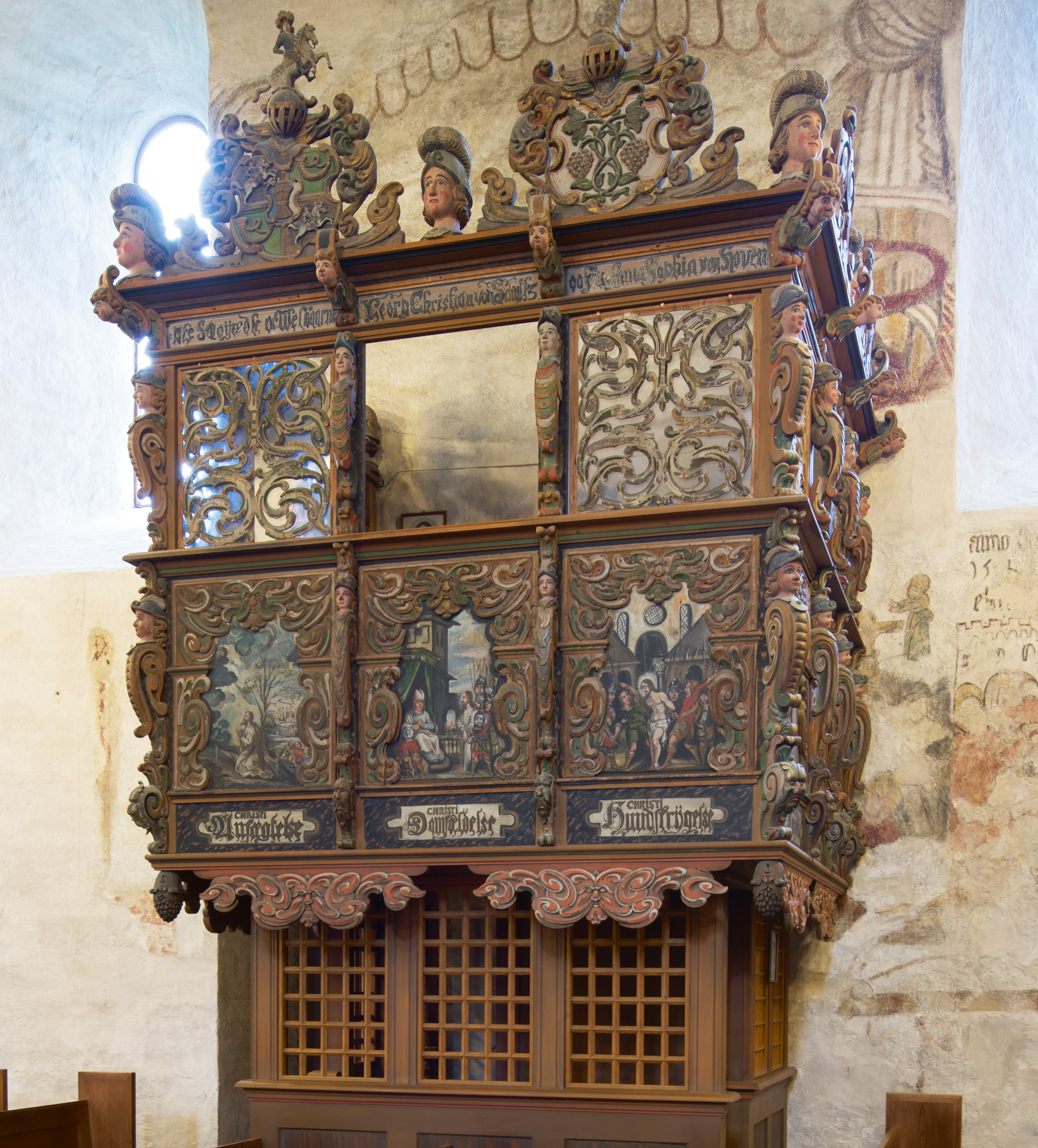

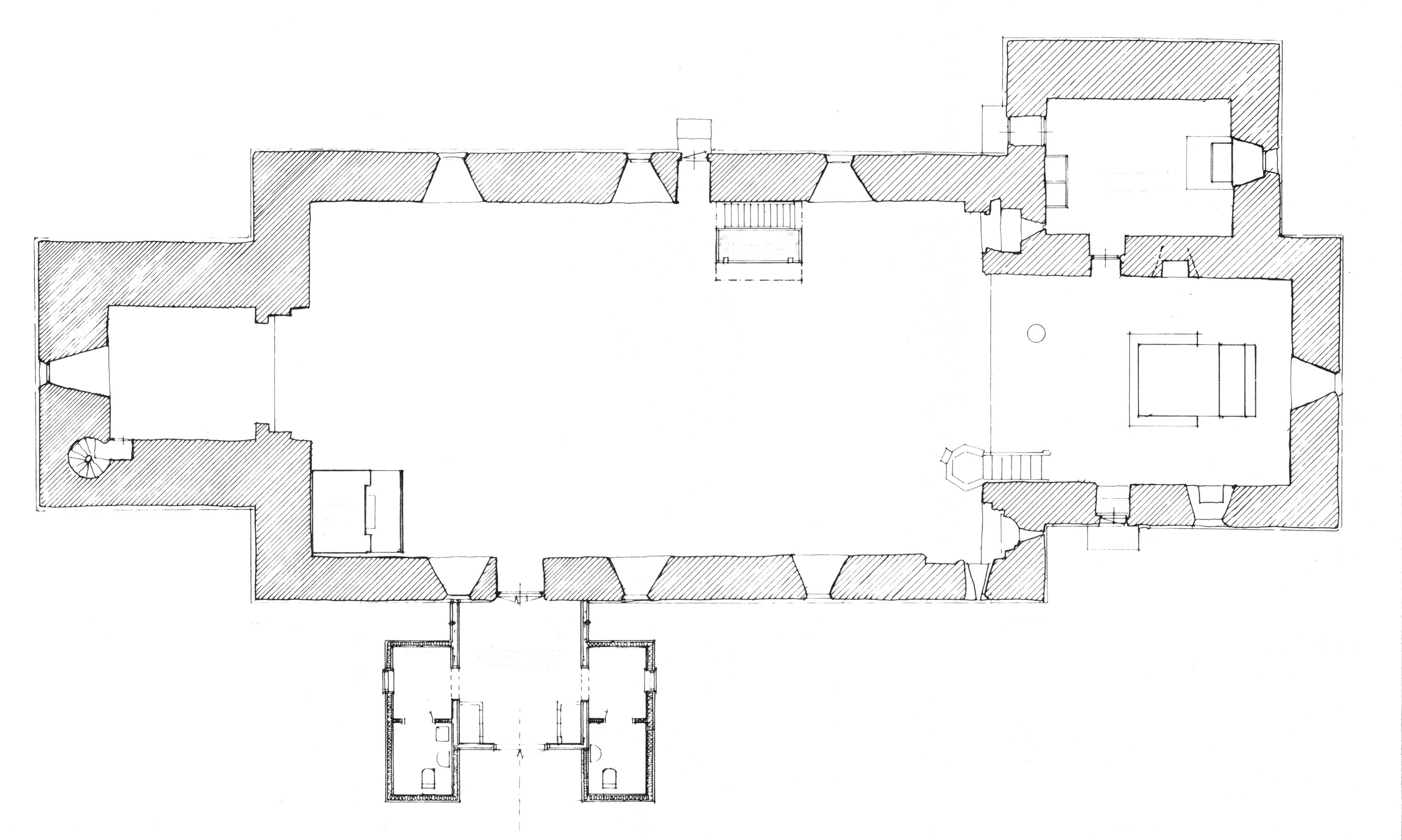

== See also ==
- List of churches in Nidaros
