= Gevingåsen Tunnel =

Railroad tunnel in Trøndelag, Norway

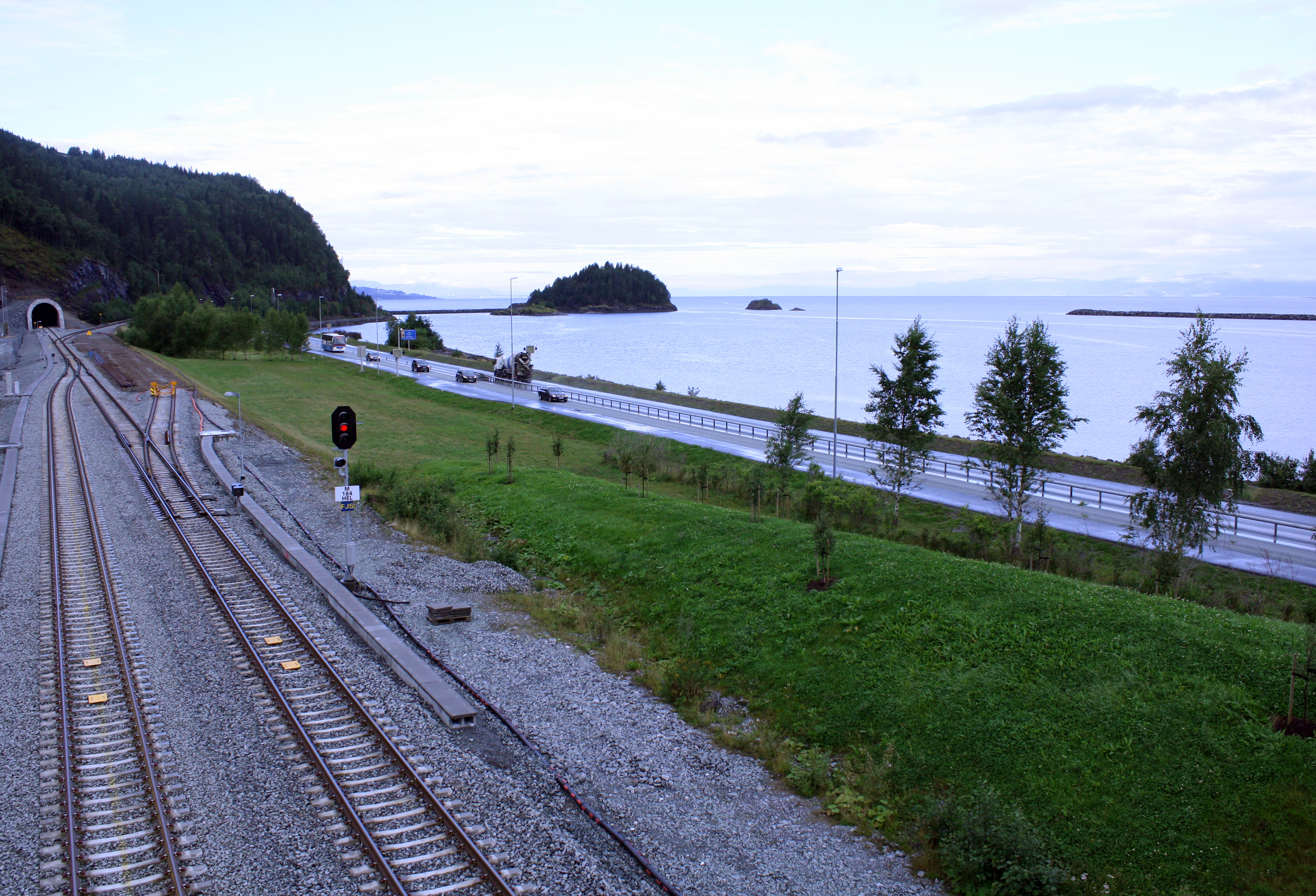
- Eastern entrance near Hell Station
- Interactive map of Gevingåsen Tunnel

Overview
- Line: Nordlandsbanen
- Location: Trøndelag, Norway
- Coordinates: 63°25′3″N 10°49′42″E
- Status: Operational
- System: Norwegian railways
- Start: Hommelvik
- End: Hell

Operation
- Opened: 15 August 2011
- Owner: Bane NOR
- Operator: Norwegian Railway Directorate
- Traffic: Rail

Technical
- Line length: 4.4 km (2.7 mi)
- No. of tracks: Single
- Track gauge: 1,435 mm (4 ft 8 1/2 in)
- Electrified: No

Gevingåsen Tunnel is a 4.4-kilometer (2.7 mi) single track railway tunnel between the villages of Hommelvik (in Malvik Municipality) and Hell (in Stjørdal Municipality) in Trøndelag county, Norway. The tunnel is located along the Nordland Line. Blasting started in 2009, and the tunnel opened on 15 August 2011, having cost 635 million kr. Built by the Norwegian National Rail Administration, the tunnel has shortened travel time southwest of Stjørdalshalsen by five minutes and increased the capacity of the Trondheim–Stjørdal to four trains per hour in each direction.

The tunnel was the first stage in a project to reduce travel time between Steinkjer and Trondheim to one hour. The tunnel section will not be suitable for high-speed trains, as it was built with curves with too small a diameter, notwithstanding political debate about both these tight curves and the possibility of double track. The whole project involved 5.7 kilometres (3.5 mi) of new tracks and permanent way. The blasted rock is used to build a new apron at Trondheim Airport, Værnes.

== Background ==
The tunnel was built between Hommelvik and Hell on the Nordland Line, through the hill Gevingåsen. The tunnel is 4.4 kilometers (2.7 mi) long, although the whole project consists of 5.7 kilometres (3.5 mi) of track. The tunnel carries a single track, reducing travel time by five minutes. It has also created the same distance between all passing loops between Trondheim and Stjørdal, allowing the capacity to increase from 5.4 to 8 trains per hour (both directions combined). The old right-of-way, located on a ledge over the sea and prone to landslides, is to be closed. In addition, 92 houses are projected to enjoy reduced noise pollution after the closing. Gevingsåsen was the first part of the plan to reduce rail travel time from Trondheim to Steinkjer to one hour. Politicians have suggested that after the tunnel is completed, they want to electrify the tracks from Trondheim to Steinkjer. The E6 motorway runs in a similar direction through Gevingåsen in the Hell Tunnel.

== Construction ==
Construction of the tunnel was done by drilling and blasting. During planning, use of a tunnel boring machine was considered, but the conventional drilling and blasting method was chosen because it was both cheaper and faster. At Hommelvik, the new section of track started at the river of Homla, where it runs in a curve towards the tunnel entrance at Solbakken. Just within the entrance, there is a pool and pump to collect surface water. A crosscut is located at Muruvik, close to the quarry. At this point, 275 meters (902 ft) into the tunnel, blasting was performed in both directions from the tunnel's interception with the crosscut. Muruvik also served as the operational hub; transport of the masses to the airport will run along the old E6. The third point of entry for blasting was at the entrance at Hell. The work include replacing the level crossing at Hell Station with an overpass.

The builder was the Norwegian National Rail Administration, and construction of the tunnel was financed through state funding, with the project costing 635 million kr. The construction was undertaken at the same time as Avinor was expanding the nearby Trondheim Airport, Værnes, and the spoil from the tunnel was used to build a new apron. Planning for the tunnel was completed at the end of 2008. The tender for construction was completed in March 2009, and won by Mika. The construction extracted 400,000 cubic metres (14,000,000 cu ft) of blasted rock, that was transported out of the tunnel. The last blast was detonated on 12 August 2010, completing the tunneling proper on time and on budget without injuries. The first revenue train ran through the tunnel on 15 August 2011. Because train schedules only change twice a year, the time saving was not accomplished until 2012. Further plans include building a second track at Trondheim Airport Station. Due to the capacity increase created by the tunnel, this will allow dedicated airport trains to operate from Trondheim.

== Controversy ==
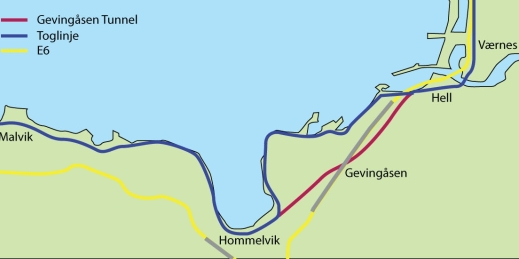
Map of Gevingåsen tunnel (purple), including the current Nordland Line (blue) and E6 (yellow)

The Trøndelag Council, an unofficial coordination council consisting of representatives from Nord-Trøndelag County Municipality, Sør-Trøndelag County Municipality and Trondheim Municipality, originally stated that they wanted a double-track tunnel. In 2006, the Norwegian National Rail Administration stated that it was not certain that a double-track in a single tunnel would meet European Union regulations, and that they might have to delay construction while looking into the matter. Costs for a double track would be about 50% higher than for a single track. Constructing a second barrel later for the a new track would cost as much as the first barrel. Trøndelag Council member Alf Daniel Moen (Labour) stated that the council abandoned the demand for a double-track tunnel so the airport expansion and tunnel construction could be coordinated and because there was not sufficient funding at the time to build both tracks.

The tunnel raised criticism for not being in line with the goals to build a high-speed railway in Trøndelag. This plan requires double track from Trondheim to Stjørdal, but such a solution through the tunnel has been disregarded. Norsk Bane, which is working on plans for a high-speed rail from Oslo to Steinkjer, has criticized the tunnel route for having curves that are too tight. With a radius of 320 metres (1,050 ft), this will only allow 110 kilometres per hour (68 mph) at Hommelvik Station and 60 kilometres per hour (37 mph) at Hell Station. So although the tunnel itself is straight enough to allow speeds of 210 kilometres per hour (130 mph), limitations at both ends of the tunnel will not allow trains to reach a higher maximum speed of 160 kilometres per hour (99 mph) and an average speed of more than 130 kilometres per hour (81 mph). Because of this, Gevingåsen Tunnel would not be able to allow high speeds, defined by parliament as minimum 250 kilometres per hour (160 mph), and could not be part of a future high-speed line north of Trondheim. Norsk Bane stated that part of the cause is that although the National Rail Administration has plans to build a high-speed line from Trondheim to Steinkjer, no complete plans, nor any plans for the trackage on either side of the tunnel, have been made.

In January 2009, just before construction commenced, the Nord-Trøndelag County Cabinet, fronted by Chair Alf Daniel Moen and Councilor of Transport Tor Erik Jensen (Conservative), stated that they did not want the tunnel to run along its planned route, but instead a less curved line that would allow it to be used as a high-speed line in the future. This was rejected by the Ministry of Transport and Communications, who stated that they were building a "modern railway for the future".
