= Meråker =

Meråker or Meraker may refer to:

== Places ==
- Meråker Municipality, a municipality in Trøndelag county, Norway
- Meråker (village), a village within Meråker Municipality in Trøndelag county, Norway
- Meråker Church, a church in Meråker Municipality in Trøndelag county, Norway
- Meråker Station, a railway station in Meråker Municipality in Trøndelag county, Norway

== Other ==
- Meråker Line, a railway line in Trøndelag county, Norway
- Meraker Brug, a Norwegian company which owns wilderness and forest in Trøndelag county
- IL Varden Meråker, a sports club based in Meråker Municipality in Trøndelag county, Norway
