= Elkem Meraker =

Smelting plant in Meråker, Norway

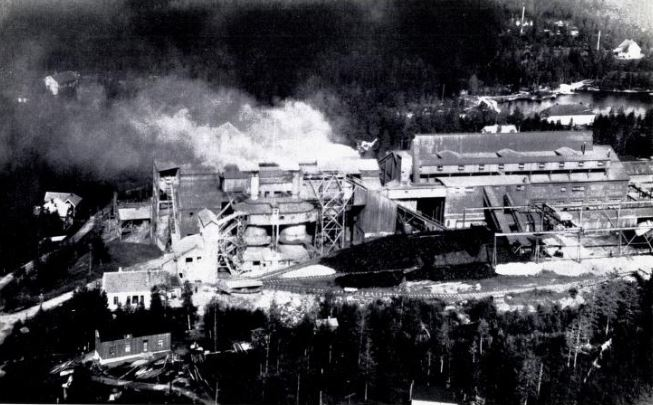
Meaker plant ca. 1957.

Elkem Meraker, formerly known as Meraker Smelteverk, was a microsilica plant located at Kopperå in Meråker Municipality, Norway. Products were transported along the Meråker Line to the port at Muruvik (in Malvik Municipality), where they were shipped abroad.

== History ==
The plant was established in 1898 to manufacture carbide, but later rebuilt to manufacture microsilica.

Influential manager from 1906 to 1928 was Iver Høy. At the time, the plant was owned by Meraker Brug. It was sold to Union Carbide in 1929.

In 1981, it was sold from Union Carbide to Elkem.

In autumn 2005, two of the three furnaces were shut down, before finally shutting down its last oven in May 2006. Around 100 employees lost their jobs while its production was largely replaced by Elkem Thamshavn.
