= Meråker train derailment =

1941 railway incident in Norway

Coordinates: 63°25′22″N 11°45′36″E

The Meråker train disaster occurred on 23 January 1941 at Meråker Station on the Meråker Line in Norway. A coke and coal train from Sweden lost its braking between the national border and Kopperå Station. The six back cars plus the caboose derailed just west of Kopperå, while the locomotive and 17 other cars continued their wild flight. The train derailed at Meråker Station, killing both the engineer and the stoker.
