= Hell Station =

Railway station in Hell, Norway

Hell Station Hell stasjon
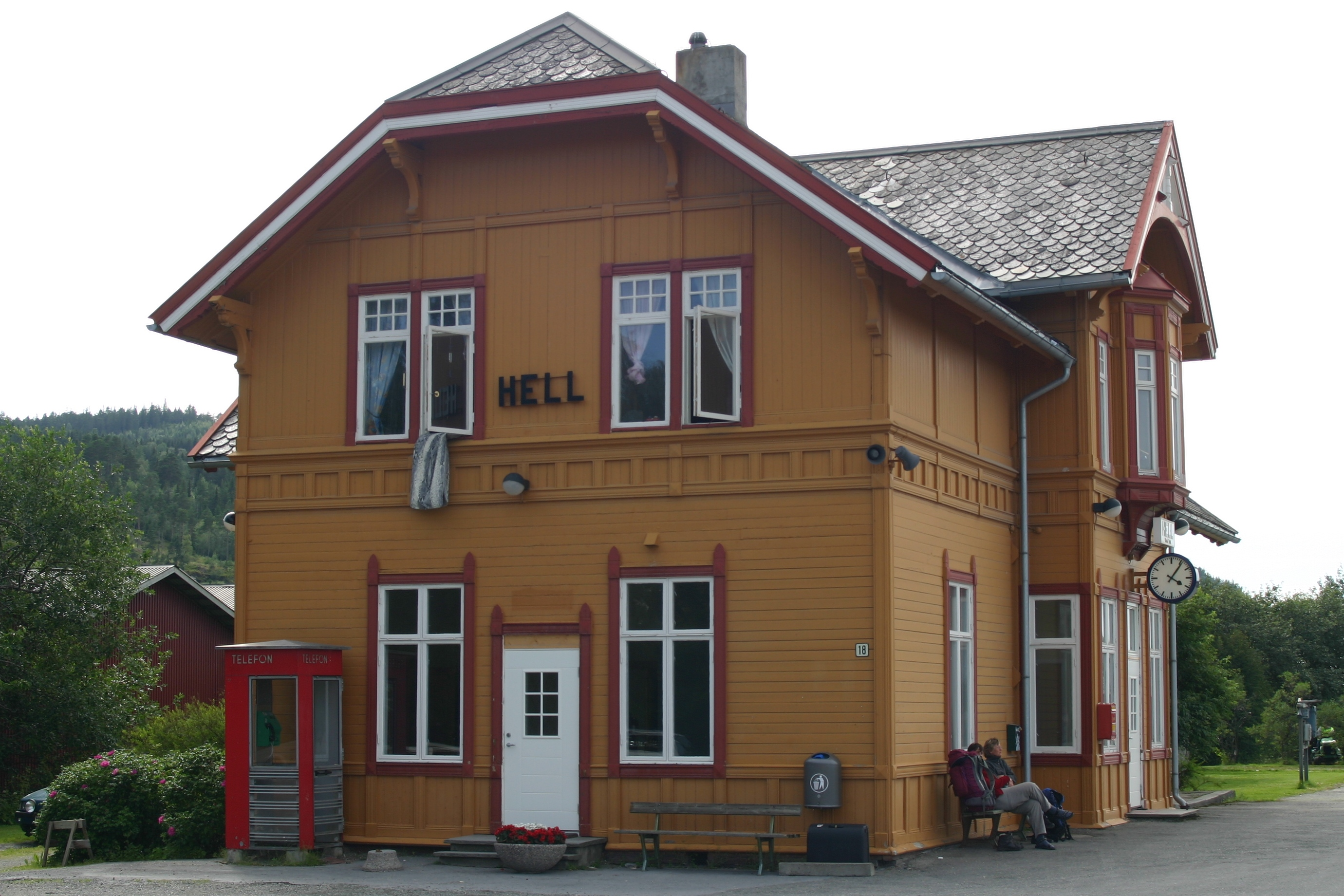
- View of the station

General information
- Location: Hell, Stjørdal Municipality; Trøndelag; Norway
- Coordinates: 63°26′46″N 10°53′55″E
- Elevation: 3.2 m (10 ft)
- System: Railway station
- Owner: Bane NOR
- Operator: SJ Norge
- Lines: Nordlandsbanen; Meråkerbanen
- Distance: 31.4 km (19.5 mi)
- Platforms: 3

Other information
- Station code: HEL

History
- Opened: 1881
Location
- Location within Trøndelag Location within Norway

Hell Station (Norwegian: Hell stasjon) is a railway station located in the village of Hell in Stjørdal Municipality in the Trøndelag county, Norway. It is located at the intersection of the Nordland Line and the Meråker Line.

== Information ==
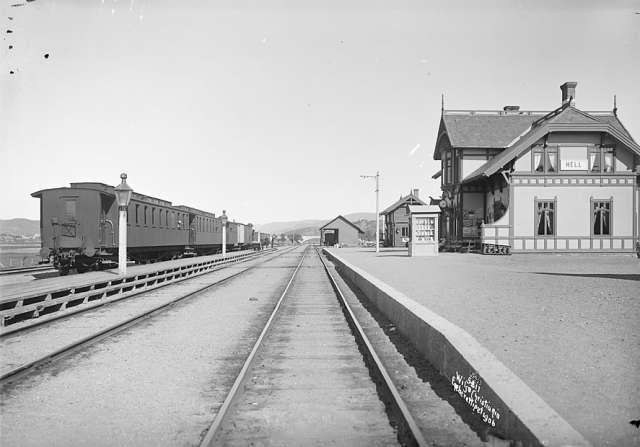
Steam trains in 1906. Photo: Anders Beer Wilse

Hell Station serves:

- the Meråker Line between the village Hell and Storlien (station) in Sweden.
- the Trøndelag Commuter Rail system

Both the Meråker line and the Trøndelag commuter rail used Class 92 units by SJ Norge. From 2021 on they got replaced by Class 76 bimodal (diesel + electric) trains. Since late 2025 they can run in electric mode in Hell due to the completion of the electrification of the Meråker Line.

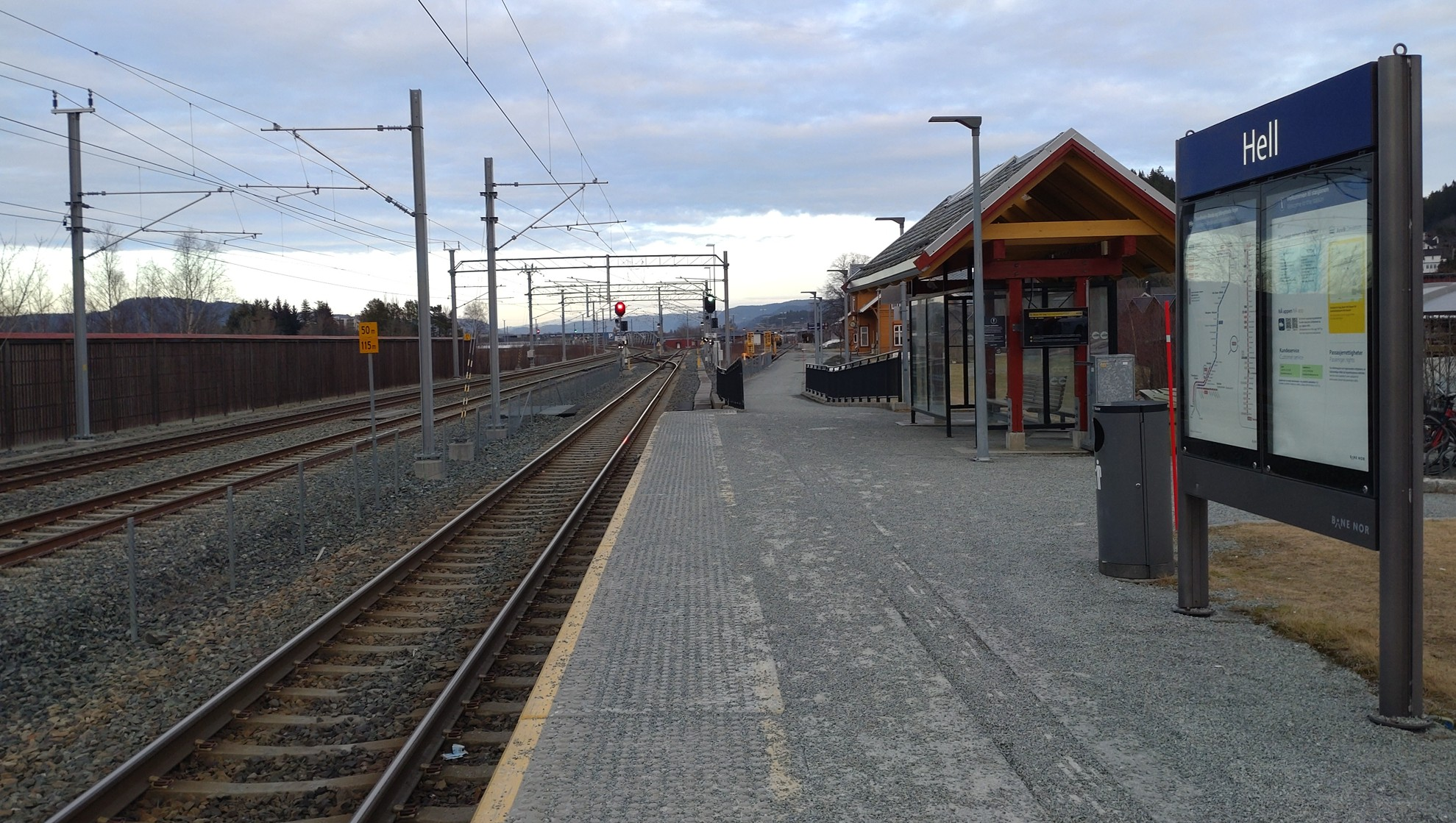
Passenger train stop and sliding tracks after electrification

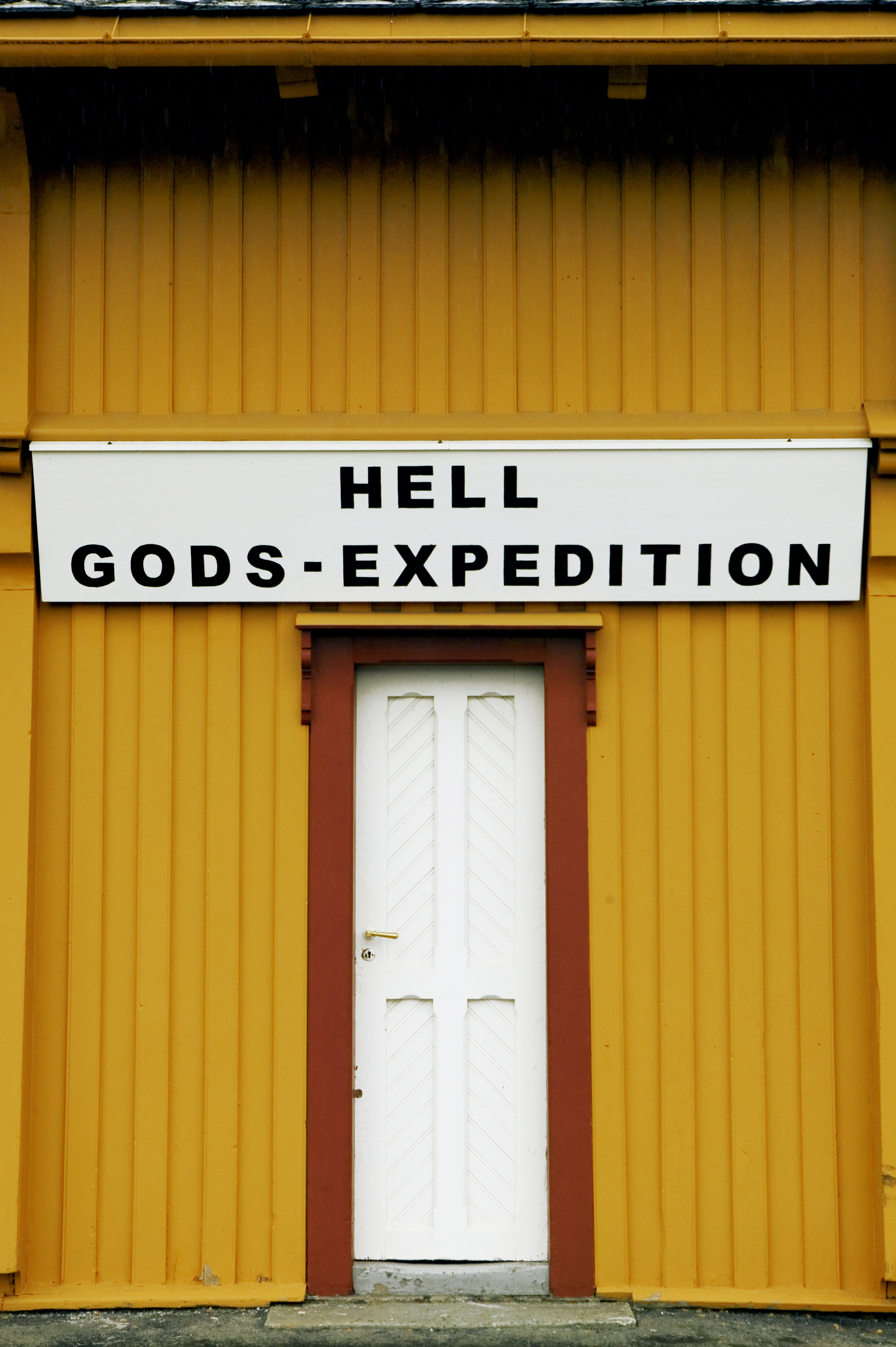
Hell Gods-Expedition. Photo: Karin Beate Nøsterud

== History ==
Planned by architect Paul Armin Due, the present station building at Hell Station was opened in 1902. It replaced an older building of 1881, whose architect was Peter Andreas Blix.

The small restaurant inside the station was taken over by Norsk Spisevognselskap on 1 October 1922, but returned to private operation in 1934.

== Tourist attraction ==
Due to its name, Hell Station has become a tourist attraction. While associated with the religious concept Hell by English-speakers, the name Hell derives from Old Norse hellir, which means cave. The Norwegian equivalent to English hell is hel or, more commonly, helvete (compare with Old English hellewīte).

The station's freight building still bears the old sign saying Hell Gods-Expedition. In Norwegian, Gods-Expedition (archaic) or godsekspedisjon (modern) means freight service or cargo handling. This sign is a popular photo opportunity for foreign English-speaking tourists. Especially in the summer months, it is not unusual for foreigners, when discovering the sign, to disembark the train in order to get a photo. The building is not used for freight anymore. All light freight is handled through post offices or competing companies.

Preceding station	Regional trains	Following station
Hommelvik towards Trondheim S	R71	Hegra towards Storlien
Preceding station	Local trains	Following station
Hommelvik	Trøndelag Commuter Rail	Trondheim Airport
