= Hegra Station =

Railway station in Stjørdal, Norway

Hegra Station Hegra stasjon
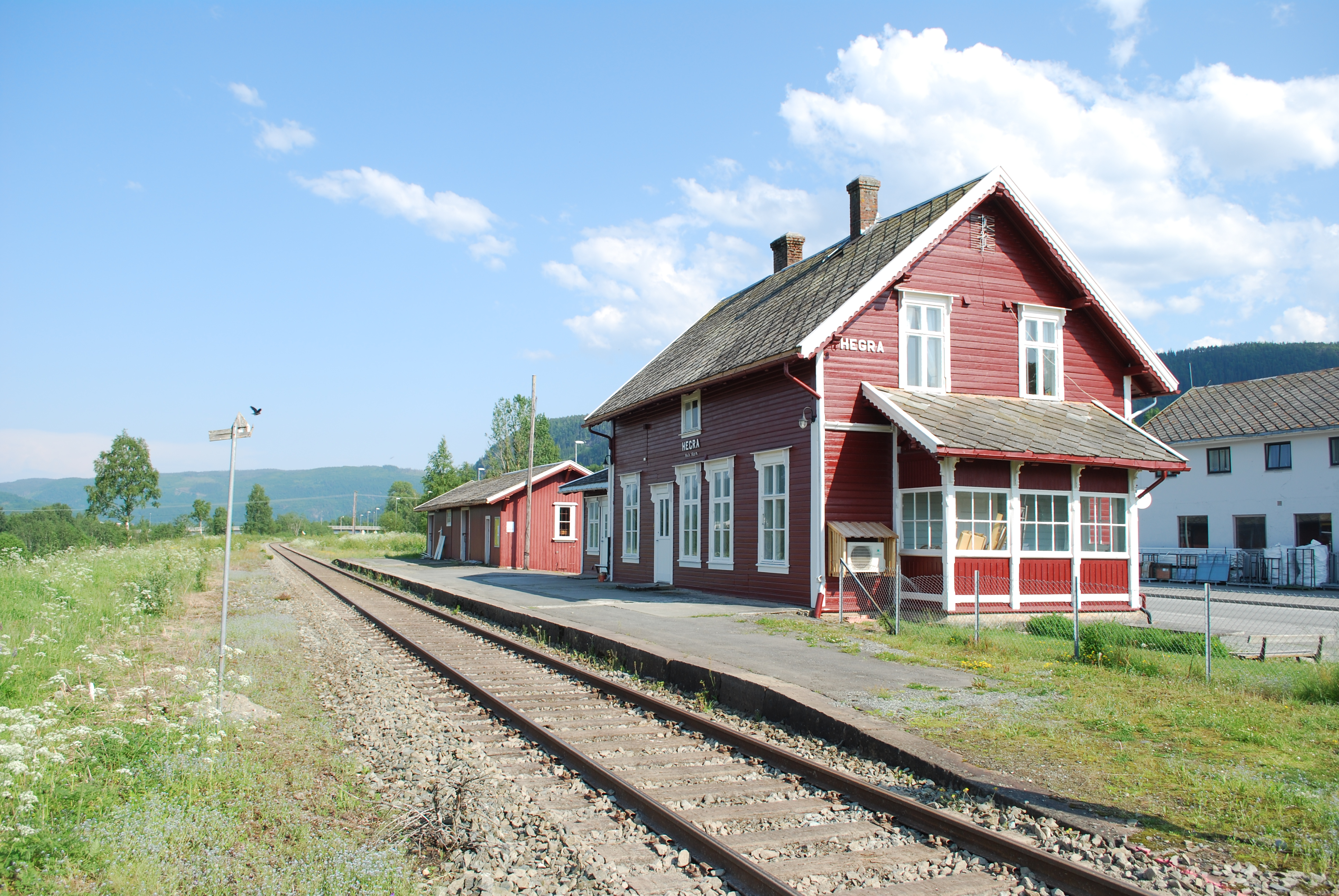
- View of the station

General information
- Location: Hegra, Stjørdal Municipality; Trøndelag; Norway
- Coordinates: 63.46109°N 11.107945°E
- Elevation: 18.2 metres (60 ft)
- System: Railway station
- Owner: Bane NOR
- Operator: SJ Norge
- Line: Meråkerbanen
- Distance: 42.20 kilometres (26.22 mi)
- Platforms: 1

History
- Opened: 17 October 1881
Location
- Location within Trøndelag Location within Norway

Hegra Station (Norwegian: Hegra stasjon) is a railway station on the Meråker Line in the village of Hegra in the Stjørdal Municipality in Trøndelag county, Norway. The station was opened on 17 October 1881 as Hegre. It received the current name on 1 June 1919, and has been unstaffed since 1 March 1971.

It is served twice a day in each direction by SJ Norge. The station is located about 42 kilometres (26 mi) from Trondheim and it sits at an elevation of 18.2 metres (60 ft) above sea level.

Preceding station	Regional trains	Following station
Hell towards Trondheim S	R71	Gudå towards Storlien
