= Iver Høy =

Norwegian businessperson

Iver Hesselberg Høy (26 September 1877 – 8 March 1943) was a Norwegian businessperson.

He was born in Langesund as a son of shipmaster Christian Høy (1836–1896) and Karen Elise Wright. In December 1902 he married ship captain's daughter Lille Petersen. Their daughter Cathrine married professor of medicine Erik Poppe.

He took his education at Horten Technical School in 1897 and in Germany from 1899 to 1906. He was the manager of Meraker Smelteverk from 1906 to 1918. The factory was owned by Meraker Brug and the Kiær family, and Iver Høy was tasked with coordinating Meraker Smelteverk with other power-demanding industries. It was coordinated with Hafslund Karbidfabrikk in 1919, and Høy became manager there. When Odda Smelteverk was created in 1924, Høy was manager there too. The three companies operated as one party, among others in international syndicate negotiations. Høy was a vice president of the International Carbide Syndicate.

In 1928, Meraker Smelteverk was sold to an American company. In 1937, Odda Smelteverk was sold to a British company. Høy continued to have a coordinating role. From 1928 to 1943, his main role was the chairmanship in De Norske Exportnæringers Landsforbund. He was also a supervisory council member of Forsikringsaktieselskabet Norden. He died suddenly, in March 1943 in Oslo.
