= Hell, Norway =

Village in Trøndelag county, Norway

Hell
- Village
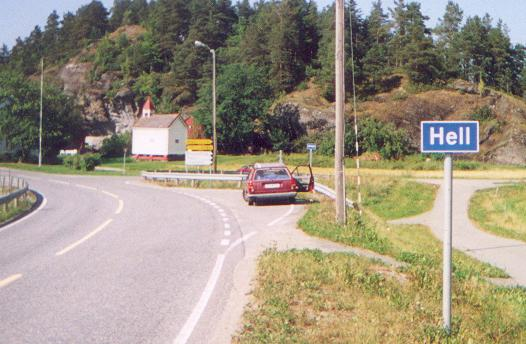
- Road sign on the road to Hell
- Interactive map of Hell
- Location within Trøndelag Location within Norway
- Coordinates: 63.4444°N 10.9227°E
- Country: Norway
- Region: Central Norway
- County: Trøndelag
- District: Stjørdalen
- Municipality: Stjørdal Municipality

Area
  - Total: 1.26 km^{2} (0.49 sq mi)
- Elevation: 14 m (46 ft)

Population (2023)
  - Total: 1,921
  - Density: 1,525/km^{2} (3,950/sq mi)
- Time zone: UTC+01:00 (CET)
  - Summer (DST): UTC+02:00 (CEST)
- Post Code: 7517 Hell

Hell (Urban East Norwegian: [ˈhɛlː], Trøndersk: [ˈheʎ]) is a village in Stjørdal Municipality in Trøndelag county, Norway. It lies at the foot of the valley of Stjørdalen, where the Stjørdalselva empties into the Trondheim Fjord, about 3 kilometres (2 mi) south of the town of Stjørdalshalsen. The 1.26-square-kilometre (310-acre) village had a population of 1,921 in 2023, with a population density of 1,525 inhabitants per square kilometre (3,950/sq mi).

Hell is a post town with two post codes: 7517 for delivery route addresses and 7570 for post-office boxes. Hell currently has a grocery store, gas station, a fast food shop, and a retirement home. Until late 1995, the E6 highway bisected the village before proceeding across the bridge of Hell to Sandfærhus (the site of Trondheim Airport). The new highway (completed in 1995) goes around the village.

== Name ==
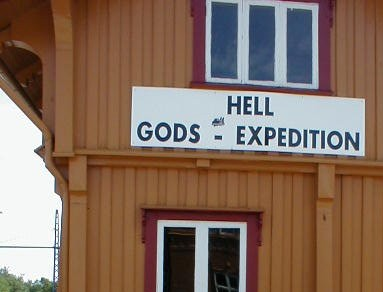
Sign at Hell railway station, reading gods-expedition (i.e. "goods handling")

The name Hell derives from the Old Norse word hellir, meaning "cliff cave" or "shelter under an overhanging rock".

The village has become a minor tourist attraction because of the name's coincidence with the English word "hell", and visitors often have their photograph taken in front of the station sign. Temperatures in Hell can reach −25 °C (−13 °F) during winter. Among English-speaking tourists, popular postcards depict the station with a heavy frost on the ground, making a visual joke about "Hell frozen over".

British punk band The Boys recorded their third album in the village, and as a result named it To Hell with the Boys.

== Climate ==
Trondheim Airport Værnes is used as the official meteorological office for this region. Temperatures in both winter and summer are moderate due to the geography of the location: the average January highs are still above freezing despite high latitude. Hell has a humid continental climate that is close to being subarctic and also close to being oceanic.

Climate data for Trondheim Airport Værnes 1981–2010 (12 m, 63°27′N 10°55′E, extremes 1946–2016)
Month	Jan	Feb	Mar	Apr	May	Jun	Jul	Aug	Sep	Oct	Nov	Dec	Year
Record high °C (°F)	13.7 (56.7)	13.8 (56.8)	15.7 (60.3)	23.3 (73.9)	27.9 (82.2)	31.7 (89.1)	33.5 (92.3)	31.3 (88.3)	27.9 (82.2)	22.1 (71.8)	16.1 (61.0)	13.1 (55.6)	33.5 (92.3)
Mean daily maximum °C (°F)	1.3 (34.3)	1.8 (35.2)	4.4 (39.9)	8.9 (48.0)	13.9 (57.0)	16.7 (62.1)	19.4 (66.9)	18.5 (65.3)	14.5 (58.1)	9.3 (48.7)	4.3 (39.7)	1.8 (35.2)	9.6 (49.2)
Daily mean °C (°F)	−1.8 (28.8)	−1.4 (29.5)	1.1 (34.0)	5.1 (41.2)	9.6 (49.3)	12.8 (55.0)	15.3 (59.5)	14.6 (58.3)	11 (52)	6.3 (43.3)	1.5 (34.7)	−1.3 (29.7)	6.1 (42.9)
Mean daily minimum °C (°F)	−5 (23)	−4.5 (23.9)	−2.3 (27.9)	1.3 (34.3)	5.3 (41.5)	8.8 (47.8)	11.2 (52.2)	10.7 (51.3)	7.4 (45.3)	3.2 (37.8)	−1.3 (29.7)	−4.4 (24.1)	2.5 (36.6)
Record low °C (°F)	−25.6 (−14.1)	−25.5 (−13.9)	−23 (−9)	−13.9 (7.0)	−4.7 (23.5)	−0.2 (31.6)	2.3 (36.1)	−0.3 (31.5)	−4.9 (23.2)	−10.8 (12.6)	−19 (−2)	−23.5 (−10.3)	−25.6 (−14.1)
Average precipitation mm (inches)	74.7 (2.94)	64.7 (2.55)	54.2 (2.13)	44.4 (1.75)	55.3 (2.18)	69.6 (2.74)	87.4 (3.44)	91.8 (3.61)	94.1 (3.70)	83.6 (3.29)	69.4 (2.73)	82 (3.2)	871.2 (34.26)
Average precipitation days (≥ 1.0 mm)	13	12	12	10	11	12	12	13	14	14	12	14	149
Source 1: Meteo climat stats
Source 2: eKlima/met.no

== Amenities ==
Hell railway station is situated at a railway junction where the Nordland Line north to Bodø branches off from the Meråkerbanen between Trondheim and Storlien, Sweden. Hell Station is currently a staffed railway station.

The Hell Kjøpesenter mall is located at Sandfærhus north of the Stjørdalselva river, rather than in Hell, and thus the name is a misnomer.

A blues festival takes place every year at Hell Station in September, "Blues in Hell". The original festival (Hell Blues Festival) started in 1992, then changed its name to Hell Music Festival in 2006 to open their doors for music other than blues. The Hell Music Festival in 2007 failed to attract many concert-goers, however, and the festival declared bankruptcy the same year. In 2008, a new festival was started, entitled "Blues in Hell", going back to the original concept.

Since 2011, the circuit in the village has hosted a round of the FIA European Rallycross Championship (and from 2014 the FIA World Rallycross Championship).

== Notable person ==
Mona Grudt, Miss Norway 1990 and Miss Universe 1990, is from a small village near Hell. During the 1990 Miss Universe competition, she listed herself as "The beauty queen from Hell" as a publicity stunt.

== See also ==
- Hell, Michigan
- List of places with unusual names
