= Erik Poppe (physician) =

Norwegian professor

Erik Poppe (3 April 1905 – 4 November 1997) was a Norwegian professor of medicine, specializing in oncology, radiation therapy and similar subjects.

== Early life and career ==
He was born in Kristiania as the son of tramway director Trygve Poppe. He finished his secondary education in 1923, took the cand.med. degree at the Royal Frederick University in 1930 and the dr.med. degree in 1942 with the thesis Experimental Investigations of the Effects of Roentgen Rays in the Eye. He was a chief physician at Tromsø Hospital before becoming chief physician at the Norwegian Radium Hospital from 1954 to 1975. He was also appointed as a docent at the University of Oslo in 1954, and promoted to professor in 1962. He was a fellow of the Norwegian Academy of Science and Letters from 1972 and was decorated as a Knight, First Class of the Order of St. Olav in 1977.

== Personal life and death ==
He was married to Cathrine Høy, a daughter of Iver Høy. They resided in Oslo, had two daughters and two sons. He died in November 1997 and was buried at Vår Frelsers gravlund.
