= Meråker Line =

Railway line in Trøndelag, Norway

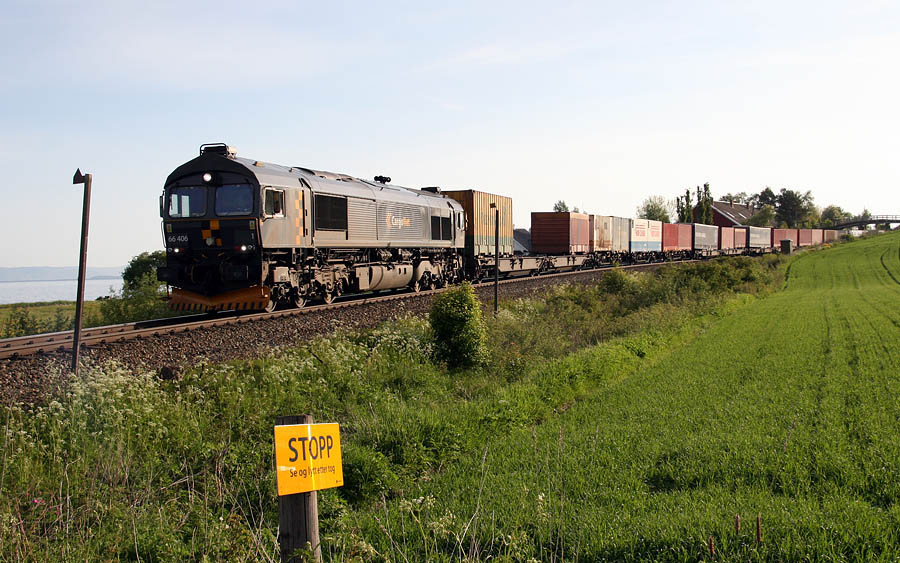
- Container train hauled by a CD66 locomotive from CargoNet in Malvik Municipality

Overview
- Native name: Meråkerbanen
- Owner: Bane NOR
- Termini: Trondheim Central Station; Storlien Station
- Stations: 6

Service
- Type: Railway
- System: Norwegian Railway
- Operator(s): SJ Norge; CargoNet
- Rolling stock: Class 76

History
- Opened: 22 July 1882

Technical
- Line length: 70 km (43 mi)
- Number of tracks: Single
- Character: Regional trains Freight
- Track gauge: 1,435 mm (4 ft 8 1/2 in)
- Electrification: Yes
- Operating speed: 100 km/h (62 mph)

The Meråker Line (Norwegian: Meråkerbanen [ˈmeːroːkərˌbɑːnən]) is a 72-kilometer (45 mi) railway line which runs through the district and valley of Stjørdalen in Trøndelag county, Norway. The line branches off from the Nordland Line at Hell Station and runs eastwards to the Norway–Sweden border, with Storlien Station acting as the border station. From there, the line continues as the Central Line. Traditionally, the Meråker Line was regarded as the whole line from Trondheim Central Station to the border, a distance of 102 kilometers (63 mi). There are two daily passenger train services operated by SJ Norge and a limited number of freight trains hauling lumber and wood chippings.

The line underwent electrification in the early 2020's, which was completed in 2025.

== Route ==
The Meråker Line is defined as the section between Hell and the Norway–Sweden border at Storlien. Until 2008, it was regarded as the entire section from Trondheim Central Station to Storlien. The line was initially 102.23 kilometers (63.52 mi) to the border, or 105.97 kilometers (65.85 mi) to Storlien Station. With the new definition, the line is 70.69 kilometers (43.92 mi). The national border is 655.10 kilometers (407.06 mi) from Oslo Central Station and 751.67 kilometers (467.07 mi) from Stockholm Central Station. At Leangen Station the Stavne–Leangen Line branches off and provides a bypass through Trondheim. At Hell the Nordland Line continues northwards. From Storlien the line continues as the Centre Line via Östersund to Sundsvall.

The line largely follows the coast of the Trondheimsfjord from Trondheim until reaching Hell. From there the line heads inland through the valley of Stjørdalen, initially following the river of Stjørdalselva. The line runs predominantly due east from Trondheim, passing through the current municipalities of Trondheim, Malvik, Stjørdal and Meråker. With the new definition, it only passes through the latter two and is entirely located within Trøndelag county. From Trondheim to Hell, the line runs just above sea level, except past Leangen Station, where the line hits 34-meter (112 ft) above mean sea level. From Hegra Station there is again a slight rise. The 72 kilometers (45 mi) from Trondheim to Gudå Station remain fairly flat. From there, the line enters a steep climb, passing Meråker Station at an elevation of 220 meters (720 ft) above mean sea level and Kopperå Station at 329 meters (1,079 ft). Storlien is located at 593 meters (1,946 ft) above sea level. The Meråker Line lacks centralized traffic control, but is equipped with GSM-R. The standard gauge railway is owned and operated by the Norwegian National Rail Administration.

=== Stations ===
- Hell Station
- Hegra Station
- Gudå Station
- Meråker Station
- Kopperå Station
- (Storlien Station located along the Swedish Central Line)

== History ==
Proposals for a railway were first made in 1870. Routes via Verdal Municipality and Røros Municipality were soon discarded, and the Meråker Line was approved on 5 June 1873. The first revenue services ran in 1879, and the line was officially opened on 22 July 1882. The line boosted the local economy, allowing for same-day transport of produce to Trondheim. The line has been upgraded several times to increase the axle load. During World War II, the line was the scene of both the Hommelvik train collision and the Meråker train derailment. Steam trains were in use until 1971, following the introduction of diesel locomotives in 1961. From 1900 to 2005, Meraker Smelteverk was a significant customer, using the line to haul carbide, and later microsilica, from their mill at Kopperå to the port at Muruvik.

=== Background ===
Since the Middle Ages, both the Stjørdalen and Verdal valleys were important trade routes connecting Trøndelag and Jämtland. In particular, Levanger grew into an important trading town for Jämtland farmers, who would travel across the Verdal Mountains. The first public discussion of a railway was launched in Levanger in 1858; the initiative was pushed by Jämtland's governor Thome, who proposed a line via Verdal to Levanger. At the time, the Trondhjem–Støren Line was about to be built, and the commercial interests in Trondheim were more concerned with a southward connection along what would become the Røros Line to Oslo. An 1869 meeting in Sundsvall, Sweden, had proposed three routes for the line: via Verdal, via Meråker or as a branch from Røros.

A road up Stjørdalen was built during the 1850s, connecting at Stjørdalshalsen to a steam ship service to Trondheim. A concern in Sweden was that Bottenviken could freeze up and that the Trondheimsfjord offered an ice-free alternative for export of timber. Trade from Norway to Sweden was limited, mostly due to the limited infrastructure. Norwegian trades argued that a railway would allow for the export of Norwegian fish to Sweden.

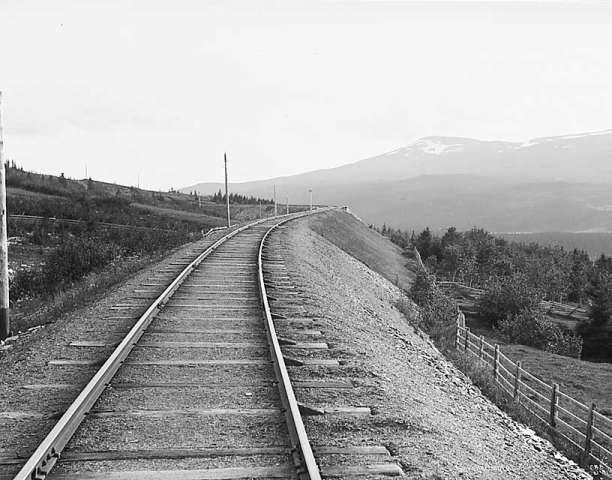
The Meråker Line in Meråker during the 1880s

A committee was appointed in 1870 to consider the railway, and was followed by on-site investigations to determine the railway's route. Similar investigations were carried out in Sweden. For the Norwegian side, costs were estimated to be at 4.7 million Norwegian kroner. Until 1875, Norway used the specidaler. Surveys along the Verdal route deemed it unsuitable. These studies presumed a narrow gauge (1,067 millimetres or 42.0 inches) railway, common in Norway at the time. Operating profits were estimated to give a 4.5 percent return on capital. Shares in the railway company were offered for sale in 1871; the largest purchaser was Trondheim Municipality, who bought shares for 1.2 million kroner. In Trondheim alone, private investors bought an additional 3.6 million kroner in shares.

In the spring of 1871, the Standing Committee for Railways considered the line in the Parliament of Norway. The proposition failed 64-42. After establishing a local railway committee, Parliament passed legislation to build the line on 2 May 1872. The state would receive shares in the company equal to their monetary contribution. A suggestion from Johan Sverdrup that required the company to borrow 1.4 million kroner failed 58-52. In Sweden, the work was meeting resistance, and many Trondheim businessmen chose to purchase shares in the Swedish part of the line to secure the financing of the Swedish part. In 1873, the Parliament of Sweden voted to build a narrow gauge railway from Torpshammar to the Norwegian border; there was already a railway line from Torpshammar to Sundsvall, the Sundsvall–Torpshammars Railway.

The Norwegian Parliament gave 400,000 kr in support in 1873 and doubled it the following year. By then, the Swedish authorities had decided that all railways should be built in standard gauge, and the Norwegian Parliament chose to change their configuration to the same gauge in 1874, increasing estimated costs from 4.7 million kr to 8.9 million kr. This was a similar arrangement to what would happen with the two international lines in Eastern Norway, where the Kongsvinger and Østfold Lines were also built with standard gauge. Despite intense lobbying from representatives from Innherred, the Verdal alternative was finally discarded when parliament gave 3 million kr to the Meråker Line.

=== Construction ===
The choice of route through Stjørdal remained a controversy. The Stjørdalselva river created a barrier just north of Hell, making it cheaper to build the line on the south shore of the river until Hegra. This would make the line bypass Stjørdalshalsen on the north shore, the largest town between Trondheim and Östersund. Despite massive local protests, Parliament ultimately chose the southern alternative. The added distance reduced Stjørdalshalsen's trade role while reducing railway revenue as the steamships continued to run on the route, thus reducing the line's profitability. Stjørdalselva Bridge was opened in 1902 when the Hell–Sunnan Line opened to Stjørdal.

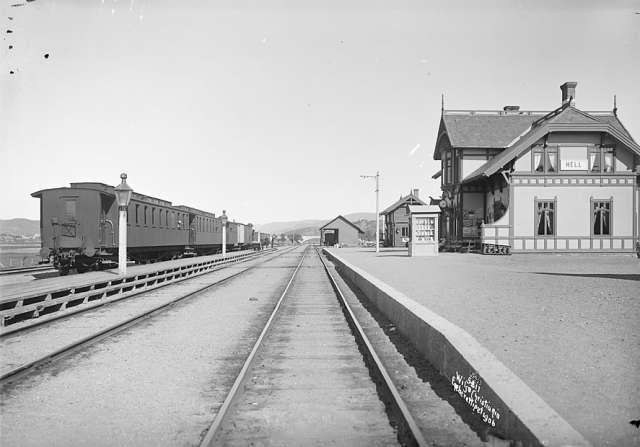
Hell Station in 1906

Blasting commenced during a ceremony in 1875, although regular construction work on the line did not commence until the following year. The immediate line into Trondheim was the last to start, in 1878, following disagreements about the plans. By then 54 kilometers (34 mi) of track was laid from Leangen Station to the border between the municipalities of Nedre Stjørdal Municipality and Øvre Stjørdal Municipality. The first train ran from Rotvoll Station, just outside Trondheim, to the international border on 27 August 1879. Starting on 11 February 1880, a weekly train service was operated, and regular revenue services began on 17 October 1881, although the line was not yet completed to Östersund.

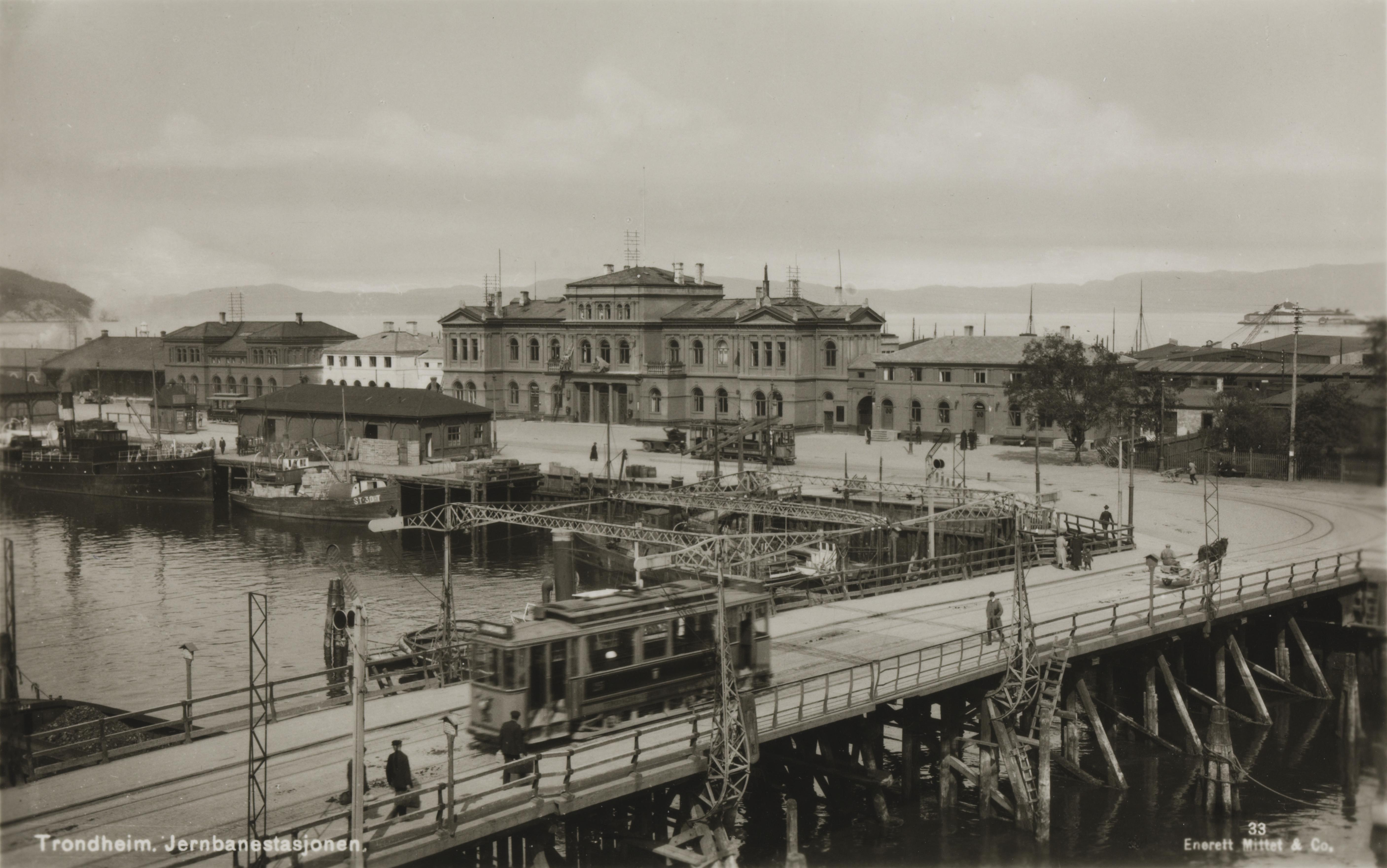
Trondheim Central Station during the 1920

In Trondheim, the existing railway station for the Trondhjem–Støren Line was built as a cul-de-sac station at Kalvskinnet. This could not serve the Meråker Line and the station was thus moved to Brattøra, an artificial peninsula immediately north of the city center. Thus the station became located next to the new port facility. With the construction of the Røros Line, it was decided to connect both lines to the same station. The new station cost was 1.4 million kroner. Trondheim Station did not open until 1882.

The work paid well and attracted many navvies to the area. Initial wages were 3.20 kroner per day, though this later was reduced. Two and a half thousand men were employed, with fewer jobs being offered than there were applicants. The landowners were compensated 50–200 kroner per hectare (NOK 20–80 per acre) for cultivated land and 10 kroner per hectare (NOK 4 per acre) for forest. Many local farmers made good money offering cargo transport for the construction and renting out annexes for navvies; others made money as traders. As with all such construction areas, many legal and illegal pubs and brothels were established. After construction, some moved on, while others settled in the area; many received jobs with the railway company.

The official opening occurred on 22 July 1882 by King Oscar II of Sweden and Norway. This was during the height of the debate on parliamentarianism. The king's right to veto the Parliament of Norway, and the king used the opening ceremonies and speeches at each station to encourage people to support the union between Sweden and Norway and pointed out how the railway would better connect the "brother nations." In contrast, in Hegra no one from the municipal council chose to attend the opening ceremony, and no one from Nedre Stjørdal attended the opening at Hell either.

=== The first years ===
By 1880 the railway had six locomotives at its disposal. No. 1–2 were Class 14 that were intended as helping power to get trains up the steep climb from Gudå to Storlien. No. 3–6 were Class 9 locomotives that would do the main haulage from Gudå into Trondheim. In 1883, NSB's other two Class 14 locomotives were transferred from the Smaalenene Line. The initial fleet consisted of 24 passenger and nine breaking cars, all from Skabo. The line featured the country's first bogie cars, with a single entrance at the end of each car, instead of individual doors for each compartment. There were also 37 closed freight cars, 40 lumber cars, 20 boxcars, 100 flatcars and three milk cars. At first all trains were mixed freight and passenger.

In addition to the trains heading for Sweden, there was also a commuter train that ran first from Hommelvik Station, then from Hegra Station, into Trondheim in the morning, and returning after work in the evening. Since there was no depot at Hegra, the locomotive had to return without cars to Hommelvik for the nightly overhaul. The 854 kilometers (531 mi) route from Trondheim to Stockholm initially took 57 hours. By 1904, this was reduced to 26 hours, mostly due to reducing the layover between trains.

The Røros Line was connected to the station at Brattøra on 24 June 1884, allowing Marienborg to be us as a common maintenance depot for both lines. The Meråker Line's locomotives were then renumbered at 51 to keep them distinguished from the Røros Line's. The Meråker Line was assigned two Class 8 locomotives in the same year. From 1896, Class 15 locomotives were used, and two years later, supplemented by the Class 17.

The line's revenue was 533,306 kroner per year in 1900, most of which was from freight traffic. This gave a return of capital of 1–2%. Freight traffic increased about twice as fast as passenger traffic, and in 1904 a new daily train was put into service to Storlien. The first Hell–Sunnan Line opened in stages between 1902 and 1905. At first, the trains along the Hell–Sunnan Line were decoupled at Hell Station, but in 1909 direct trains to Trondheim started operating.

=== Impact ===
The Meråker Line was of great economic and social importance for the villages it passed through. It allowed much quicker transport into Trondheim, and the station buildings became centers of community life. For the first time, these places had telegraph stations and daily post deliveries. The expedient transport meant that many more people chose to travel into Trondheim, which gained an advantage over other towns, such as Levanger and Stjørdalshalsen, in becoming the regional center for trade. Due to this, Stjørdalshalsen lost much of its importance for the villages in the Stjørdalen valley. The railway allowed farmers to sell fresh dairy products to Trondheim and Sundsvall. New markets, combined with good income during construction that allowed for investments in machinery, increased the revenue and profits for agriculture along the line. By 1900, 68 people were employed by the railway in Meråker alone.

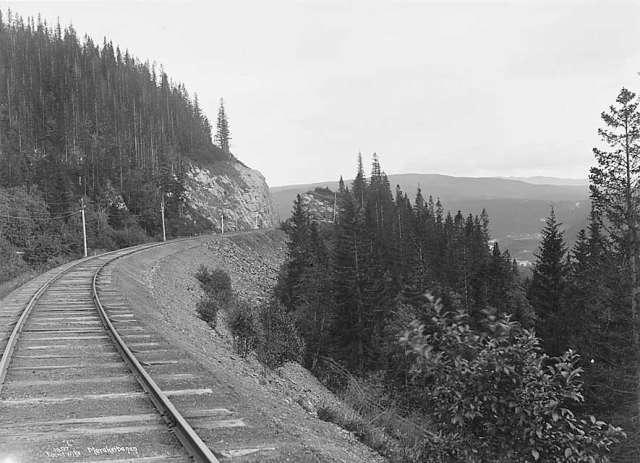
The Meråker Line through Meråker in the 1880s

Storlien, located on the Swedish side of the border, flourished as a resort, with the first hotel established soon after the railway arrived. Trade between the two countries increased as Jämtland had easy access to the Trøndelag market. However, the freight rates were so high that it was cheaper to send some products to Trøndelag from the Swedish east coast by ship around Scania.

Meråker saw an industrial boom due to the railway. There was already a copper mine and smelters at Kopperå, and they saw the railway as a possibility to change from locally produced charcoal to imported coke. A pulp mill opened in 1887, but burned down in 1912. The most important industry was the carbide factory that opened in Kopperå in 1900—Meraker Smelteverk. Though located close to the hydroelectricity sources in Meråker, the import and export of raw and finished materials would not have been possible without the railway. A port for the plant was built at Muruvik in 1918.

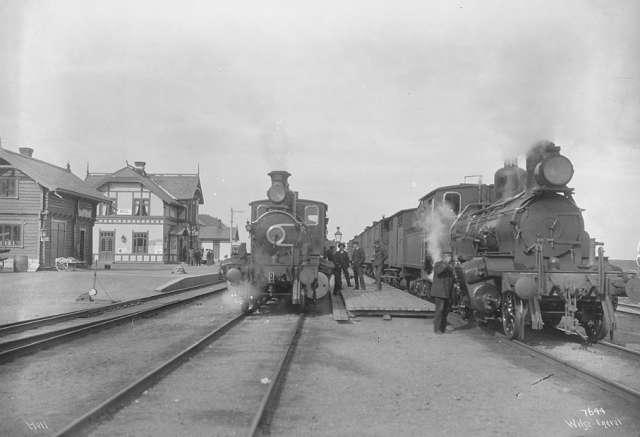
Two steam locomotives meet at Hell Station in 1907

Lumber export was one of the main driving forces for building railways then, and the Meråker Line was no exception. In both Stjørdalen and the vast areas of Jämtland and Northern Sweden are huge amounts of woodlands. The Meråker Line ran straight through this area, and was seen as a new possibility to export lumber to the continent, where there was high demand for it. Before the railway was built, a small sawmill was in Hommelvik. In 1881, the Scotsman Lewis Miller bought vast areas of woods in Jämtland and nine sawmills in Sweden. All these produce were then sent to Hommelvik for processing and shipment. At the height, he employed 100 men and exported up to 183,000,000 m^{3} (6.5×10^{9} cu ft) of lumber each year. The port of Hommelvik was the location for two wharves owned by NSB and major coal imports for the Swedish State Railways.

=== World War I and beyond ===
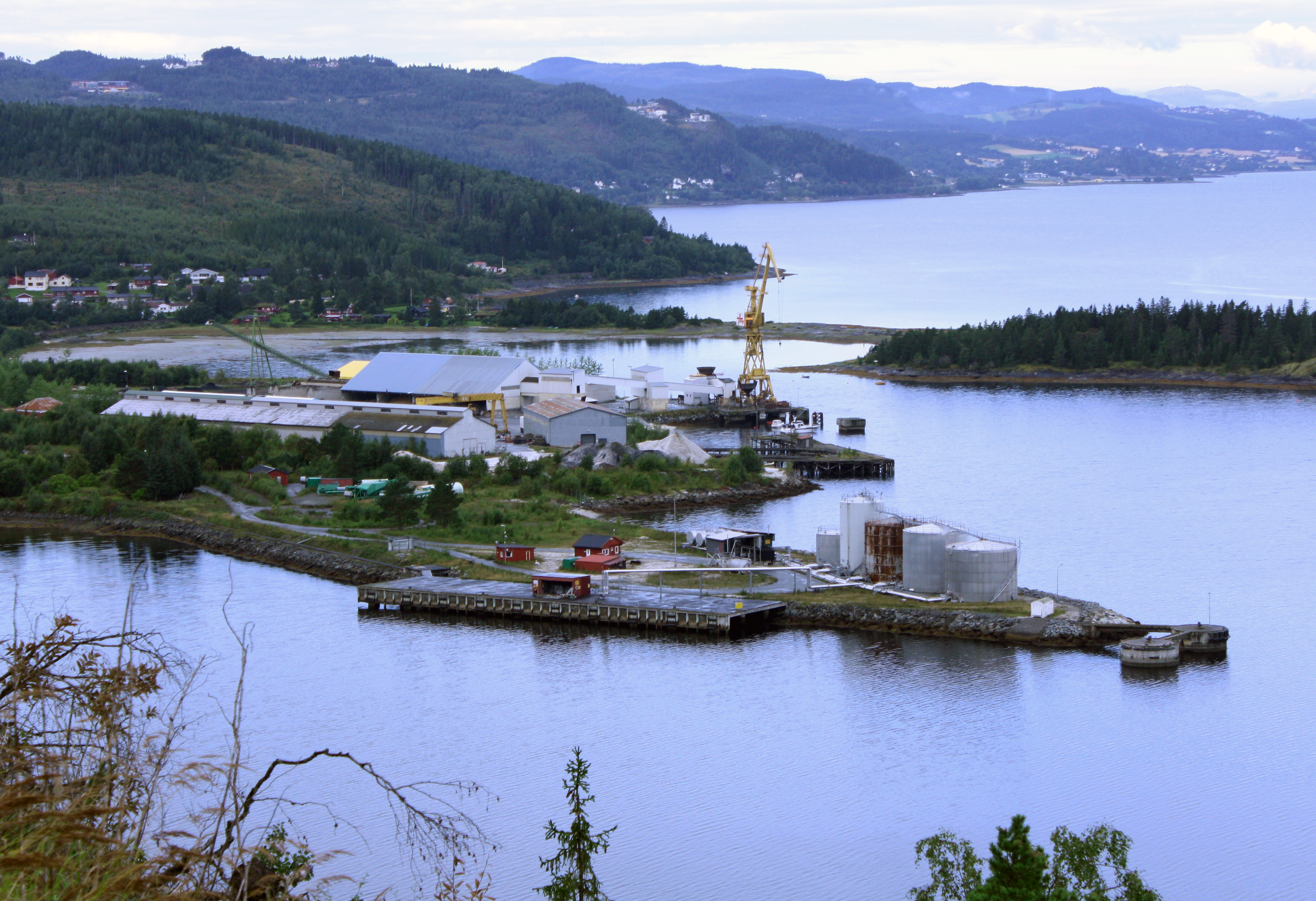
Muruvik remained an important export port for products hauled with the line until 2005

World War I was a boom for the Meråker Line. The line suddenly became a transit corridor for shipments from Russia, as well as from Sweden, to the ports in Trondheim and Hommelvik. To cope with the increased traffic, NSB had to both rent equipment from Sweden and acquire ten new Class 21 and Class 35 locomotives between 1913 and 1918. Four of these were transferred from other lines, while six were new. With the new locomotives, the dimensioned axle weight needed to be upgraded to 14 t (14 long tons; 15 short tons), mostly improving the bridges. The bridge at Funna was dismounted and sold to be used on the Gråkallen Line of the Trondheim Tramway. Class 35 was used on the Gudå–Storlien section, and replaced the aging Class 14. They remained in service until 1929, when they were transferred to the Ofoten Line.

In 1927, the first pure through-passenger trains started operating in the summer, towards Sweden in the morning and back during the evening. From 1933 it operated all year. Through the 1920s and 1930s, many shorter distances received extra trains, and passenger and freight trains were gradually separated into separate trains. The traffic through Trondheim–Hell increased; commuter trains terminated at several stations. From 1930, multiple units were also used on the line.

=== World War II ===
During the German occupation of Norway from 9 April 1940, traffic continued ordinarily until 14 April, when a telephone message was misunderstood, and Norwegian military forces shot at a train they thought had Germans on board. After this, traffic on the line was halted. On the Swedish side of the border, 1 to 2 kilometers (0.62 to 1.24 mi) of the track was broken to hinder the Germans from using the line to access Sweden. Local traffic to Kopperå started again on 25 April. On 17 May, a train ran to Storlien with a general to discuss reopening the line. The answer was negative, but on 24 May, an agreement was struck. At the same time, military trains were put into use, from Snåsa and Steinkjer to Storlien, and onward to Narvik. After transport on the Ofoten Line to Narvik (via Sweden) was officially reopened on 2 August, there were regular trains from Trondheim via the Meråker Line to Narvik, with up to three trains a day.

On 19 November 1940, a train with workers from Trondheim to the airport collided with the local train from Kopperå just east of Hommelvik Station. The Hommelvik train collision killed 22 people. The trains were supposed to have passed at Homnmelvik Station, but the engineer thought he had seen the other train and had left the station. The accident occurred at 08:03 and was caused by there being virtually no light, since all outdoor sources of light were covered. On 23 January 1941, a coke and coal train from Sweden lost its braking between the border and Kopperå. The six back cars plus the caboose derailed just west of Kopperå Station, while the locomotive and 17 other trains continued their wild flight. The train derailed at Meråker Station, and the Meråker train derailment killed both the engineer and the stoker.

During the war, the railway and its personnel were an active part of the Norwegian resistance movement. In particular, Swedish newspapers and literature were smuggled into the country, primarily by stokers, who hid the material in the coal. Also, people who could not flee to Sweden via the mountains, or needed to get out in a hurry, were sometimes smuggled on board the trains, primarily on German trains. Illegal documents and microfilms were also smuggled out. For German transport trains, track-side employees tried to create "delays."

=== Post-war ===
After the war, there were limited resources for new rolling stock and upgrades to the line. Multiple units gradually took over passenger trains, and by 1957, no passenger trains to Storlien were hauled by locomotives. That year Stavne–Leangen Line opened, allowing trains to bypass Trondheim Central Station. The new Di 3 diesel locomotives were put into service in 1961. The last steam engine was taken out of service in 1971. Introducing the Di 3 forced an upgrade to the line to allow for an axle load of 18 tonnes. The opening of European Road E14 in the 1950s caused a reduction in shorter-haul passenger and freight. NSB subsequently cut passenger services to a single daily train, with a Di 3 hauling Swedish carriages through Meråker. Trains continuing along the Nordland Line continued to increase.

Maintenance remained mostly manual until the 1960s, after which a major rationalization plan shifted this work to machines. This increased the line's capacity, allowing for heavier and faster trains. Hegra, Sona and Flornes Stations were made unstaffed in 1970.

Freight volumes remained high throughout the following decades. In the late 1950s, the Swedish Air Force built a 32 million kroner storage area for aviation fuel at Muruvik. The terminal would be a reserve in case of an attack on Sweden, and the Meråker Line would transport the fuel into Sweden. The depot was sold in 1988 to Petrofina, following the Royal Norwegian Air Force's quest to build a pipeline to the NATO base at Trondheim Airport, Værnes.

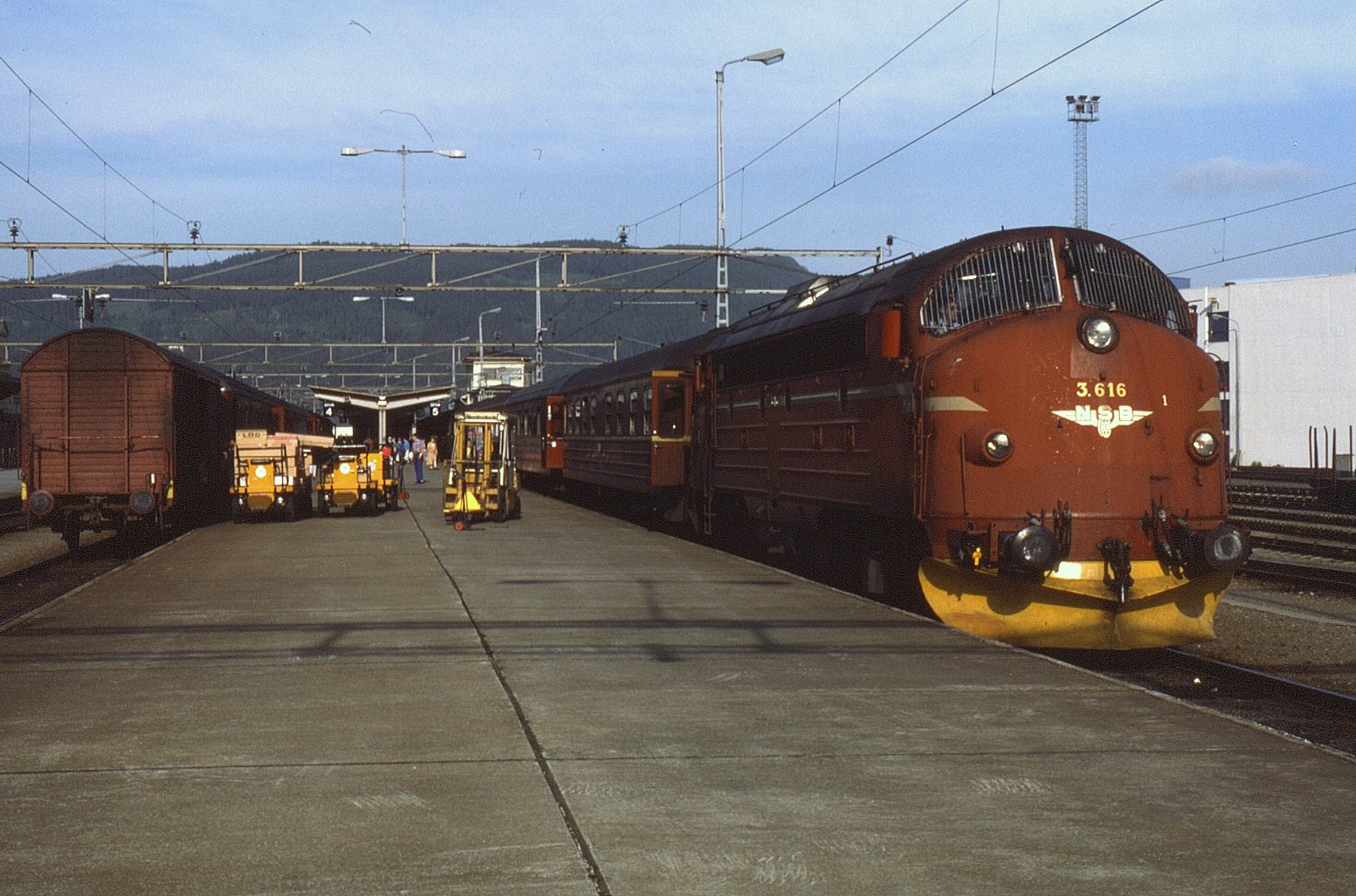
NSB Di 3 locomotive ready to haul the 8:15 day train on the Nordland Line from Trondheim Central Station on 10 June 1986. The Di 3s were the main traction on the Meråker Line from the 1960s through the 1990s.

As in the past, the Swedish authorities continued to subsidize freight operations on their side, making it profitable for Swedish exports to go via the Baltic Sea. However, hopes in Trondheim for their city to act as a major transit port for Swedish cargo never materialized. The 1966 opening of Norske Skog Skogn paper mill saw an increase in the transport of lumber from Sweden. The petroleum transport lasted until the 1980s when the Muruvik terminal was sold to Norwegian interests. A significant customer was still Meråker Smelteverk, who used designated trains to haul ore from Muruvik to Kopperå and microsilica in return. By 1980, cargo volumes were up to the level seen during World War I.

=== 21st century ===
The line had 400,000 tonnes of cargo in 2005. Half of this was for Norske Skog, and 130,000 tonnes for Eklem Meråker, the smelter. The latter was shut down the following year, with the subsequent drop in traffic. That year the line received a 60-million-kroner upgrade, increasing the maximum axle load to 22.5 tonnes, the same as on the Central Line. Speeds increased from 50 to 80 km/h (31 to 50 mph) for freight trains and from 100 to 130 km/h (62 to 81 mph) for passenger trains. The Norwegian National Rail Administration, who took the line in 1996, opened the Gevingåsen Tunnel between Hell and Hommelvik 15 August 2011, making the section from Hell to Muruvik a branch. The Rail Administration reclassified the lines in 2008 so that the section from Trondheim to Hell is now part of the Nordland Line and only the section from Hell to Storlien is regarded as part of the Meråker Line.

The Trøndelag Commuter Rail was established in 1993, increasing the frequency on the western part of the line. With the retirement of the Di 3 in 2000, the Class 92 multiple units were introduced also on the Meråker Line. The concept, named initially Mittnabotåget, saw two daily services, originally running to Östersund Central Station. From 2007 a train change was introduced at Storlien. Through traffic was closed from November 2013 to March 2015 with a bridge closed on the Swedish side.

Passenger traffic was canceled along the entire line east of Hell in March 2020 due to the COVID-19 pandemic, and reopening is planned for October 2021.

The line goes through a long canyon from roughly Hegra and Gudå that runs parallel to the Stjørdalselva river that is prone to floods and mudslides during bad weather, and the line occasionally closes as a result of that. The line was closed on 2 March 2025 due to stormy weather that was predicted to be bad enough to cause problems in the canyon; the predictions held true, and mudslides along the line caused it to close until early April 2025.

On 7 November 2025 the Meråker Line was interrupted by a landslide, combined with rockfall, between Hell and Gudå.

=== Electrification and upgrades ===
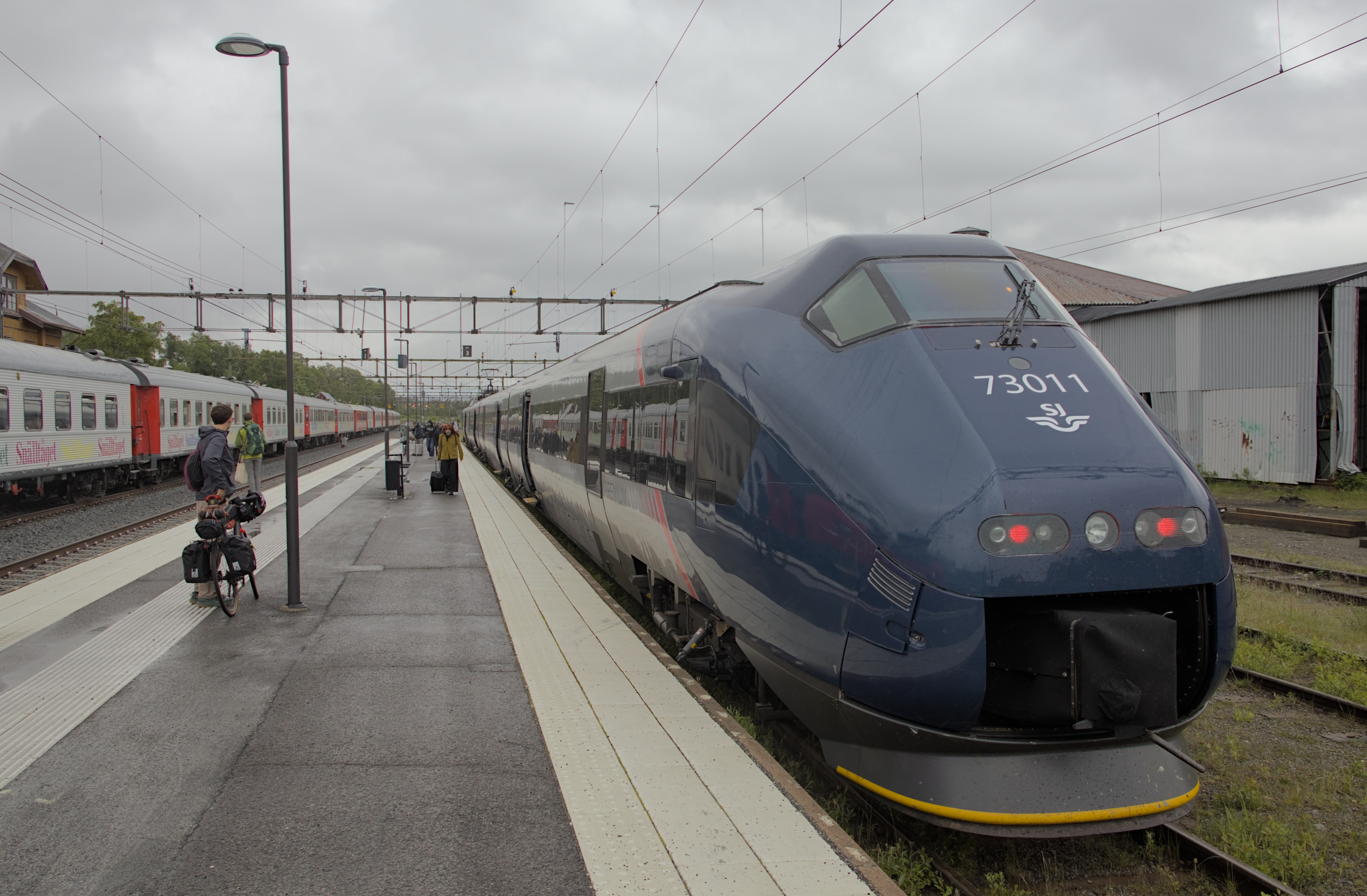
Electric Class 73 trainset at the terminus at Storlien.

Previously, the historical lack of electrification has been described as the "missing green link" in using the Meråker Line for intermodal transport for shipping out of Trondheim. The line could also act as a secondary line for fish exports from Northern Norway to the continent. The steep gradient between Gudå and Storlien is prohibitive for a single diesel locomotive and requires a booster engine, and thus would be more economical using electric traction. These issues limit cargo hauling on the line to lumber trains.

Proposals for electrification of the Meråker Line have been made since the 1940s. By then the Swedish side had been electrified. This was initially desired also by NSB in an effort to cut the high operating costs of steam trains. However, lines with higher traffic received priority. By 1971 the last steam trains were retired and issue of electrification for marginal lines were shelved. Electrification was pressed by regional bodies from 1978 and 1992, and then again from the 2000s. This time the issue was successful and in 2013 the Parliament of Norway approved the electrification of the Meråker Line and the section from Trondheim to Steinkjer.

Installation of centralized traffic control is scheduled to take place as part of nationwide implementation of European Train Control System, which itself is scheduled to be completed within 2023. Increasing capacity and efficiency on the line requires more and longer passing tracks, especially for longer freight trains. One component of this, the passing loop at Gudå Station, has been proposed to be lengthened. To allow trains to run from the Meråker Line directly northward on the Nordland Line, a wye has been proposed to be built at Hell Station, as all regular freight trains on the line come from the north.

The electrification of the line began in 2023, and was completed in 2025. Related to the electrification were plans to begin operating overnight sleeping car trains from Trondheim to Stockholm, especially in regards to the FIS Nordic World Ski Championships 2025 that was to be held in Trondheim, but the electrification was not completed in time. After electrification was completed in the autumn of 2025, the Norwegian Railway Directorate turned down submissions from Norrtåg and SJ Norway to operate new lines from Trondheim to Sundsvall and Stockholm respectively, claiming that the potential market for it was too small. In November 2025, Snälltåget announced they were considering whether to extend their existing Malmö-Storlien line to Trondheim; they would have to confirm their plans to the Norwegian Railway Directorate 18 months in advance before extending it.

== Operations ==
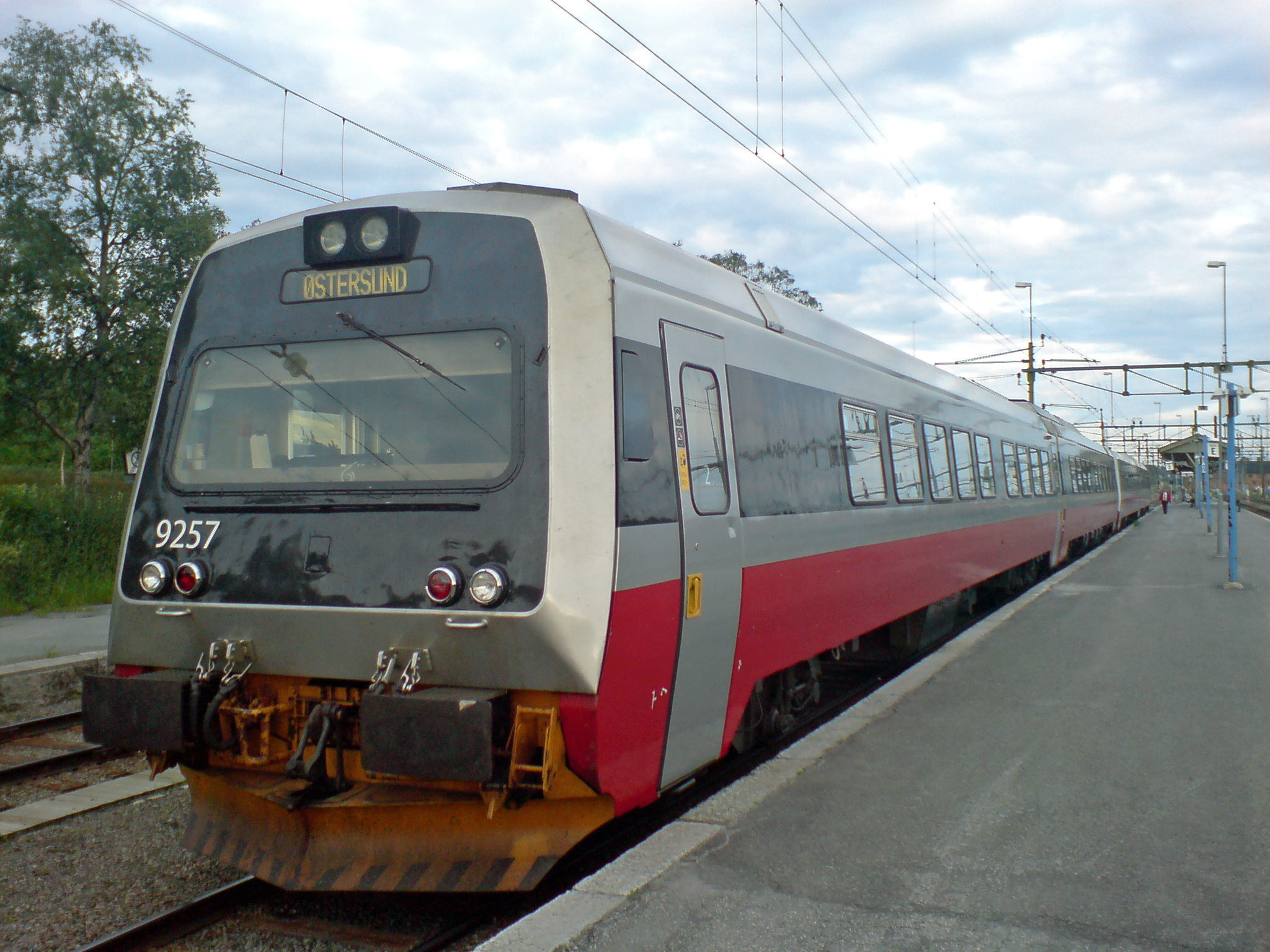
NSB Class 92 diesel multiple unit

Norwegian State Railways operated two daily round trips between Heimdal Station via Trondheim Central Station to Storlien Station until March 2020. SJ Norge won the bid to run passenger trains on the line from June 2020 onwards. At Storlien, passengers change to a regional train operated on the Central Line by Norrtåg. This served was marketed as Nabotoget ("the neighbor train") in Norway and Mittnabotåget in Sweden until 2012. Travel time from Trondheim to Storlien is 1 hour and 44 minutes. Most freight trains are lumber trains, hauling timber from Jämtland to the Norske Skog Skogn paper mill. There is also a train hauling limestone from Verdal Municipality to Örnsköldsvik.

== Architecture ==
Peter Andreas Blix was chosen to be the line's main architect. Hell was the largest station along the line, at 148 square meters (1,590 sq ft). Slightly smaller 110 square meters (1,200 sq ft) buildings were built at Ranheim, Malvik, Hommelvik and Gudå. Smaller 90 square meters (970 sq ft) station buildings were erected at Leangen, Hegra, Flornes and Meråker. These were all built in wood. Stylistically, Blix drew inspiration from the freer composition of British railway stations of the 1870s, often resulting in non-symmetrical stations, accented with Gothic inspiration. Blix designed stations along the Røros Line and the Jæren Line in similar styles.

Balthazar Lange designed Trondheim Central Station. The originally two-story station was designed in Renaissance Revival architecture. With the opening of the Hell–Sunnan Line in 1902, there was a need for a larger station at Hell. The Blix' station building was therefore moved to Sunnan Station, while a new and larger building, designed by Paul Due, was built at Hell. It received an intermediate style between Dragestil and Jugendstil.

== Driver’s cab documentation ==
Cab ride recordings on the Meråker Line show the mountain crossing between Hell and Storlien, including winter operations and gradients. Overview:

== Bibliography ==
- Bjerke, Thor; Holom, Finn (2004). Banedata 2004 (in Norwegian). Hamar / Oslo: Norwegian Railway Museum / Norwegian Railway Club. ISBN 82-90286-28-7.
- Hoås, Jan; Stene, Morten (2005). Hell Sunnanbanen (in Norwegian). Jubileumskomiteen.
- Hartmann, Eivind; Mangset, Øistein; Reisegg, Øyvind (1997). Neste stasjon (in Norwegian). Oslo: Gyldendal Norsk Forlag. ISBN 82-05-25294-7.
- Røe, Tormod (1982). Merakerbanen 100 år. Historielaga i Stjørdalsføret. ISBN 82-990879-0-2.
- Røe, Tormod (2015). Meråkerbanen Trondheim–Storlien. Historielaga i Stjørdalsføret. ISBN 978-82-93044-06-2.
