= Hommelvik Station =

Railway station in Malvik, Norway

Hommelvik Station Hommelvik stasjon
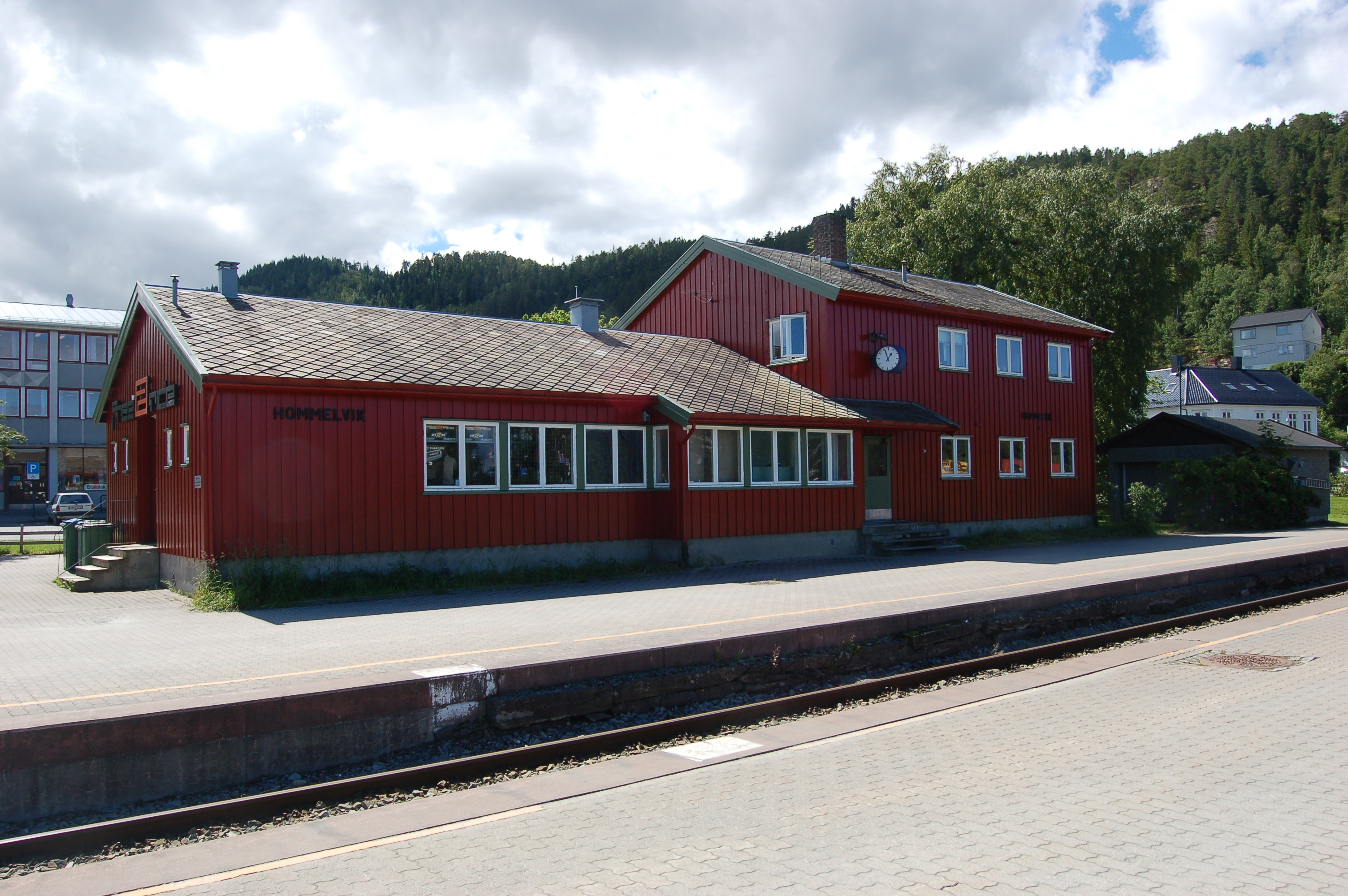
- View of the station

General information
- Location: Hommelvik, Malvik Municipality; Trøndelag; Norway
- Coordinates: 63.411696°N 10.793683°E
- Elevation: 7.5 metres (25 ft) above sea level
- System: Railway station
- Owner: Bane NOR
- Operator: SJ Norge
- Line: Nordland Line
- Distance: 23.14 kilometres (14.38 mi)
- Platforms: 2
- Connections: Bus: AtB

History
- Opened: 17 October 1881
Location
- Location within Trøndelag Location within Norway

Hommelvik Station is a railway station located in the village of Hommelvik in Malvik Municipality in Trøndelag county, Norway. It is 23.14 kilometres (14.38 mi) east of the city of Trondheim.

The station is located on the Nordland Line, and it is served hourly by the Trøndelag Commuter Rail service to Steinkjer Station and Trondheim Central Station. The unstaffed station is operated by SJ Norge.

== History ==
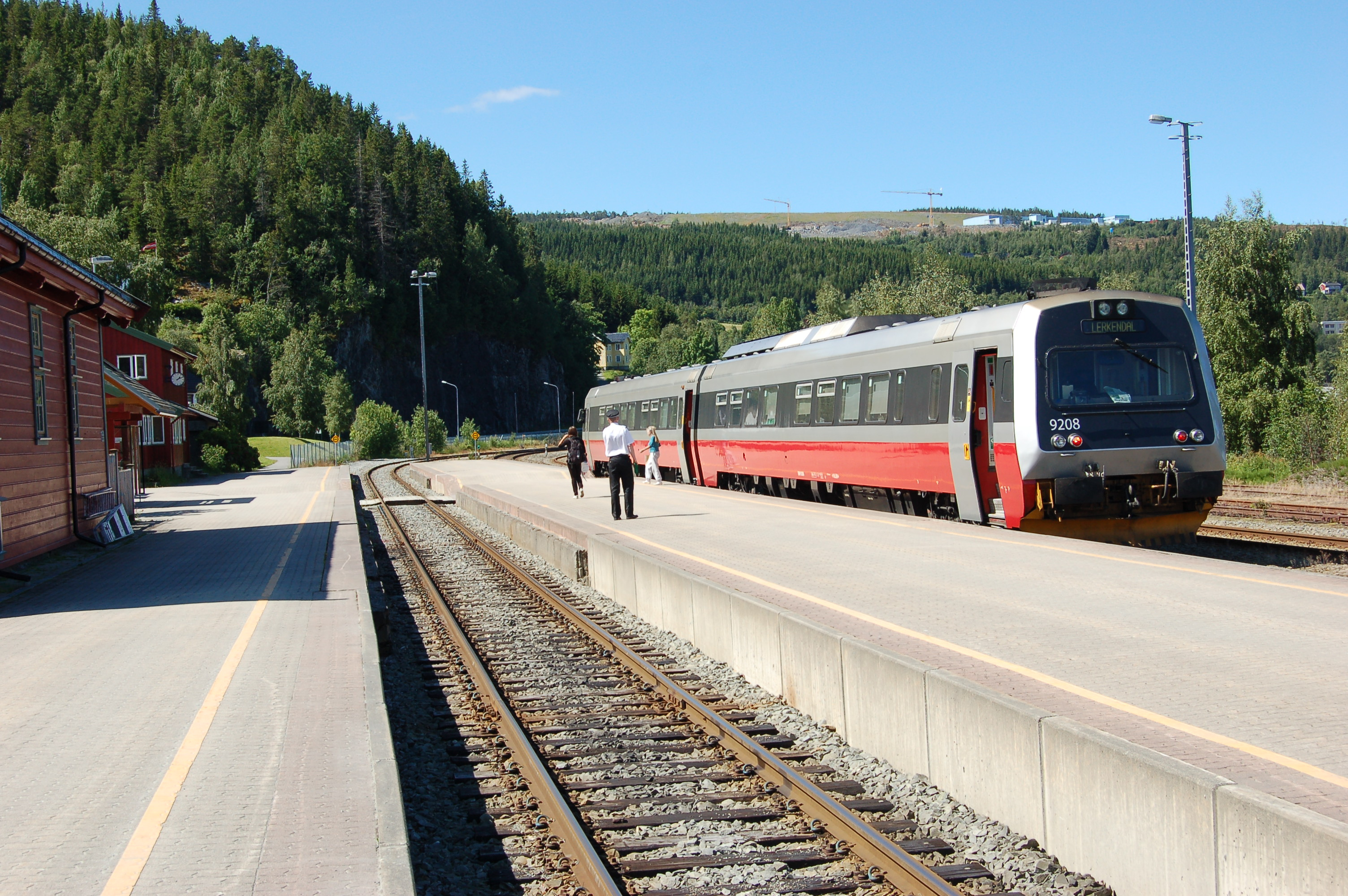
A Class 92 commuter train

.

The station was built as part of the Meråker Line railway line and it opened on 17 October 1881. The current station building was built in 1958. One of the worst railway disasters in Norway happened in 1940 near Hommelvik, in which two trains collided with 22 deaths. See: Hommelvik train collision

Preceding station	Regional trains	Following station
Vikhammer towards Trondheim S	R71	Hell towards Storlien
Preceding station	Local trains	Following station
Vikhammer	Trøndelag Commuter Rail	Hell
