= Hommelvik train collision =

1940 train collision in Norway

Coordinates: 63°24′41″N 10°47′37″E

The Hommelvik train disaster was a train collision at Hommelvik Station, on the Meråker Line (today part of the Nordland Line) in Norway.

On 19 November 1940, a train with workers from Trondheim Central Station to Trondheim Airport, Værnes collided with the local train from Kopperå just east of Hommelvik Station. The Hommelvik train disaster killed 22 people. The trains were supposed to have passed at Hommelvik Station, but the engineer thought he had seen the other train, and had left the station. The accident occurred at 08:03, and was caused by there being virtually no light to see with, since all outdoor sources of light were covered.
