= Meraker Brug =

Company in Meråker, Norway

AS Meraker Brug
- Company type: Private
- Industry: Estate, forestry
- Predecessor: Selbo Kobberverk
- Founded: 1906
- Founder: Thomas Fearnley
- Headquarters: Meråker Municipality, Norway
- Area served: Stjørdalen
- Owner: Statskog SF (-2022)
- Website: merakerbrug.no

AS Meraker Brug is a company which owns 1,330 square kilometres (510 sq mi) of wilderness and forest estate, mostly in Meråker Municipality, Norway. Activities include forestry, cabin rental, hunting and fishing. It owns 1,219 square kilometres (471 sq mi) in Meråker Municipality, consisting of 96% of the municipality, 63 square kilometres (24 sq mi) in Malvik Municipality, 48 square kilometres (19 sq mi) in Stjørdal Municipality and 0.5 square kilometres (0.19 sq mi) in Steinkjer Municipality. 250 square kilometres (97 sq mi) is productive forest. The company used to be owned by the Astrup family, who live in the Oslo area. But in 2022 the Norwegian Government bought the company for 2.65 billion NOK, and is now owned by Statskog.

Commercial activities in Meråker started the first centuries BCE, with iron mining and later charcoal and tar. Later copper mines and sawmills were established. The estate eventually became known as Selbo Kobberverk ("Selbo Copper Works"), which was bought by Hans Rasmus Astrup, changed its name to Meraker Brug. After Astrup's death in 1898, the estate was sold and was incorporated in 1906, and by then consisted of Mostadmarken gods, Hommelvik Bruk, the Port of Muruvik, Tangen Sagbruk, a sawmill in Stjørdal, Nustad Tresliperi, a sawmill, the carbide plant in Meråker (later Elkem Meraker), the copper mines and a limestone quarry in Meråker, as well as the hunting, fishing, waterfall and forestry rights on the real estate. It was bought by Thomas Fearnley, who incorporated the company after merging the estates Forbygdgodset and Mostadmarka.
