= Kopperå =

Village in Meråker Municipality, Norway

- Village
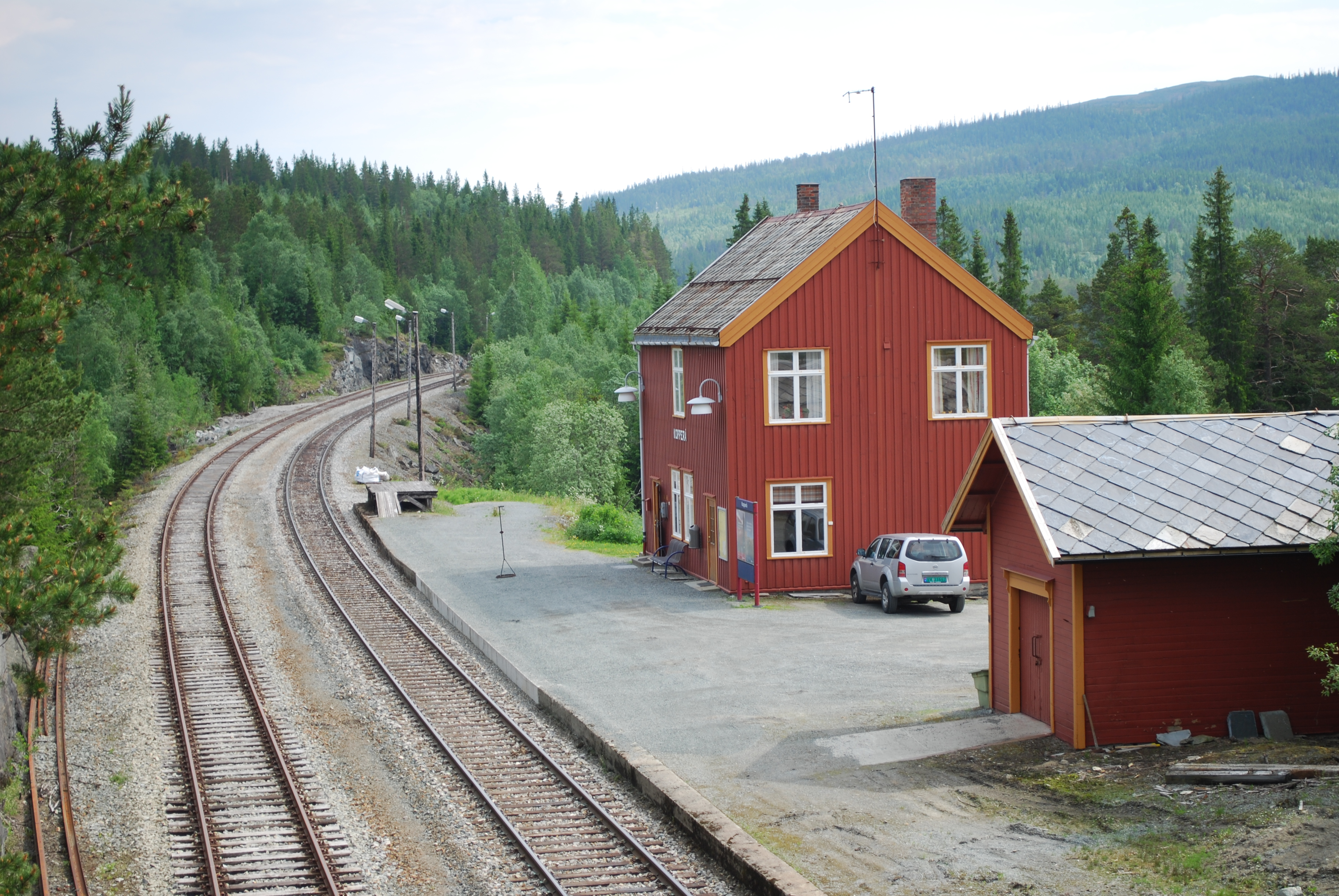
- View of the village
- Interactive map of Kopperå
- Location within Trøndelag Location within Norway
- Coordinates: 63.3928°N 11.8475°E
- Country: Norway
- Region: Central Norway
- County: Trøndelag
- District: Stjørdalen
- Municipality: Meråker Municipality

Area
  - Total: 0.64 km^{2} (0.25 sq mi)
- Elevation: 335 m (1,099 ft)

Population (2008)
  - Total: 207
  - Density: 323/km^{2} (840/sq mi)
- Time zone: UTC+01:00 (CET)
  - Summer (DST): UTC+02:00 (CEST)
- Post Code: 7533 Kopperå

Kopperå is a village in Meråker Municipality in Trøndelag county, Norway. The village lies about 7 kilometres (4.3 mi) east of the municipal center of Midtbygda, about 12 kilometres (7.5 mi) north of the village of Stordalsvollen, and about 14 kilometres (8.7 mi) west of the Swedish border. The Meråker Line railway runs through the village and stops at the Kopperå Station. The village sits near the confluence of the rivers Kåpperåa and Stjørdalselva, and it is about 5 kilometres (3.1 mi) south of the lake Fjergen. The local Kopperå Chapel sits on the northwest edge of the village.

The 0.64-square-kilometre (160-acre) village had a population (2006) of 207 and a population density of 323 inhabitants per square kilometre (840/sq mi). Since 2008, the population and area data for this village area has not been separately tracked by Statistics Norway.

== Manufacturing ==
Kopperå had one of the best microsilica factories, Elkem Meraaker, a member of the Elkem Group. Elkem Meraaker (originally Meraaker Smelteverk) started to manufacture carbide in 1898, and was later re-built to manufacture microsilica. But in 2005 the company made the decision to end microsilica manufacturing. The factory ceased operations in summer 2006 and the buildings were taken down by 2008.
