= Kopperå Station =

Railway station in Meråker, Norway

Kopperå Station Kopperå stasjon
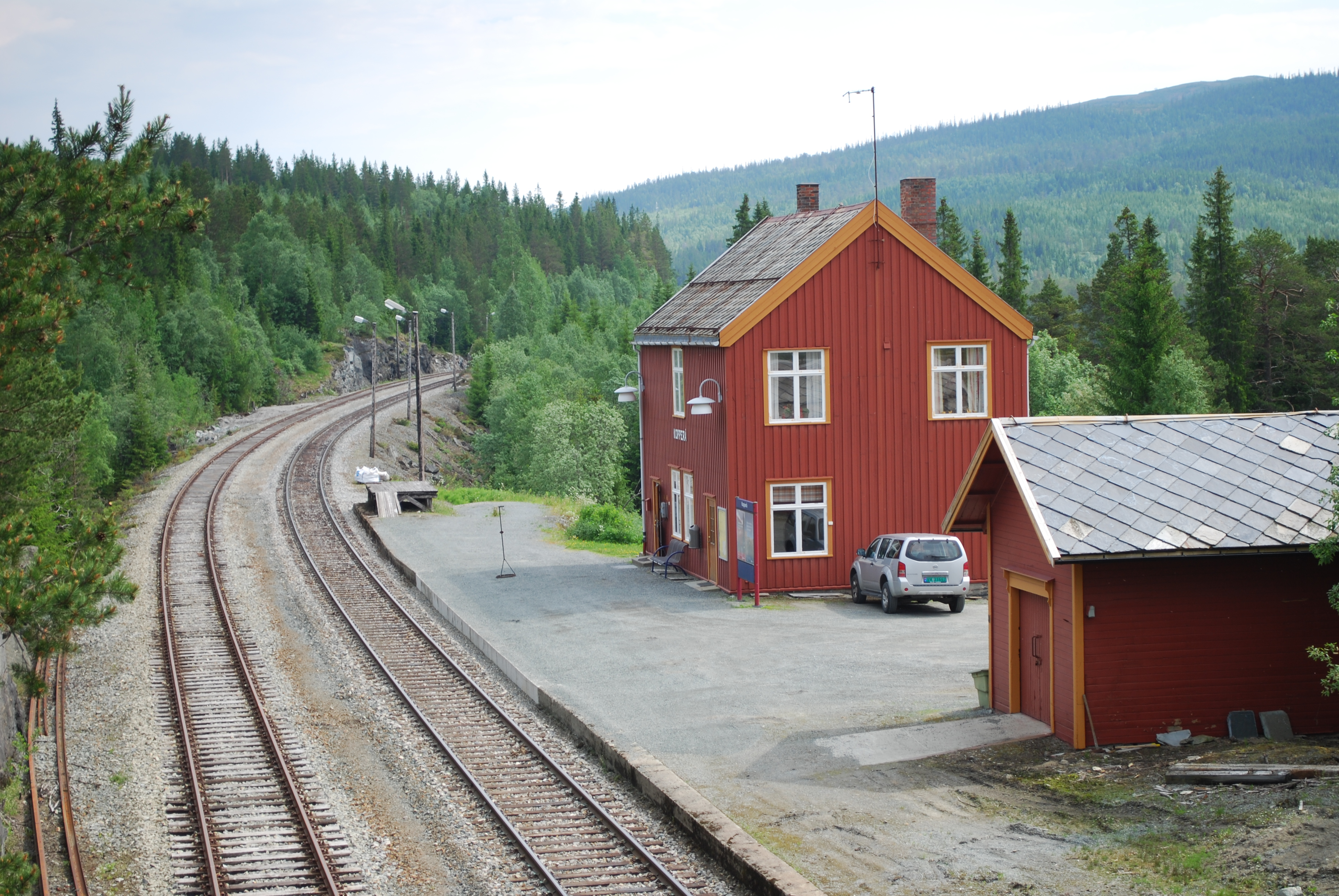
- View of the station

General information
- Location: Kopperå, Meråker Municipality; Trøndelag; Norway
- Coordinates: 63.392021°N 11.848412°E
- Elevation: 328.5 metres (1,078 ft)
- System: Railway station
- Owner: Bane NOR
- Operator: SJ Norge
- Line: Meråkerbanen
- Distance: 88.30 kilometres (54.87 mi)
- Platforms: 1

Other information
- Station code: KPR

History
- Opened: 1 April 1899
Location
- Location within Trøndelag Location within Norway

Kopperå Station (Norwegian: Kopperå stasjon) is a railway station on the Meråker Line in the village of Kopperå in Meråker Municipality in Trøndelag county, Norway. The station was opened on 1 April 1899 as Kopperaasen. It was renamed Kopperåen in April 1924. It received the current name on 1 September 1925.

The station is served twice a day in each direction by SJ Norge. The building is owned by Bane NOR. It is located 88 kilometres (55 mi) from Trondheim Central Station and sits at an elevation of 328.5 metres (1,078 ft) above sea level.

Preceding station	Regional trains	Following station
Meråker towards Trondheim S	R71	Storlien Terminus
