= Meråker Station =

Railway station in Meråker, Norway

Meråker Station Meråker stasjon
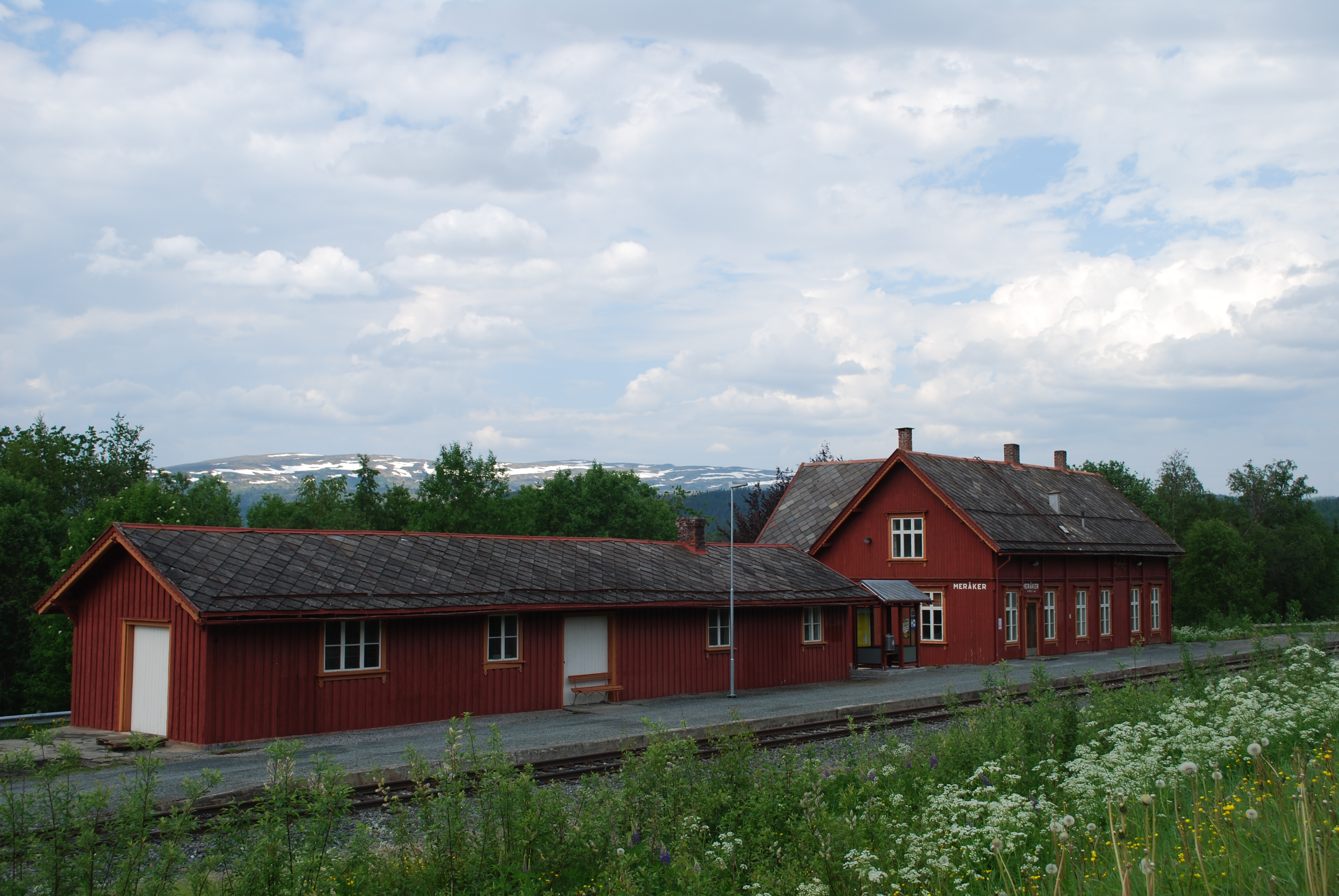
- View of the station

General information
- Location: Midtbygda, Meråker Municipality; Trøndelag; Norway
- Coordinates: 63.42249°N 11.759233°E
- Elevation: 219.6 metres (720 ft)
- System: Railway station
- Owner: Bane NOR
- Operator: SJ Norge
- Line: Meråkerbanen
- Distance: 81.08 kilometres (50.38 mi)
- Platforms: 1

Other information
- Station code: MER

History
- Opened: 17 October 1881
Location
- Location within Trøndelag Location within Norway

Meråker Station (Norwegian: Meråker stasjon) is a railway station on the Meråker Line in the village of Midtbygda in Meråker Municipality in Trøndelag county, Norway. The station was opened on 17 October 1881 as Meraker, and received the current name on 1 June 1919.

The station has been unstaffed since 2 January 1987. It is served twice a day in each direction by SJ Norge. It is located 81 kilometres (50 mi) from Trondheim Central Station and sits at an elevation of 220 metres (720 ft) above sea level. The station is owned by Bane NOR.

Preceding station	Regional trains	Following station
Gudå towards Trondheim S	R71	Kopperå towards Storlien
