= Hell Tunnel =

Road tunnel in Trøndelag, Norway

Hell Tunnel Helltunnelen
- Interactive map of Hell Tunnel; Helltunnelen

Overview
- Location: Trøndelag, Norway
- Coordinates: 63.4271°N 10.8425°E
- Status: In use
- Route: E6 / E14
- Start: Hommelvik, Malvik Municipality
- End: Hell, Stjørdal Municipality

Operation
- Opened: 18 October 1995
- Traffic: Automotive

Technical
- Length: 3,928 metres (12,887 ft)

The Hell Tunnel (Norwegian: Helltunnelen) is a 3,928-metre (12,887 ft) long road tunnel in Trøndelag county, Norway. The tunnel is located along the shared section of the European route E6 and European route E14 motorways that runs through the mountain Gjevingåsen between the villages of Hommelvik in Malvik Municipality and Hell in Stjørdal Municipality.

The tunnel was opened on 18 October 1995 and is the longest of the four tunnels between Trondheim and Stjørdalshalsen. It used to have a toll plaza on the southeast side of the tunnel, but now it is all automated, just as with several other tunnels in Norway. The tunnel was built as part of the Trondheim Toll Scheme.

The tunnel will be get a secord pipe, in total four lanes, which had a construction start in 2020 and is expected to be opened for traffic in 2027.

== Name ==
The name of the tunnel comes from the nearby village of Hell. In the Norwegian language, neither the name of the village nor the tunnel has anything to do with the Christian concept of hell. In fact, in Norwegian, the word "hell" means "luck".
