= European route E14 =

Road in trans-European E-road network

E14

Route information
- Length: 449 km (279 mi)

Major junctions
- West end: Trondheim, Norway
- East end: Sundsvall, Sweden

Location
- Countries: Norway, Sweden

Highway system
- International E-road network; A Class; B Class

European route E14 is a part of the International E-road network. It runs between Trondheim, Norway, and Sundsvall, Sweden. The road is 449 kilometres (279 mi) long.

The road follows the route Trondheim - Storlien – Östersund – Sundsvall. Just east of Trondheim, the road goes through the 3,928-metre (12,887 ft) long Hell Tunnel.

After crossing the border from Norway it runs through the mountainous western Jämtland County of Sweden, passing the well-known Ånnsjön mountain lake.
