= Muruvika =

Village in Malvik Municipality, Norway

- Village
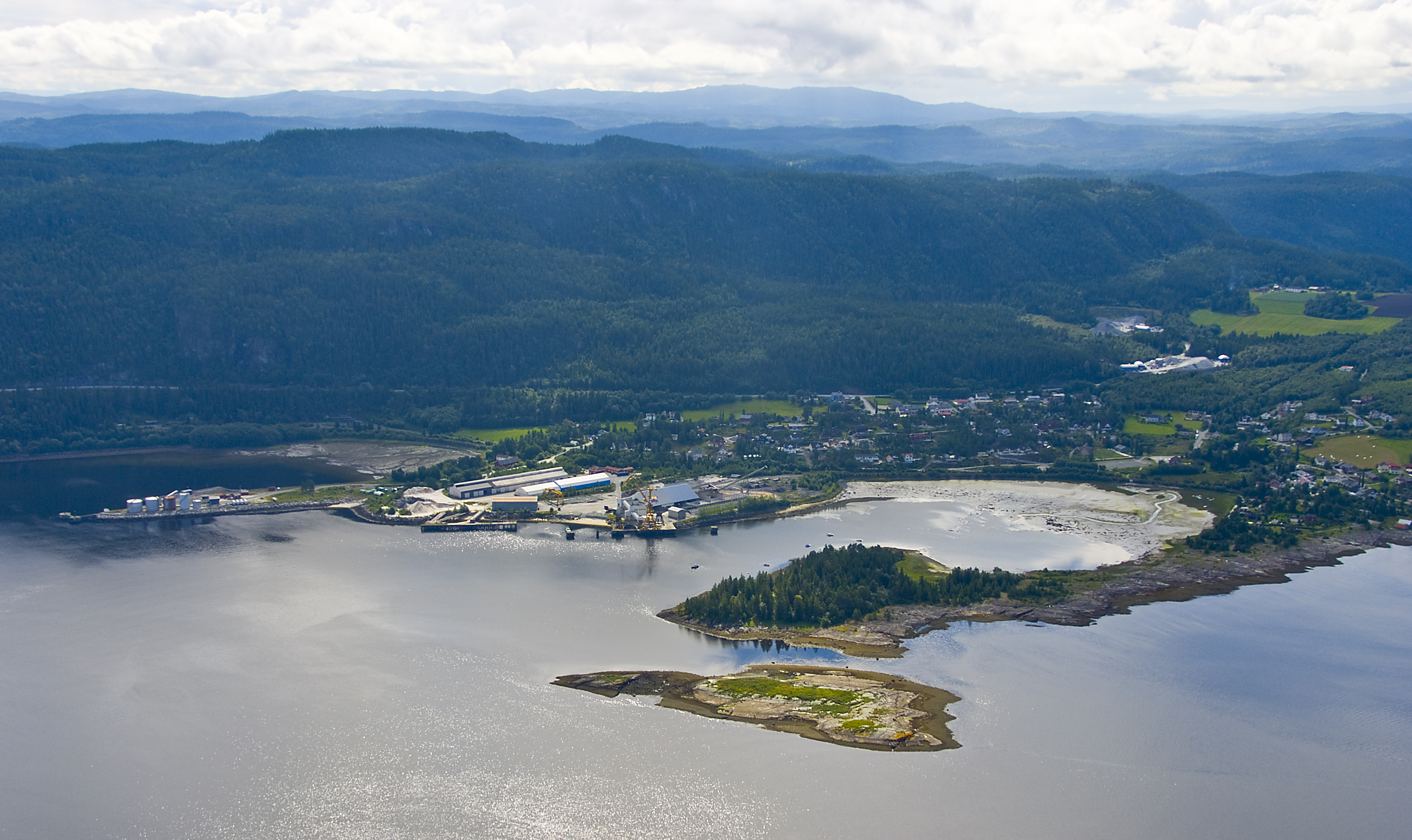
- View of the village
- Interactive map of Muruvika
- Location within Trøndelag Location within Norway
- Coordinates: 63.4325°N 10.8278°E
- Country: Norway
- Region: Central Norway
- County: Trøndelag
- District: Trondheim Region
- Municipality: Malvik Municipality

Area
  - Total: 0.37 km^{2} (0.14 sq mi)
- Elevation: 5 m (16 ft)

Population (2025)
  - Total: 456
  - Density: 1,232/km^{2} (3,190/sq mi)
- Time zone: UTC+01:00 (CET)
  - Summer (DST): UTC+02:00 (CEST)
- Post Code: 7550 Hommelvik

Muruvika is a village in Malvik Municipality in Trøndelag county, Norway. The village is located near the end of the Stjørdalsfjorden, an arm of the Trondheimsfjord. The village sits about 3 kilometres (1.9 mi) north of the village of Hommelvik, the municipal centre.

The European route E6 highway used to pass through the village, but the highway now goes through the Hell Tunnel just south of Muruvika. The Meråker Line railway also passes through the village.

The 0.37-square-kilometre (91-acre) village has a population (2025) of 456 and a population density of 1,232 inhabitants per square kilometre (3,190/sq mi).
