= Storlien =

- Location within Jämtland Location within Sweden
- Coordinates: 63°19′N 12°10′E
- Country: Sweden
- Province: Jämtland
- County: Jämtland County
- Municipality: Åre Municipality

Population
  - Total: 70
- Time zone: UTC+1 (CET)
  - Summer (DST): UTC+2 (CEST)
- Climate: Dfc

Storlien
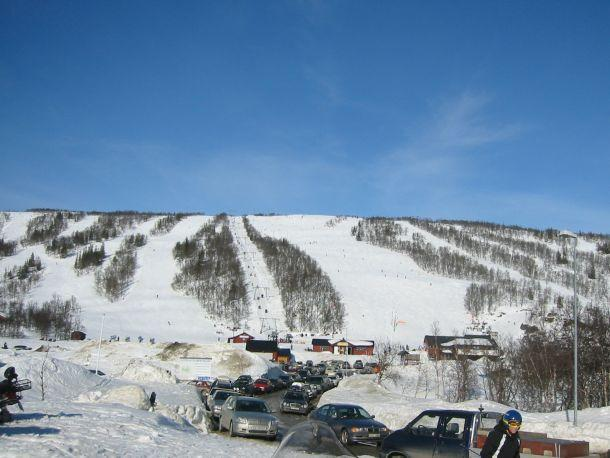
- Storlien in April 2004
- Interactive map of Storlien
- Location: Storlien, Sweden
- Vertical: 191 m (627 ft)
- Top elevation: 791 m (2,595 ft)
- Base elevation: 600 m (2,000 ft)
- Trails: 23
- Longest run: 1.5 km (0.93 mi)
- Lift system: 9 surface lifts
- Terrain parks: 2
- Snowmaking: yes
- Night skiing: Every Friday at "Slalombacken"

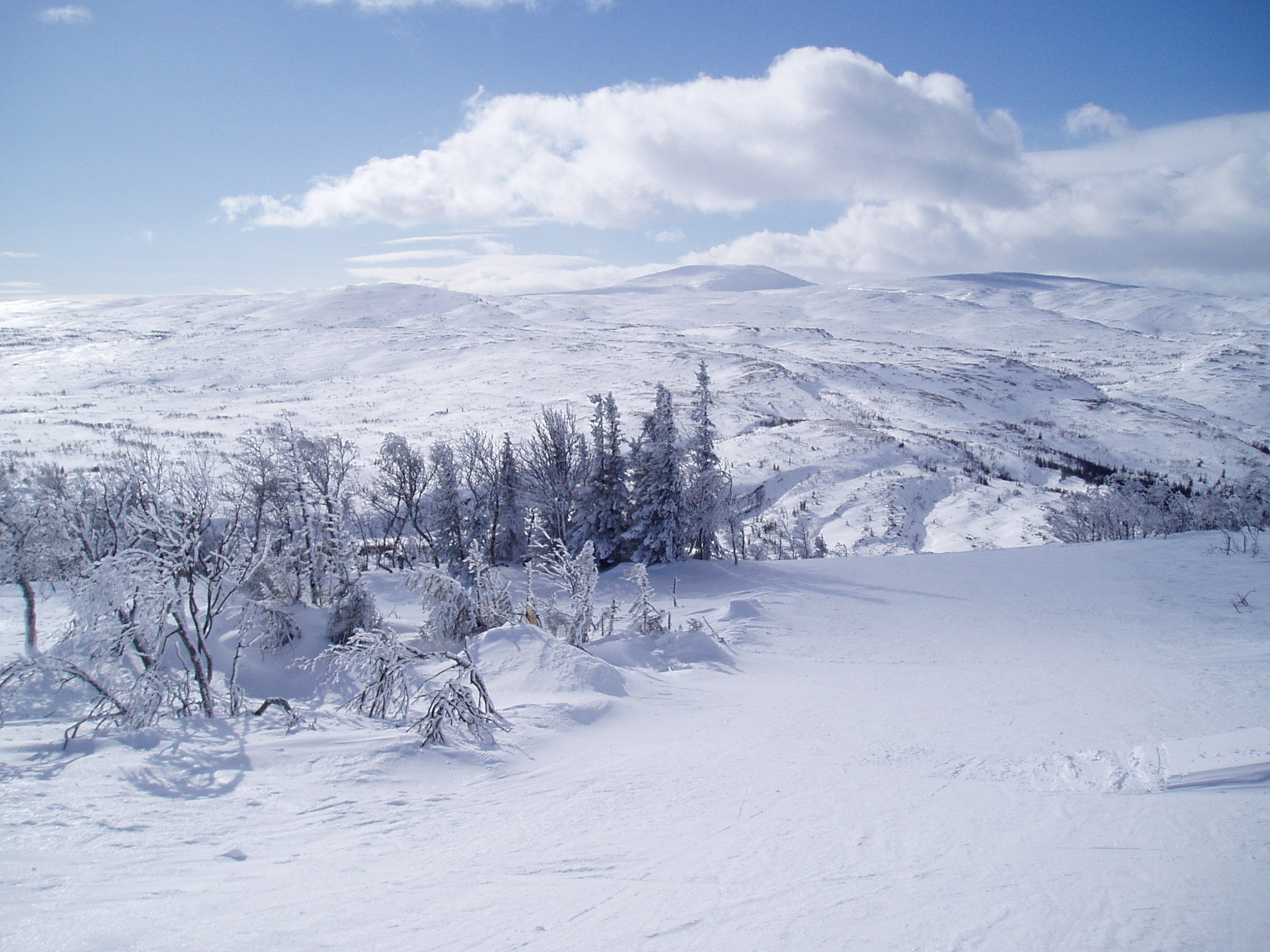
Panorama from the top of the ski area

Storlien [ˈstuːrˌliːən] is a village and ski resort located in Åre municipality in Jämtland, Sweden, two kilometres from the Swedish-Norwegian border. The primary bases of the settlement are tourism and outdoor life – alpine skiing, snowmobiling, cross-country skiing, hunting, fishing and hiking. During the 2000s, retail sales to customers from Norway become important, and most of the tourists in Storlien are Norwegians. The Swedish royal family has a house in Storlien, where they usually celebrate Easter and the New Year. There was also previously a sanitarium. Storlien was formerly the centre of winter activities for Skidfrämjandet, now Friluftsfrämjandet, an organisation that promotes outdoor leisure, and played a major role in developing downhill skiing in Sweden.

Storlien has, among other services, a hotel called Storliens högfjällshotell ('Storlien Mountain Lodge') and a holiday village called Fjäll-lien. A large part of the village is owned by the Lars Nilsson estate, a real estate agent. The hotel was formerly the largest in the country. In 2011 Ulrich John, a Stockholm real-estate investor, bought it, the lifts and "a few thousand hectares of mountain", but he sold the hotel in 2013.

== History ==
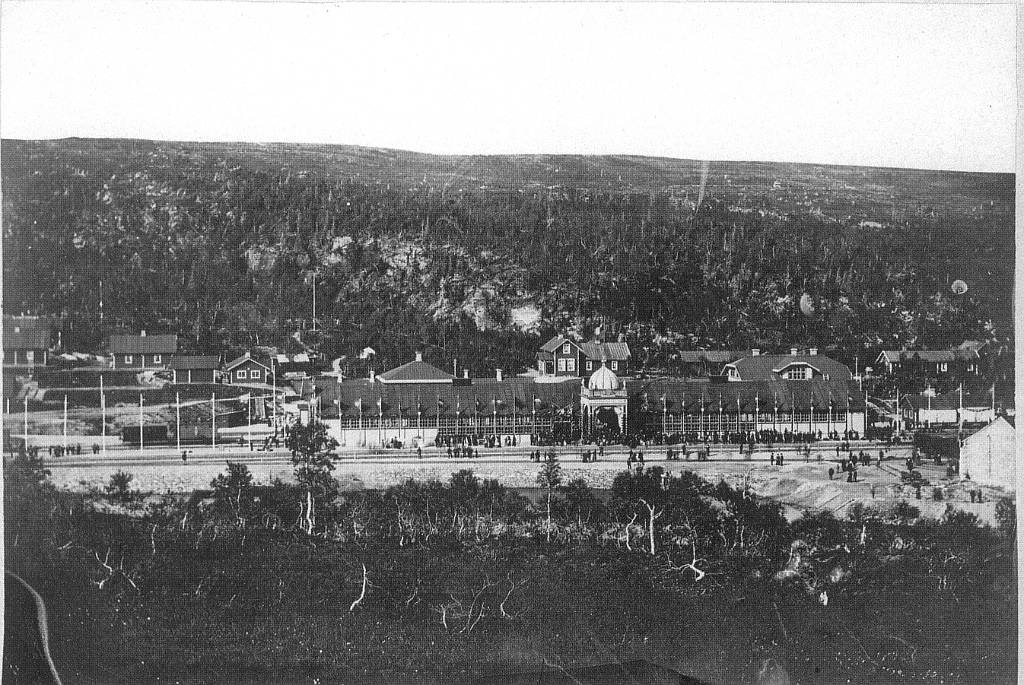
Inauguration of Central Line / Meråker Line in 1882, Storlien

Until the beginning of the 19th century, Storlien was mostly used by Norwegians for hunting, fishing and summer pasturing. The village was first settled in 1844, and late in the 19th century began its development into a tourist centre. The Central Line opened in 1882, and the physician Ernst Westerlund opened a summer practice there in the same year. A few years later, two hotels opened. Thanks to its easily accessible high mountain terrain and railway station, Storlien soon became a centre for the activities of the outdoor activities organisation Skidfrämjandet. In 1924, on the initiative of female instructors, they held a four-day course in "modern ski technique" at Storlien in collaboration with the Swedish Ski Delegation and the Swedish Tourist Association. The instructor was Gunnar Dyhlén, who taught different ways to turn the skis, and the course is thus also considered the starting point for organised Alpine skiing in Sweden. At New Year's in 1931, the first slalom course in Sweden, Möllers Backe, was spontaneously cleared on the mountain slopes of Skurdalshöjden. In 1933 Prince Gustaf Adolf and Princess Sibylla received as a wedding gift from Skidfrämjandet a holiday cabin which is still owned by the royal family.

The Swedish ski pioneer Olle Rimfors visited the Austrian and Swiss Alps and returned with lots practical knowledge of alpine skiing. On his return in 1934 he established Slalombacken at Storlien; this was the first purpose-built slalom slope in Sweden after the old slalom course at Östeberget in Östersund. In 1935, under Rimfors' leadership, Friluftsfrämjandet held there the first international slalom competition in Jämtland under International Ski Federation rules; it was the second in Sweden if an event in Riksgränsen at Pentecost 1934, in which an American tourist took part, is included. Sweden's first slalom club, Skidfrämjandets slalomklubb, was also organised in Storlien, with the entire country as its region.

During World War II Storlien was used by the military and was a restricted destination. In 1940, top-secret military negotiations between Sweden and Nazi Germany were held there in a railway carriage.

In 1942 the first ski lift opened in Storlien, the second one to be built in Sweden. In 1958 the hotel was expanded to a capacity of 550 guests; it was the largest in the country and in the mid-1960s employed 274 people.

Between 1972 and 1995, the industrialist Matts Carlgren was majority shareholder of the hotel, which went bankrupt in 1998. The following year Lars Nilsson bought the hotel and the surrounding land, around 3,000 hectares (7,400 acres), for 37 million kronor. In July 2011, Stockholm real-estate investor Ulrich John bought the hotel and a substantial part of the mountain. The hotel did not open for the 2012–13 season, but a new owner has held it open during the 2013–14 season.

Storlien has been popular among visitors from the Norwegian county of Trøndelag, who go there for border shopping, mountain cabins, and skiing. After traditionally only having a small grocery store in the village centre, the shopping selection sharply increased in the 2010s, with a Coop Extra opening in 2011, and Eurocash in 2014, culminating in the shopping centre Fjellhandel opening in 2020.

== Ski area ==
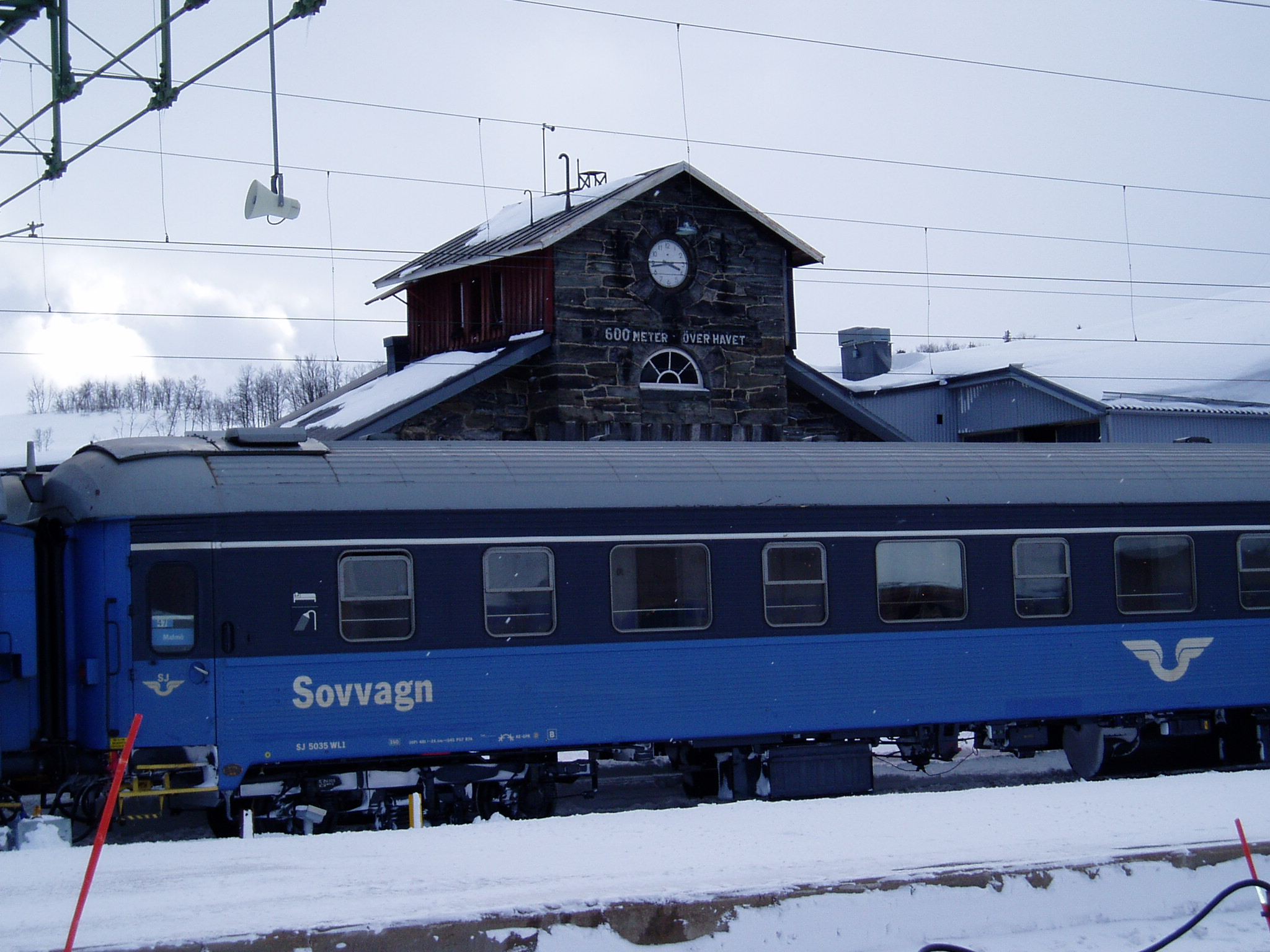
Storlien Station, in the centre of the village and the highest station in Sweden

The ski area at Storlien has nine lifts and 23 slopes. However, the vertical drop is a comparatively low 191 m (627 ft), and consequently the slopes are quite short. There are three children's areas with platter lifts and easy slopes, and night skiing under lights every Friday at Slalombacken.

== Climate ==
Storlien's climate is a maritime-influenced subarctic climate. Considering it being a ski resort, Storlien has a relatively mild winter climate, being influenced by the North Atlantic and its warming influence. This means that in spite of the relatively high elevation Storlien averages milder winters than the coastline of the Bothnian Bay on the east coast. It is also the Swedish weather station closest to the main Atlantic, if weather stations located by the shores of Kattegat and Skagerrak are excluded. Summers are also influenced by the elevated North Atlantic air with cool daytime temperatures and very cool and sometimes cold nights. Storlien receives plenty of precipitation by Swedish standards, peaking in July, August and September. However, winter precipitation is still significant enough to nearly guarantee skiing conditions. Especially during milder winters dominated the North Atlantic low pressure systems, snow accumulation can be very high. In May 2020, 148 centimetres (58 in) of snow was remaining on the ground in spite of being during late spring.

Storlien is cooled down sizeably by its elevation of 600 metres (2,000 ft), which renders summers a lot cooler than in coastal towns on similar latitudes such as Trondheim and Sundsvall in spite of being located in the interior.

Climate data for Storlien (2002–2020 averages; extremes since 1901)
Month	Jan	Feb	Mar	Apr	May	Jun	Jul	Aug	Sep	Oct	Nov	Dec	Year
Record high °C (°F)	9.1 (48.4)	7.8 (46.0)	9.0 (48.2)	15.4 (59.7)	27.7 (81.9)	29.3 (84.7)	30.0 (86.0)	28.0 (82.4)	26.5 (79.7)	19.9 (67.8)	12.2 (54.0)	9.1 (48.4)	30.0 (86.0)
Mean maximum °C (°F)	4.2 (39.6)	3.6 (38.5)	5.5 (41.9)	10.8 (51.4)	20.1 (68.2)	23.9 (75.0)	25.6 (78.1)	23.6 (74.5)	19.1 (66.4)	12.8 (55.0)	7.4 (45.3)	5.1 (41.2)	26.8 (80.2)
Mean daily maximum °C (°F)	−2.7 (27.1)	−2.6 (27.3)	−0.3 (31.5)	4.4 (39.9)	9.9 (49.8)	14.8 (58.6)	17.8 (64.0)	16.5 (61.7)	11.7 (53.1)	5.2 (41.4)	0.8 (33.4)	−1.4 (29.5)	6.2 (43.1)
Daily mean °C (°F)	−6.0 (21.2)	−5.8 (21.6)	−3.8 (25.2)	0.7 (33.3)	5.5 (41.9)	10.0 (50.0)	12.9 (55.2)	11.9 (53.4)	7.9 (46.2)	2.2 (36.0)	−2.2 (28.0)	−4.6 (23.7)	2.4 (36.3)
Mean daily minimum °C (°F)	−9.3 (15.3)	−9.0 (15.8)	−7.2 (19.0)	−3.0 (26.6)	1.1 (34.0)	5.2 (41.4)	8.0 (46.4)	7.3 (45.1)	4.0 (39.2)	−0.8 (30.6)	−5.1 (22.8)	−7.8 (18.0)	−1.4 (29.5)
Mean minimum °C (°F)	−23.2 (−9.8)	−23.3 (−9.9)	−20.2 (−4.4)	−12.8 (9.0)	−6.1 (21.0)	−0.3 (31.5)	1.9 (35.4)	0.6 (33.1)	−2.5 (27.5)	−11.3 (11.7)	−16.7 (1.9)	−20.1 (−4.2)	−27.2 (−17.0)
Record low °C (°F)	−39.5 (−39.1)	−36.3 (−33.3)	−35.0 (−31.0)	−27.0 (−16.6)	−19.0 (−2.2)	−6.0 (21.2)	−2.0 (28.4)	−6.2 (20.8)	−8.0 (17.6)	−25.0 (−13.0)	−34.0 (−29.2)	−38.8 (−37.8)	−39.5 (−39.1)
Average precipitation mm (inches)	73.6 (2.90)	63.0 (2.48)	68.4 (2.69)	49.2 (1.94)	53.2 (2.09)	83.1 (3.27)	92.2 (3.63)	91.8 (3.61)	111.7 (4.40)	76.2 (3.00)	61.5 (2.42)	79.5 (3.13)	903.4 (35.56)
Average extreme snow depth cm (inches)	75 (30)	94 (37)	109 (43)	102 (40)	51 (20)	4 (1.6)	0 (0)	0 (0)	2 (0.8)	16 (6.3)	30 (12)	49 (19)	113 (44)
Mean monthly sunshine hours	25	54	114	171	199	174	191	163	106	81	35	13	1,326
Source 1: SMHI Open Data
Source 2: SMHI climate data 2002–2020

== Transport ==
Storlien Station, in the centre of the village and at almost 600 m (2,000 ft) above sea level the highest in Sweden, is on the Central Line / Meråker Line which runs from Trondheim in Norway to Sundsvall in Sweden. Norrtåg operates trains between Sundsvall and Storlien. SJ Norge has trains between Trondheim and Storlien, so now Storlien is a border station where passengers need to change trains (the railway on the Norwegian side not being electrified). There are no night trains here anymore, they end in Duved now, but formerly there were night trains run all year in both directions between Storlien and Gothenburg, Stockholm and Malmö.

The closest airports are Trondheim Airport, Værnes, approximately 70 kilometres (43 mi) to the west in Norway, and Åre Östersund Airport, about 150 kilometres (93 mi) to the east. The E14 highway passes through Storlien.

== In popular culture ==
Storlien is mentioned in The Boys From Brazil.
