= Storlien railway station =

Railway station in Storlien, Sweden

Storlien
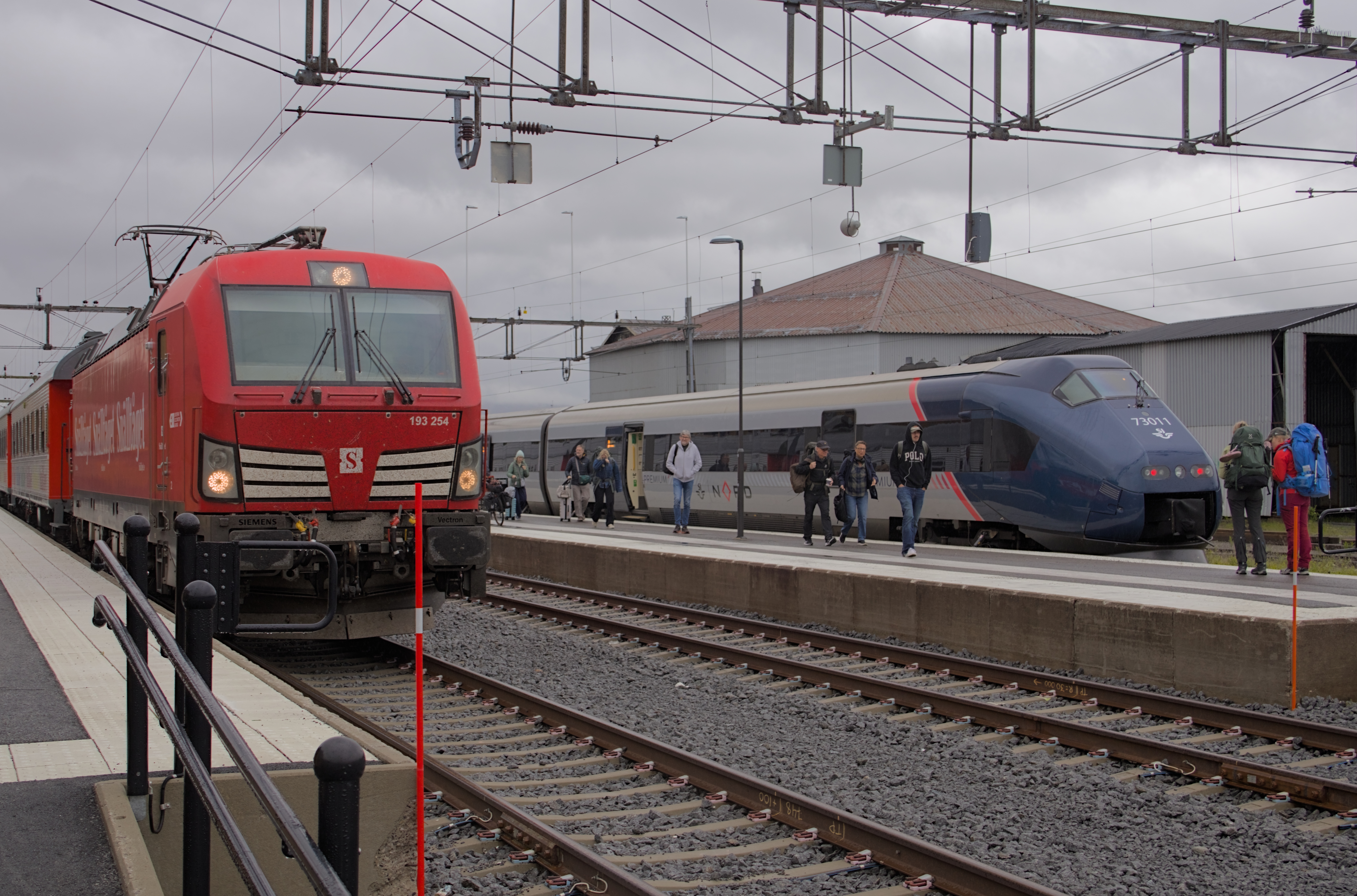
- Swedish and Norwegian trains at Storlien station

General information
- Location: Storlien, Åre; Sweden
- Coordinates: 63°18′59″N 12°5′57″E
- Elevation: 600 metres (2,000 ft)
- Owner: Jernhusen
- Operator: Trafikverket
- Lines: Central Line; Meråker Line
- Distance: 105.97 km (65.85 mi) (Trondheim S); 358 km (222 mi) (Sundsvall); 748.1 km (464.8 mi) (Stockholm C)

Construction
- Architect: Adolf W. Edelsvärd

Other information
- Station code: Str

History
- Opened: 1882
Location

Storlien Station (Swedish: Storlien station, Norwegian: Storlien stasjon) is a railway station located at Storlien in Åre Municipality, Sweden. Located 3.5 kilometres (2.2 mi) east of the Norway–Sweden border, it serves as changeover station between the Norwegian Meråker Line and the Swedish Central Line (the actual ownership border and name change between the lines is at the national border). The altitude is 592 metres (1,942 ft), the highest located station in Sweden. The station is 105.97 kilometres (65.85 mi) from Trondheim, 358 kilometres (222 mi) from Sundsvall and 748.1 kilometres (464.8 mi) from Stockholm. The station and entire line Östersund–Trondheim was inaugurated by the king Oscar II in Storlien 1882. The village of Storlien is primarily a ski resort and border shopping place.

SJ Norge operates regional trains from Trondheim Central Station, and Norrtåg (Vy Tåg) operates regional trains from Sundsvall Central Station via Östersund Central Station, both twice a day, connecting at Storlien. The Swedish railway was electrified up to the border in 1945, the Norwegian line was not until late 2025.

Preceding station	Norrtåg	Following station
Terminus	Central Line	Enafors towards Sundsvall C
Preceding station	Long distance trains	Following station
Terminus	Snälltåget	Enafors towards Malmö Central
Preceding station	Regional trains	Following station
Kopperå towards Trondheim S	R71	Terminus
