= Sona, Norway =

Village in Stjørdal Municipality, Norway

Sona
- Village
- Interactive map of Sona
- Location within Trøndelag Location within Norway
- Coordinates: 63.4389°N 11.2539°E
- Country: Norway
- Region: Central Norway
- County: Trøndelag
- District: Stjørdalen
- Municipality: Stjørdal Municipality
- Elevation: 38 m (125 ft)
- Time zone: UTC+01:00 (CET)
  - Summer (DST): UTC+02:00 (CEST)
- Post Code: 7520 Hegra

Sona is a village in Stjørdal Municipality in Trøndelag county, Norway. It is located in the eastern part of the municipality, about 20 kilometres (12 mi) east of the town of Stjørdalshalsen. It lies along the Stjørdalselva river about half-way between the villages of Hegra and Flornes. The Meråkerbanen railway line used to stop here at Sona Station, and the European route E14 highway also runs through the village.
