= Hegra Municipality =

Former municipality in Trøndelag, Norway

Hegra Municipality Hegra herad
- Former municipality
- Hegre herred (historic name)
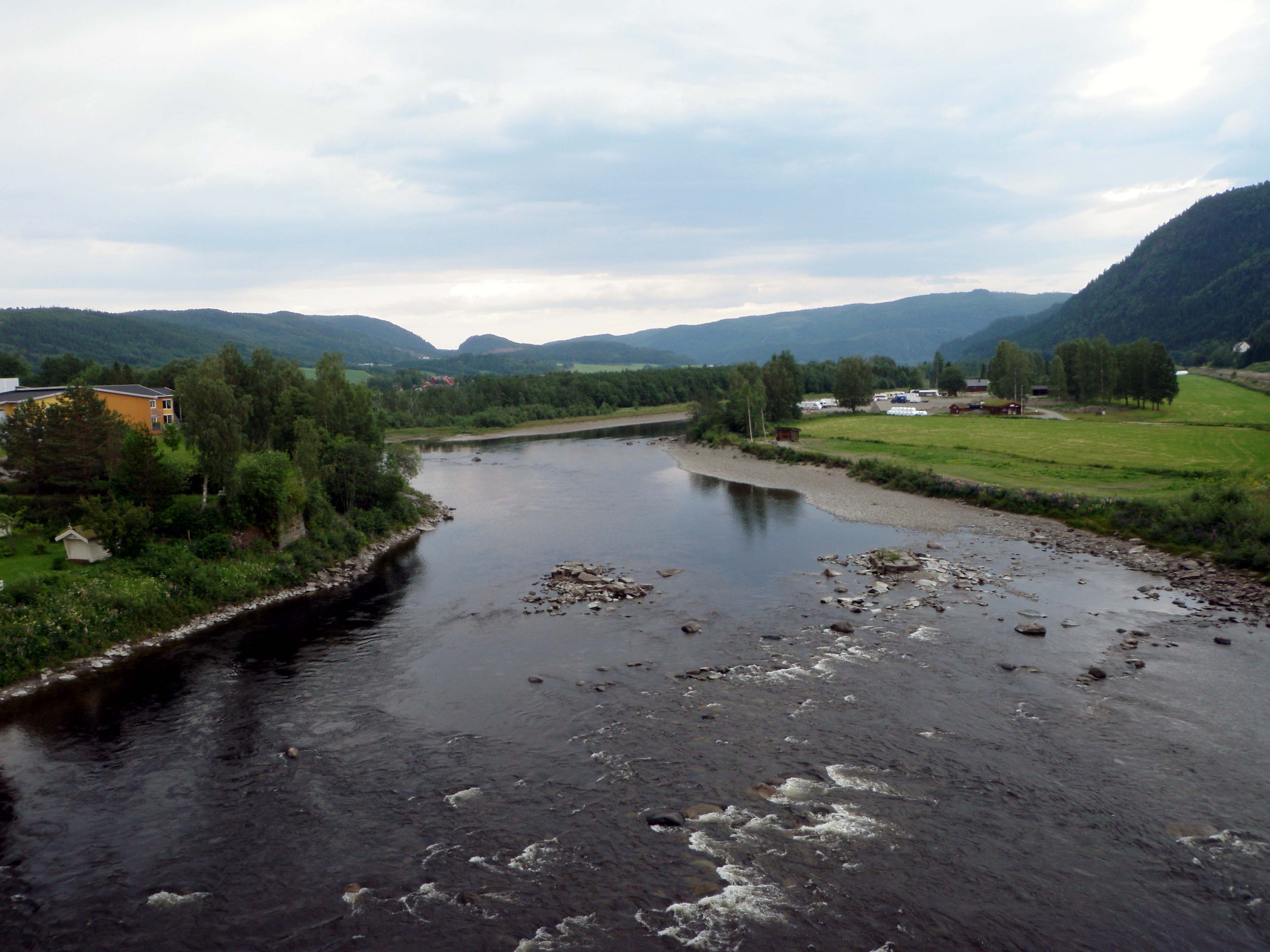
- View of the river Stjørdalselva at Hegra

- Nord-Trøndelag within Norway

- Hegra within Nord-Trøndelag
- Coordinates: 63°27′50″N 11°06′51″E
- Country: Norway
- County: Nord-Trøndelag
- District: Stjørdalen
- Established: 1 Jan 1874
  - Preceded by: Øvre Stjørdalen Municipality
- Disestablished: 1 Jan 1962
  - Succeeded by: Stjørdal Municipality
- Administrative centre: Hegra

Government
  - Mayor (1960–1961): Jon Leirfall (Sp)

Area (upon dissolution)
  - Total: 612.4 km^{2} (236.4 sq mi)
  - Rank: #159 in Norway
- Highest elevation: 1,171.31 m (3,842.9 ft)

Population (1961)
  - Total: 2,762
  - Rank: #337 in Norway
  - Density: 4.5/km^{2} (12/sq mi)
  - Change (10 years): ▼ −1.4%
- Demonym: Hegrasbygg

Official language
  - Norwegian form: Neutral
- Time zone: UTC+01:00 (CET)
  - Summer (DST): UTC+02:00 (CEST)
- ISO 3166 code: NO-1712

Hegra is a former municipality in the old Nord-Trøndelag county, Norway. The 612-square-kilometre (236 sq mi) municipality existed from 1874 until its dissolution in 1962. The municipality was located in the Stjørdalen valley. It encompassed the eastern two-thirds of the what is now Stjørdal Municipality in Trøndelag county. The administrative centre was the village of Hegra where the Hegra Church is located.

Prior to its dissolution in 1962, the 612.4-square-kilometre (236.4 sq mi) municipality was the 159th largest by area out of the 731 municipalities in Norway. Hegra Municipality was the 337th most populous municipality in Norway with a population of about 2,762. The municipality's population density was 4.5 inhabitants per square kilometre (12/sq mi) and its population had decreased by 1.5% over the previous 10-year period.

== General information ==
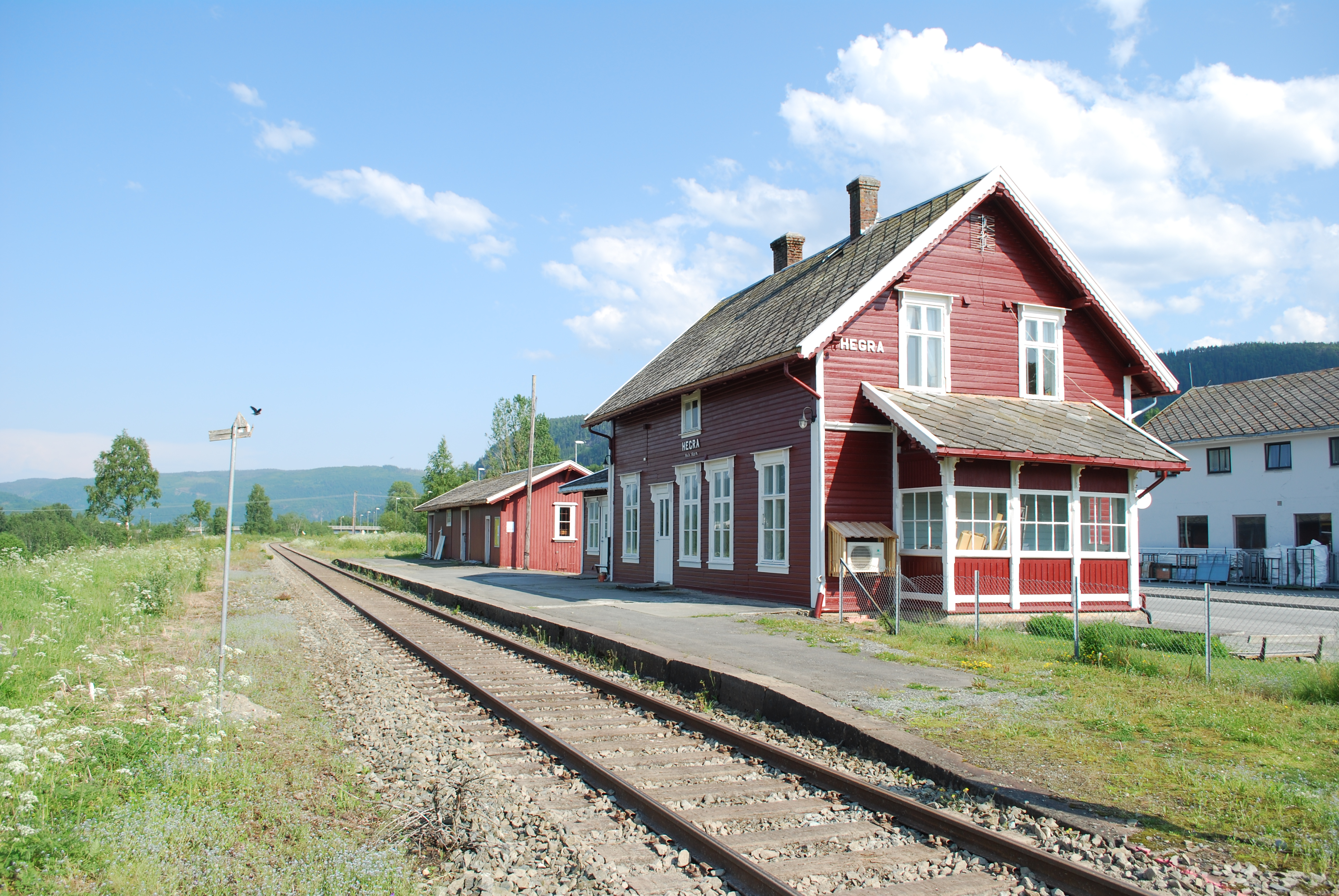
View of the Hegra Station

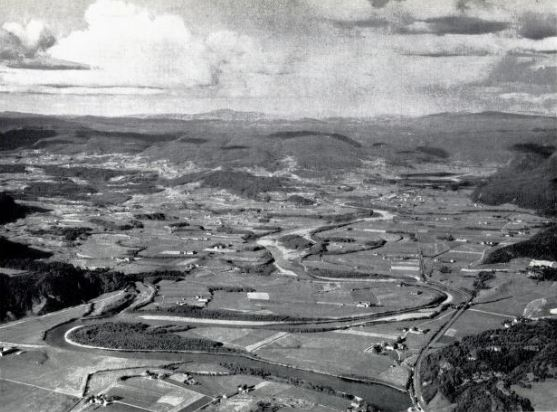
Aerial view of the Hegra area (c. 1957)

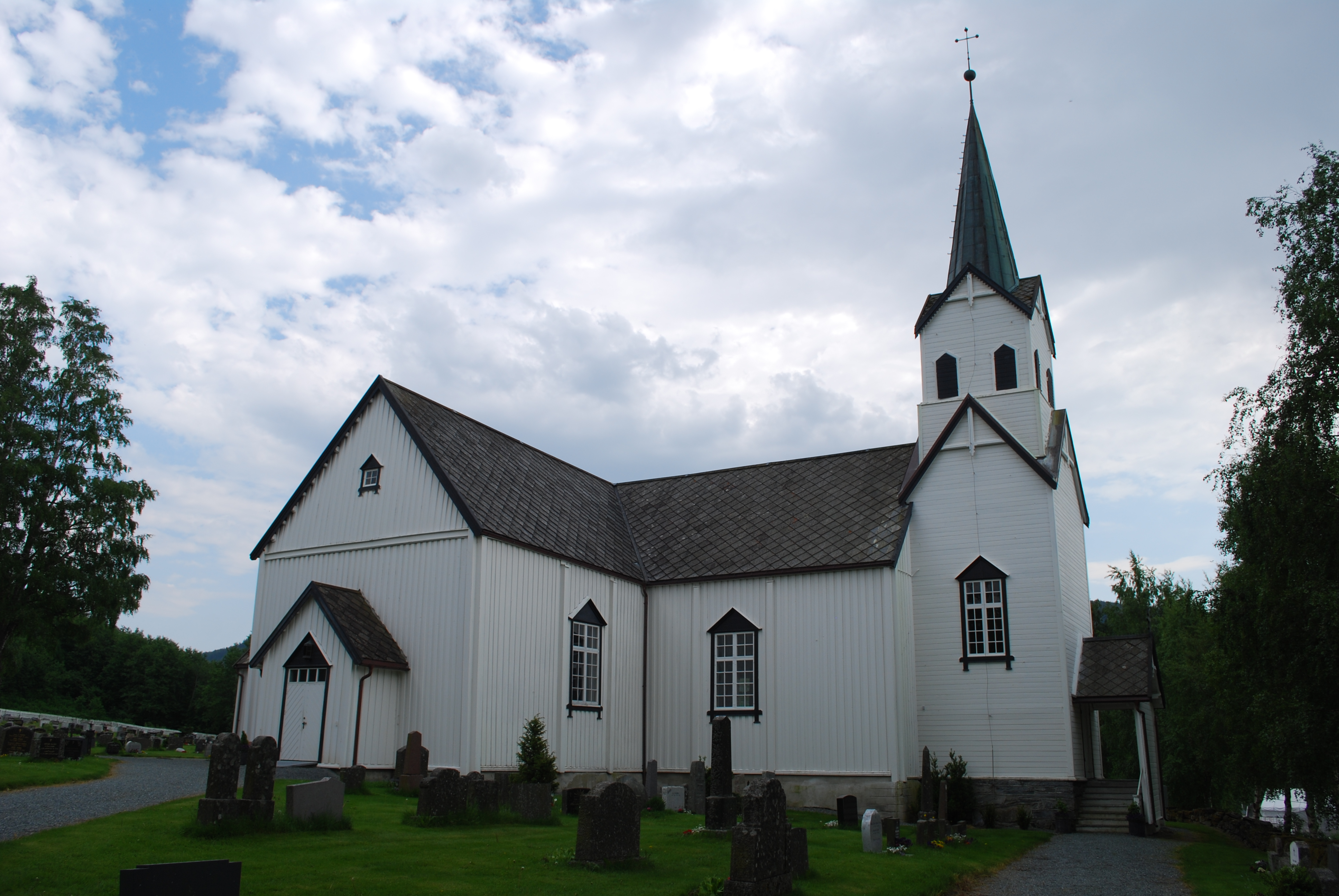
View of Hegra Church, the main church for the municipality

The municipality of Hegra was established on 1 January 1874 when the old Øvre Stjørdalen Municipality was divided in two: Meråker Municipality (population: 1,861) in the east and Hegra Municipality (population: 3,409) in the west. During the 1960s, there were many municipal mergers across Norway due to the work of the Schei Committee. On 1 January 1962, Hegra Municipality (population: 2,704) was merged with the neighboring Lånke Municipality (population: 1,967), Skatval Municipality (population: 1,944), and Stjørdal Municipality (population: 6,204) to form a new, larger Stjørdal Municipality.

=== Name ===
The municipality (originally the parish) is named after the old Hegre farm (Old Norse: Hegrin) since the first Hegra Church was built there. The name was originally a compound of two words. The first element is named after the local river Hegra. The river name is based on the word hegri which means "heron". The last element is vin which means "meadow" or "pasture". Thus the name means something like "heron meadow".

Historically, the name of the municipality was spelled Hegre. On 3 November 1917, a royal resolution changed the spelling of the name of the municipality to Hegra.

=== Churches ===
The Church of Norway had one parish (sokn) within Hegra Municipality. At the time of the municipal dissolution, it was part of the Øvre Stjørdal prestegjeld and the Stjørdal prosti (deanery) in the Diocese of Nidaros.

Churches in Hegra Municipality
| Parish (sokn) | Church name | Location of the church | Year built |
|---|---|---|---|
| Hegra | Hegra Church | Hegra | 1783 |
| Hegra | Floren Chapel | Flornes | 1902 |
| Hegra | Okkelberg Chapel | Skjelstadmarka | 1905 |

== Geography ==
The highest point in the municipality was the 1,171.31-metre (3,842.9 ft) tall mountain Storskarven, located on a tripoint border with Meråker Municipality, Selbu Municipality, and this municipality.

== Government ==
While it existed, Hegra Municipality was responsible for primary education (through 10th grade), outpatient health services, senior citizen services, welfare and other social services, zoning, economic development, and municipal roads and utilities. The municipality was governed by a municipal council of directly elected representatives. The mayor was indirectly elected by a vote of the municipal council. The municipality was under the jurisdiction of the Frostating Court of Appeal.

=== Municipal council ===
The municipal council (Herredsstyre) of Hegra Municipality was made up of 21 representatives that were elected to four year terms. The tables below show the historical composition of the council by political party.

Hegra herredsstyre 1959–1963
| Party name (in Norwegian) | Number of representatives |
|---|---|
| Labour Party (Arbeiderpartiet) | 9 |
| Conservative Party (Høyre) | 2 |
| Christian Democratic Party (Kristelig Folkeparti) | 2 |
| Centre Party (Senterpartiet) | 5 |
| Liberal Party (Venstre) | 3 |
| Total number of members: | 21 |

Hegra herredsstyre 1955–1959
| Party name (in Norwegian) | Number of representatives |
|---|---|
| Labour Party (Arbeiderpartiet) | 10 |
| Conservative Party (Høyre) | 1 |
| Christian Democratic Party (Kristelig Folkeparti) | 2 |
| Farmers' Party (Bondepartiet) | 5 |
| Liberal Party (Venstre) | 3 |
| Total number of members: | 21 |

Hegra herredsstyre 1951–1955
| Party name (in Norwegian) | Number of representatives |
|---|---|
| Labour Party (Arbeiderpartiet) | 8 |
| Conservative Party (Høyre) | 1 |
| Christian Democratic Party (Kristelig Folkeparti) | 2 |
| Farmers' Party (Bondepartiet) | 5 |
| Liberal Party (Venstre) | 4 |
| Total number of members: | 20 |

Hegra herredsstyre 1947–1951
| Party name (in Norwegian) | Number of representatives |
|---|---|
| Labour Party (Arbeiderpartiet) | 8 |
| Christian Democratic Party (Kristelig Folkeparti) | 2 |
| Farmers' Party (Bondepartiet) | 6 |
| Liberal Party (Venstre) | 4 |
| Total number of members: | 20 |

Hegra herredsstyre 1945–1947
| Party name (in Norwegian) | Number of representatives |
|---|---|
| Labour Party (Arbeiderpartiet) | 9 |
| Christian Democratic Party (Kristelig Folkeparti) | 2 |
| Farmers' Party (Bondepartiet) | 5 |
| Liberal Party (Venstre) | 4 |
| Total number of members: | 20 |

Hegra herredsstyre 1937–1941*
| Party name (in Norwegian) | Number of representatives |
|---|---|
| Labour Party (Arbeiderpartiet) | 7 |
| Farmers' Party (Bondepartiet) | 7 |
| Liberal Party (Venstre) | 6 |
| Total number of members: | 20 |
Note: Due to the German occupation of Norway during World War II, no elections were held for new municipal councils until after the war ended in 1945.

=== Mayors ===
The mayor (Norwegian: ordfører) of Hegra Municipality was the political leader of the municipality and the chairperson of the municipal council. Here is a list of people who held this position:

- 1874–1889: Olav Torsteinsen Bjørgum (V)
- 1890–1893: Mikal Setsaas (V)
- 1894–1897: John Halvorsen Øverkil (V)
- 1898–1898: Gunerius Pedersen Hofstad (V)
- 1899–1910: Ole Gundersen (H)
- 1911–1922: John Lerfald (Bp/V)
- 1923–1937: Torstein Mørseth (V)
- 1938–1941: Johan Peter Trøite (V)
- 1941–1941: Gunnar Børset (Bp)
- 1941–1944: Lars O. Setran (NS)
- 1944–1945: Anders Ingstad (NS)
- 1945–1945: Johan Peter Trøite (V)
- 1946–1947: Ole J. Hofstad (Bp)
- 1948–1951: Magne Bremseth (Ap)
- 1952–1955: Lars Bidtnes (V)
- 1956–1957: Johan Fornes (Bp)
- 1958–1959: Karl Kringen (Ap)
- 1960–1961: Jon Leirfall (Sp)

== See also ==
- List of former municipalities of Norway
