= Flornes =

Village in Stjørdal Municipality, Norway

Flornes Flora / Floren
- Village
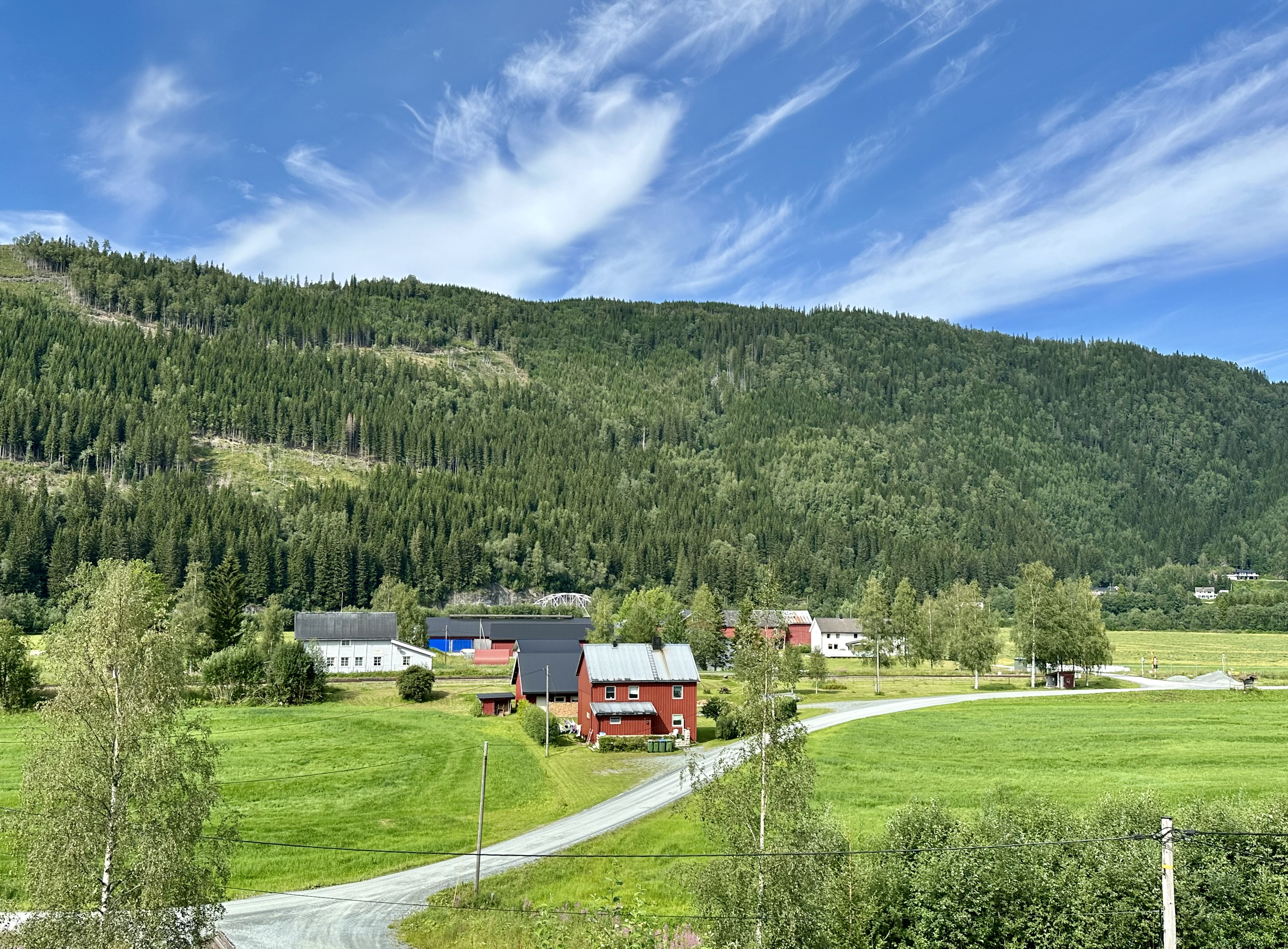
- View of the village
- Interactive map of Flornes
- Location within Trøndelag Location within Norway
- Coordinates: 63.4581°N 11.3529°E
- Country: Norway
- Region: Central Norway
- County: Trøndelag
- District: Stjørdalen
- Municipality: Stjørdal Municipality
- Elevation: 42 m (138 ft)
- Time zone: UTC+01:00 (CET)
  - Summer (DST): UTC+02:00 (CEST)
- Post Code: 7525 Flornes

Flornes is a village in Stjørdal Municipality in Trøndelag county, Norway. It is located in the western part of the municipality along the Stjørdalselva river, about 25 kilometres (16 mi) east of the town of Stjørdalshalsen. The village of Sona lies to the west and the village of Gudå (in Meråker Municipality) lies to the east.

The village is the location of Floren Chapel. The Meråkerbanen railway line used to stop here at Flornes Station, and the European route E14 highway also runs through the village.
