= Hegra (disambiguation) =

Hegra is an archaeological site in the area of al-Ula in the Hijaz, Saudi Arabia. It may also refer to:

- Hegra, Norway, village in Stjørdal Municipality in Trøndelag county, Norway
  - Hegra Church, Lutheran parish church in the village of Hegra
  - Hegra Station, railway station in the village of Hegra
  - Hegra Fortress, former mountain fortress in the village of Hegra
    - Battle of Hegra Fortress, battle fought there in 1940 during World War II
- Hegra Municipality, former municipality in the old Nord-Trøndelag county, Norway
- HEGRA (High-Energy-Gamma-Ray Astronomy), an atmospheric Cherenkov telescope for Gamma-ray astronomy
