= Øvre Stjørdalen Municipality =

Former municipality in Trøndelag, Norway

Øvre Stjørdalen Municipality Øvre Stjørdalen herad
- Former municipality
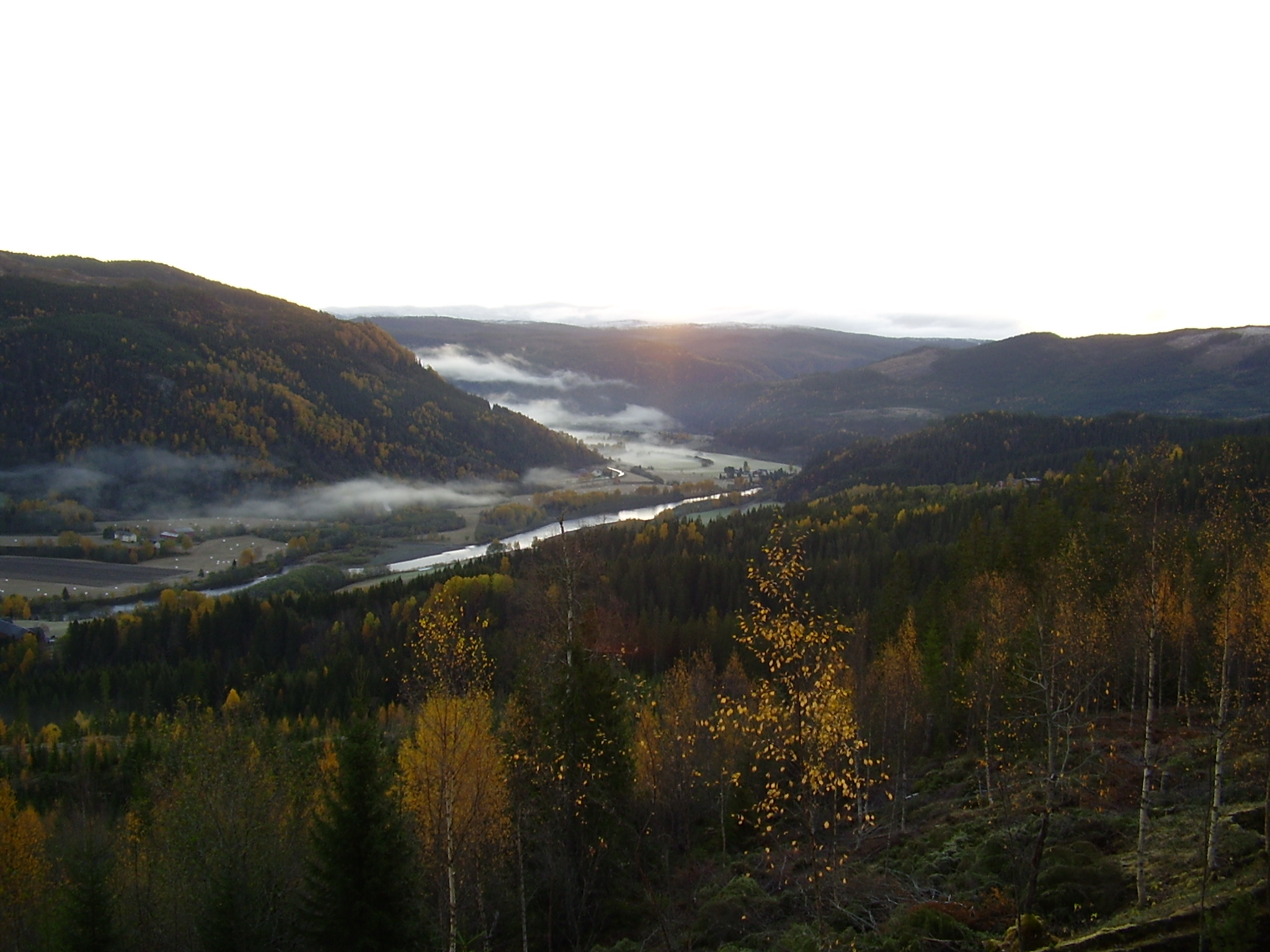
- View of the Stjørdalen valley

- Nord-Trøndelag within Norway

- Øvre Stjørdalen within Nord-Trøndelag
- Coordinates: 63.4656°N 11.4955°E
- Country: Norway
- County: Nord-Trøndelag
- District: Stjørdalen
- Established: 1850
  - Preceded by: Stjørdalen Municipality
- Disestablished: 1 Jan 1874
  - Succeeded by: Hegra Municipality and Meråker Municipality
- Administrative centre: Hegra

Government
  - Mayor (1869–1873): Halvor Johnsen Øverkil

Area (upon dissolution)
  - Total: 1,913 km^{2} (739 sq mi)
- Highest elevation: 1,441.36 m (4,728.9 ft)

Population (1874)
  - Total: 1,861
  - Density: 0.9728/km^{2} (2.520/sq mi)
- Demonym: Stjørdaling
- Time zone: UTC+01:00 (CET)
  - Summer (DST): UTC+02:00 (CEST)
- ISO 3166 code: NO-1711

Øvre Stjørdalen is a former municipality in the old Nordre Trondhjem county in Norway. The 1,913-square-kilometre (739 sq mi) municipality existed from 1850 until its dissolution in 1874. The municipality encompassed the upper part of the Stjørdalen valley which includes what is now Meråker Municipality and the eastern part of Stjørdal Municipality, both in Trøndelag county. The administrative centre of the municipality was the village of Hegra where the Hegra Church is located.

== General information ==
The municipality was established in 1850 when the old Stjørdalen Municipality was divided into Øvre Stjørdalen Municipality (population: 5,100) and Nedre Stjørdalen Municipality (population: 6,543). On 1 January 1874, Øvre Stjørdalen Municipality ceased to exist when it was split to form two new municipalities: Hegra Municipality (population: 3,409) in the east and Meraker Municipality (population: 1,861) in the west.

=== Name ===
The municipality (originally the parish) is named after the Stjørdalen valley (Old Norse: Stjórardalr). The first element is the word Øvre which means "upper", referring to the fact that it is the upper part of the valley. The second element is the genitive case of the local river name Stjór (now called the Stjørdalselva river). The meaning of the river name is unknown. The last element is dalr which means "valley" or "dale".

=== Churches ===
The Church of Norway had one parish (sokn) within Øvre Stjørdalen Municipality. At the time of the municipal dissolution, it was part of the Øvre Stjørdal prestegjeld and the Søndre Innherred prosti (deanery) in the Diocese of Nidaros.

Churches in Øvre Stjørdalen Municipality
| Parish (sokn) | Church name | Location of the church | Year built |
|---|---|---|---|
| Hegra | Hegra Church | Hegra | 1783 |
| Meråker | Meråker Church | Meråker | 1874 |
| Meråker | Stordalen Chapel | Stordalen | 1863 |

== Geography ==
The municipality made up the upper part of the Stjørdalen valley. Verdal Municipality, Skogn Municipality and Åsen Municipality were to the north, Nedre Stjørdalen Municipality was the to west, Selbu Municipality and Tydal Municipality (both in Søndre Trondhjem county) were to the south, and Sweden was to the east. The highest point in the municipality was the 1,441.36-metre (4,728.9 ft) tall mountain Fongen, located on the tripoint border with Selbu Municipality, Tydal Municipality, and this municipality.

== Government ==
While it existed, Øvre Stjørdalen Municipality was governed by a municipal council of directly elected representatives. The municipal council (Herredsstyre) of Øvre Stjørdalen was made up of representatives that were elected to four year terms. The mayor was indirectly elected by a vote of the municipal council. The municipality was under the jurisdiction of the Frostating Court of Appeal.

=== Mayors ===
The mayor (Norwegian: ordfører) of Øvre Stjørdalen Municipality was the political leader of the municipality and the chairperson of the municipal council. Here is a list of people who held this position:

- 1850–1851: Haftor Gundersen Skjelstad
- 1851–1853: Halvor Johnsen Øverkil
- 1854–1857: Sivert Andreas Fergstad
- 1858–1861: Johannes Røyem
- 1862–1865: Jens Henrik Winsnes
- 1866–1869: Johannes Røyem
- 1869–1873: Halvor Johnsen Øverkil

== See also ==
- List of former municipalities of Norway
