= Stjørdalen Municipality =

Former municipality in Trøndelag, Norway

Stjørdalen Municipality Stjørdalen herred
- Former municipality
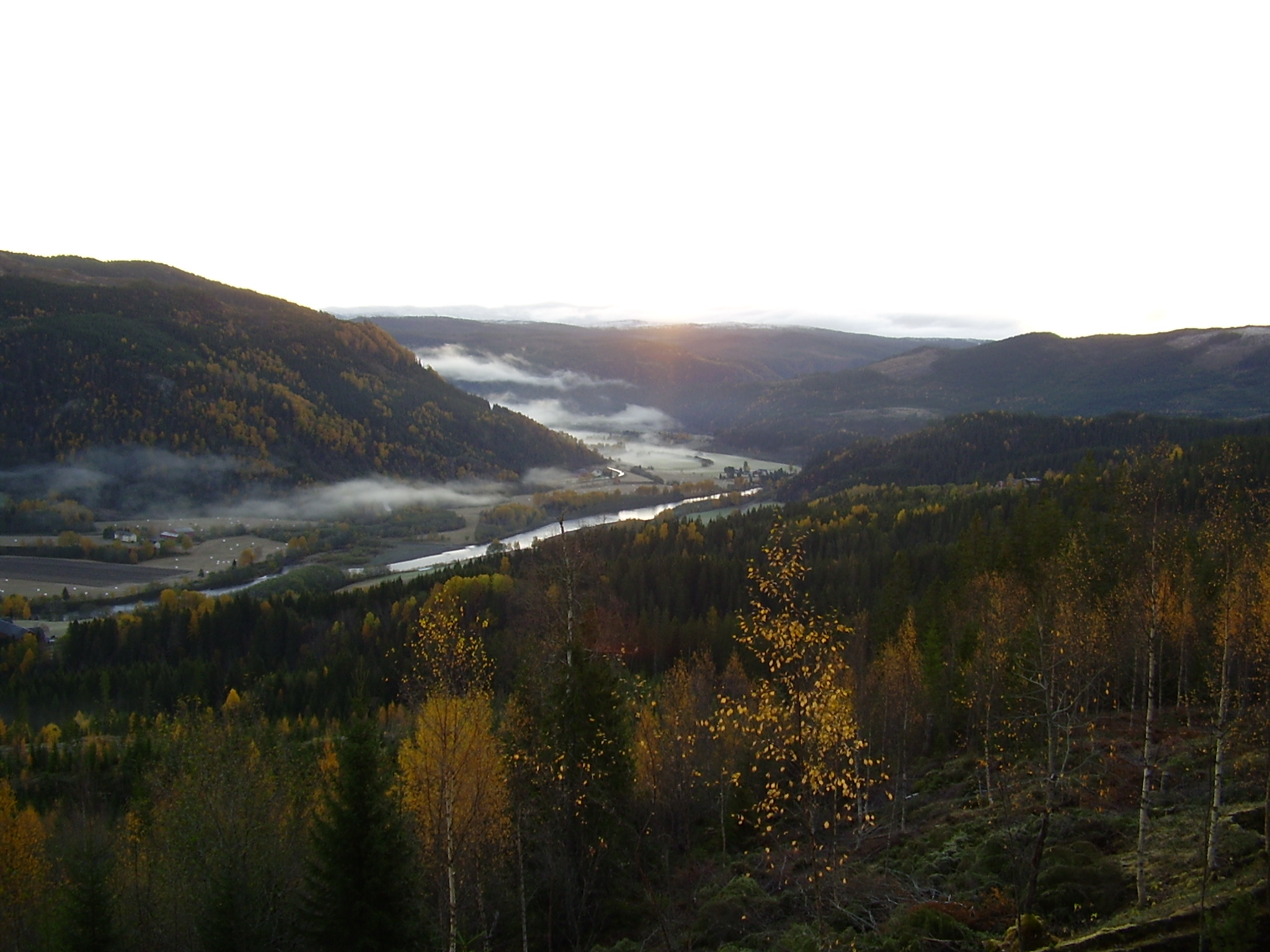
- View of the Stjørdalen valley

- Nord-Trøndelag within Norway

- Stjørdalen within Nord-Trøndelag
- Coordinates: 63.4570°N 11.0078°E
- Country: Norway
- County: Nord-Trøndelag
- District: Stjørdalen
- Established: 1 Jan 1838
  - Created as: Formannskapsdistrikt
- Disestablished: 1850
  - Succeeded by: Øvre Stjørdalen Municipality and Nedre Stjørdalen Municipality
- Administrative centre: Værnes

Government
  - Mayor (1846–1849): Sivert Andreas Fergstad

Area (upon dissolution)
  - Total: 2,253 km^{2} (870 sq mi)
- Highest elevation: 1,441.36 m (4,728.9 ft)

Population (1850)
  - Total: 11,643
  - Density: 5.168/km^{2} (13.38/sq mi)
- Demonym: Stjørdaling
- Time zone: UTC+01:00 (CET)
  - Summer (DST): UTC+02:00 (CEST)
- ISO 3166 code: NO-1714

Stjørdalen is a former municipality in the old Nordre Trondhjem county in Norway. The 2,253-square-kilometre (870 sq mi) municipality existed from 1838 until its dissolution in 1850. The municipality covered the whole Stjørdalen valley in what is now Stjørdal Municipality and Meråker Municipality in Trøndelag county. The administrative centre was located at Værnes where Værnes Church is located.

== General information ==
The parish of Stjørdalen was established as a municipality on 1 January 1838 (see formannskapsdistrikt law). In 1850, Stjørdalen Municipality was divided into Øvre Stjørdalen Municipality (population: 5,100), comprising the upper/inland half of the valley and Nedre Stjørdalen Municipality (population: 6,543), comprising the lower/coastal half of the valley.

=== Name ===
The municipality (originally the parish) is named after the Stjørdalen valley (Old Norse: Stjórardalr). The first element is the genitive case of the local river name Stjór (now called the Stjørdalselva river). The meaning of the river name is unknown. The last element is dalr which means "valley" or "dale".

=== Churches ===
The Church of Norway had one parish (sokn) within Stjørdalen Municipality. At the time of the municipal dissolution, it was part of the Stjørdalen prestegjeld and the Søndre Innherred prosti (deanery) in the Diocese of Nidaros.

Churches in Stjørdalen Municipality
Parish (sokn)	Church name	Location of the church	Year built
Øvre Stjørdalen	Hegra Church	Hegra	1783
Øvre Stjørdalen	Meråker Church	Meråker	1793*
Nedre Stjørdalen	Lånke Church	Hell	1600s*
Nedre Stjørdalen	Skatval Church	Skatval	1767*
Nedre Stjørdalen	Værnes Church	Prestmoen	c. 1100s
*Note: The church was later rebuilt after this municipality was dissolved.

== Geography ==
The highest point in the municipality was the 1,441.36-metre (4,728.9 ft) tall mountain Fongen, located on the tripoint border between Stjørdalen Municipality, Selbu Municipality, and Tydal Municipality.

== Government ==
While it existed, Stjørdalen Municipality was governed by a municipal council of directly elected representatives. The municipal council (Herredsstyret) of Stjørdalen was made up of representatives that were elected to four-year terms. The mayor was indirectly elected by a vote of the municipal council. The municipality was under the jurisdiction of the Frostating Court of Appeal.

=== Mayors ===
The mayor (Norwegian: ordfører) of Stjørdalen Municipality was the political leader of the municipality and the chairperson of the municipal council. Here is a list of people who held this position:

- 1838–1841: Tobias Brodtkorb Bernhoft
- 1842–1843: Halvor Bachke
- 1844–1845: Ole Øvre Richter
- 1846–1849: Sivert Andreas Fergstad

== See also ==
- List of former municipalities of Norway
