= Gudå =

Gudå Gudåa
- Village
- Location of the village Gudå (Norway)
- Coordinates: 63.4434°N 11.6203°E
- Country: Norway
- Region: Central Norway
- County: Trøndelag
- District: Stjørdalen
- Municipality: Meråker
- Elevation: 87 m (285 ft)
- Time zone: UTC+01:00 (CET)
  - Summer (DST): UTC+02:00 (CEST)
- Post Code: 7530 Meråker

Gudå or Gudåa is a village in the municipality of Meråker in Trøndelag county, Norway. It is located along the river Stjørdalselva, about 7.5 kilometres (4.7 mi) west of the municipal center of Midtbygda. The village is served by Gudå Station on the Meråker Line railway as well as the European route E14 highway. Gudåa has a camping ground and it is a popular fishing spot for salmon.
