= Sona Station =

Railway station in Stjørdal, Norway

Sona Station Sona stasjon

General information
- Location: Sona, Stjørdal Municipality; Trøndelag; Norway
- Coordinates: 63.4389°N 11.2539°E
- System: Railway station
- Owner: Norwegian State Railways
- Line: Meråkerbanen
- Distance: 51.07 kilometres (31.73 mi)
- Platforms: 1

History
- Opened: 31 December 1897
- Closed: 13 June 1993
Location
- Location within Trøndelag Location within Norway

Sona Station (Norwegian: Sona stasjon) was a railway station on the Meråker Line in the village of Sona in Stjørdal Municipality in Trøndelag county, Norway. The station was opened on 31 December 1897. It has been unstaffed since 1 March 1971.

Preceding station		Following station
Hegra	Meråker Line	Gudå; Flornes
