= Flornes Station =

Railway station in Stjørdal, Norway

Flornes Station Flornes stasjon

General information
- Location: Flornes, Stjørdal Municipality; Trøndelag; Norway
- Coordinates: 63.4582°N 11.3511°E
- Elevation: 46 metres (151 ft)
- System: Railway station
- Owner: Norwegian State Railways
- Line: Meråkerbanen
- Distance: 59.07 kilometres (36.70 mi)
- Platforms: 1

History
- Opened: 17 October 1881
- Closed: 13 June 1993
Location
- Location within Trøndelag Location within Norway

Flornes Station (Norwegian: Flornes stasjon) was a railway station on the Meråker Line in the village of Flornes in Stjørdal Municipality in Trøndelag county, Norway. The station was opened on 17 October 1881 as Floren. It changed name to Flora in April 1921, and to the current on 11 September 1934. It has been unstaffed since 1 March 1971 and on 13 June 1993, the station was closed.

Preceding station		Following station
Hegra; Sona	Meråker Line	Gudå
