= Floren =

Floren or Florén is a surname. Floren is also a given name. Notable people with the name include:

== People with the given name ==
- Floren Delbene, Argentine actor

== People with the surname ==
- Fredrik Florén (born 1971), Swedish diplomat
- Jesper Florén, Swedish footballer
- Livvy Floren, American politician
- Mathias Florén, Swedish footballer
- Myron Floren, American musician
- Oscar Florén, Swedish golfer

== See also ==
- Floren Chapel, a church in Flornes, Norway
