= Andreas Fleischer =

Norwegian Lutheran bishop (1878–1957)

The Right Reverend Andreas Fleischer
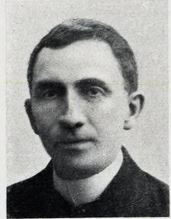

Personal details
- Born: 5 November 1878 Hegra, Norway
- Died: 23 November 1957 (aged 79) Vikedal, Norway
- Denomination: Church of Norway
- Occupation: Priest
- Education: Cand.theol. (University of Oslo)

Andreas Fleischer (5 November 1878–23 November 1957) was a Norwegian theologian, missionary to China, and Lutheran Bishop. He was born in Hegra, Norway, and was a brother to General Carl Gustav Fleischer. He was Bishop of the Diocese of Bjørgvin from 1932 to 1949. He wrote several books during his lifetime, including some in Chinese.

== Early life ==
Andreas Fleischer was born in the village of Hegra in Nord-Trøndelag county, Norway on 5 November 1878. His father was a pastor, Carl Edvard Fleischer and his mother was Johanne Sophie Fergstad. He went to school in Trondheim, graduating in 1896. He then went to the University of Oslo and received his Cand.theol. degree in 1902.

== Career ==
Fleischer's first job was as a priest in Trondheim in 1903. This position was not long lasting. In 1904, Fleischer moved to China to become a missionary in Hunan province. While in China in 1908, he married Petra Amalie Margreta Ulsaker, the daughter of another Norwegian minister. He worked there until 1912, shortly after the Xinhai Revolution in China. After returning to Norway, he worked in several parishes as a priest: in Fitjar Church from 1912-1917, Stord Church from 1917-1922, and the churches in Brunlanes prestegjeld from 1922-1932. In 1932, he was appointed as Bishop for the Diocese of Bjørgvin. After retiring in 1948, he traveled the country as a speaker for the Norwegian Missionary Society, speaking about missions and his history as a missionary in China. He died in the village of Vikedal in Rogaland county on 23 November 1957.

Church of Norway titles
Preceded by Peter Hognestad	Bishop of Bjørgvin; 1931–1948	Succeeded by Ragnvald Indrebø
