= Jon Leirfall =

Norwegian politician

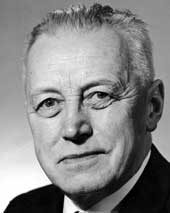
Jon Leirfall.

Jon Leirfall (7 October 1899 – 12 June 1998) was a Norwegian politician for the Centre Party.

He was elected to the Norwegian Parliament from Nord-Trøndelag in 1945, and was re-elected on five occasions. He had previously been a deputy representative from 1937 to 1945. He was secretary general of the Farmer's Party in 1933 and was succeeded by Hans Holten.

Leirfall was born in Hegra and served as mayor of Hegra Municipality from 1959–1961, and was thus its last mayor before its incorporation into Stjørdal Municipality in 1962. Leirfall was then a member of the municipal council of Stjørdal Municipality in the periods 1961–1963 and 1963–1967.

Leirfall wrote a history of the Isle of Man, A Thousand Years in Man, from a Norwegian perspective. It was translated into English by the Manx linguist and scholar Jennifer Kewley Draskau in 2019.

Leirfall also wrote several saga-pastiches, satirizing Norwegian politics, with his political friends and enemies thinly disguised as vikings and berserkers.
