= Johan Peter Trøite =

Norwegian politician

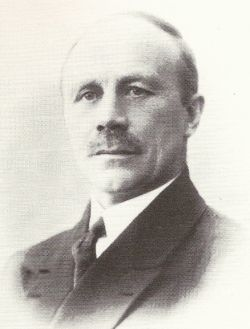
- Born: 22 March 1880; Hegra, Norway
- Died: 14 March 1977 (aged 96)
- Occupation: Politician

Johan Peter Trøite (22 March 1880 – 14 March 1977) was a Norwegian politician.

He was born in Hegra to Nils Pedersen Hegre and Randi Rollaugsdatter Bjørngaard. He was elected representative to the Storting for the period 1937–1945, for the Liberal Party. He was a member of Hegra municipal council from 1916 to 1941, serving the last four years as mayor.
