= Gudå Station =

Railway station in Meråker, Norway

Gudå Station Gudå stasjon
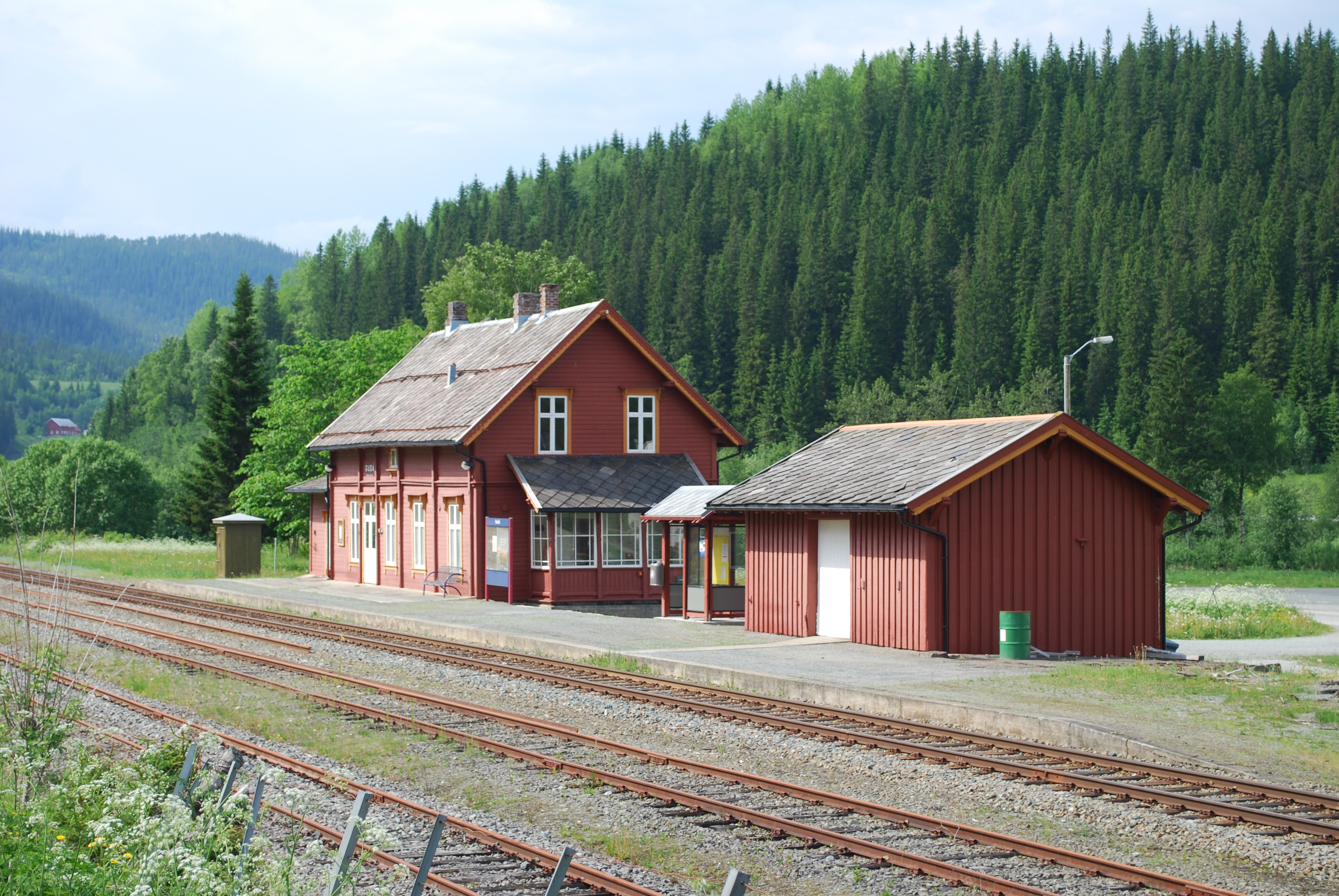
- View of the station

General information
- Location: Gudå, Meråker Municipality; Trøndelag; Norway
- Coordinates: 63.443731°N 11.617976°E
- Elevation: 85.3 metres (280 ft)
- System: Railway station
- Owner: Bane NOR
- Operator: SJ Norge
- Line: Meråkerbanen
- Distance: 72.02 kilometres (44.75 mi)
- Platforms: 1

Other information
- Station code: GU

History
- Opened: 17 October 1881
Location
- Location within Trøndelag Location within Norway

Gudå Station (Norwegian: Gudå stasjon) is a railway station on the Meråker Line at the village of Gudå in Meråker Municipality in Trøndelag county, Norway. The station was opened on 17 October 1881 as Gudaa. It was renamed Gudaaen in 1894, and received the current name in April 1924.

The station has been unstaffed since 1 February 1982. It is served twice a day in each direction by SJ Norge. The station is owned by Bane NOR. It is located 72 kilometres (45 mi) from Trondheim Central Station and sits at an elevation of 85 metres (279 ft) above sea level.

Preceding station	Regional trains	Following station
Hegra towards Trondheim S	R71	Meråker towards Storlien
