= Floren Chapel =

Church in Trøndelag, Norway

- Floren kapell
- Flora Chapel (Flora kapell)
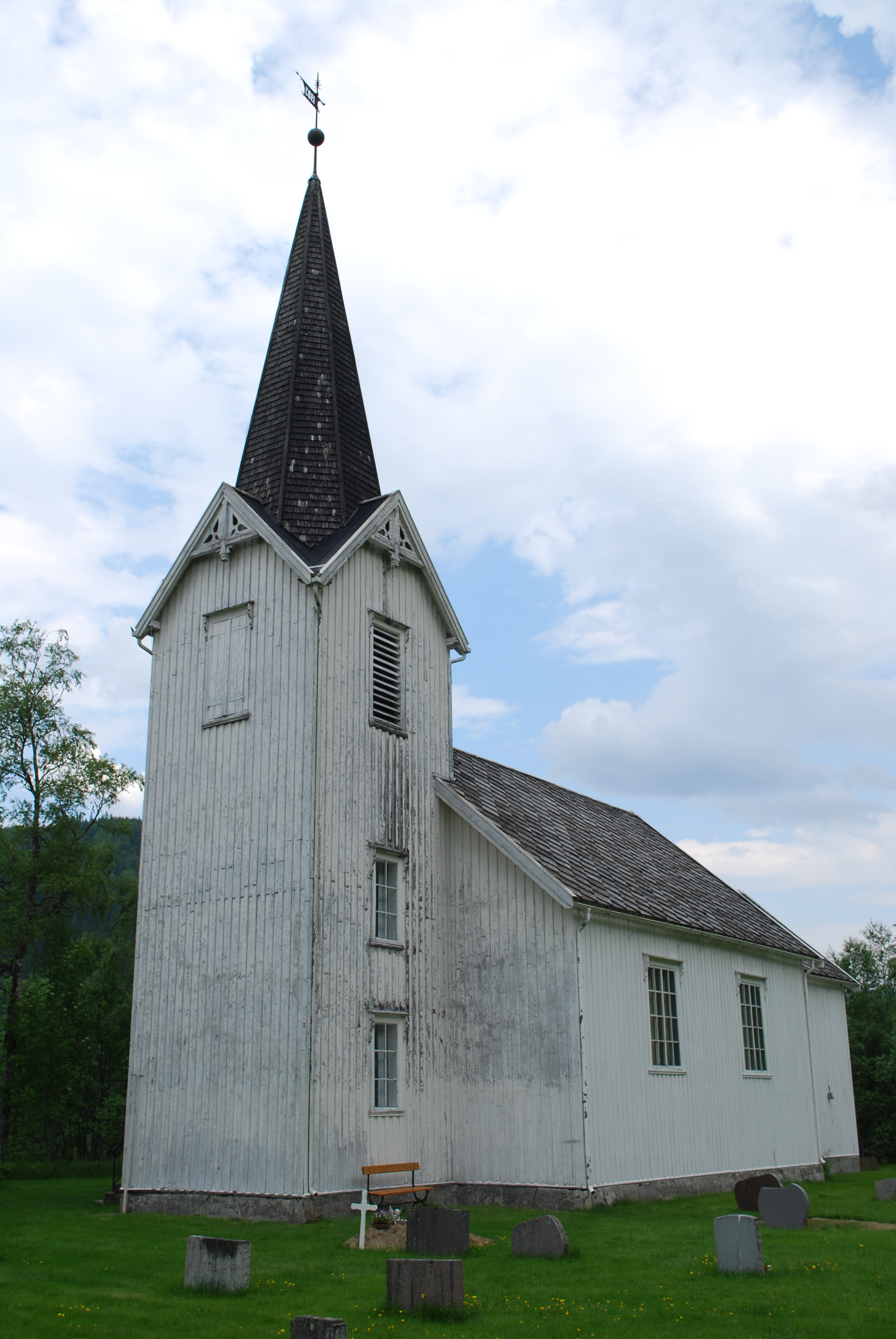
- View of the church
- Floren Chapel
- 63.457991938°N 11.35896608°E
- Location: Stjørdal Municipality, Trøndelag
- Country: Norway
- Denomination: Church of Norway
- Churchmanship: Evangelical Lutheran

History
- Status: Parish church
- Founded: 1902
- Consecrated: 1902

Architecture
- Functional status: Active
- Architect: Gunnar Øverkil
- Architectural type: Long church
- Completed: 1902 (124 years ago)

Specifications
- Capacity: 170
- Materials: Wood

Administration
- Diocese: Nidaros bispedømme
- Deanery: Stjørdal prosti
- Parish: Hegra
- Norwegian Cultural Heritage Site
- Type: Church
- Status: Not protected
- ID: 84163

Floren Chapel or Flora Chapel (Norwegian: Floren kapell or Flora kapell) is a parish church of the Church of Norway in Stjørdal Municipality in Trøndelag county, Norway. It is located in the village of Flornes. It is one of the churches for the Hegra parish which is part of the Stjørdal prosti (deanery) in the Diocese of Nidaros. The white, wooden church was built in a long church style in 1902 using plans drawn up by the architect Gunnar Øverkil. The church seats about 170 people.

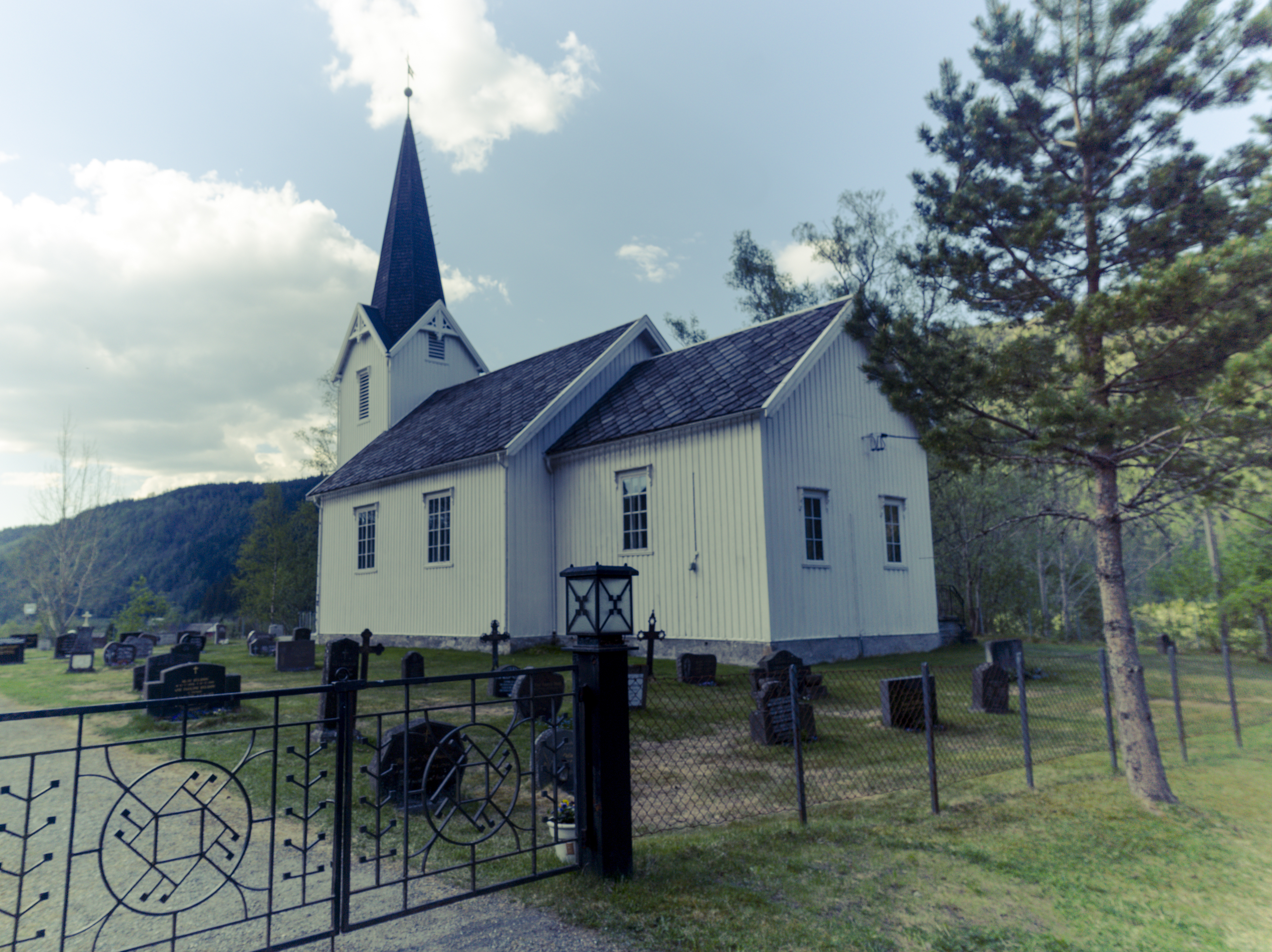
View of the chapel in 2013

== See also ==
- List of churches in Nidaros
