= Hegra, Norway =

Village in Stjørdal Municipality, Norway

Hegra
- Village
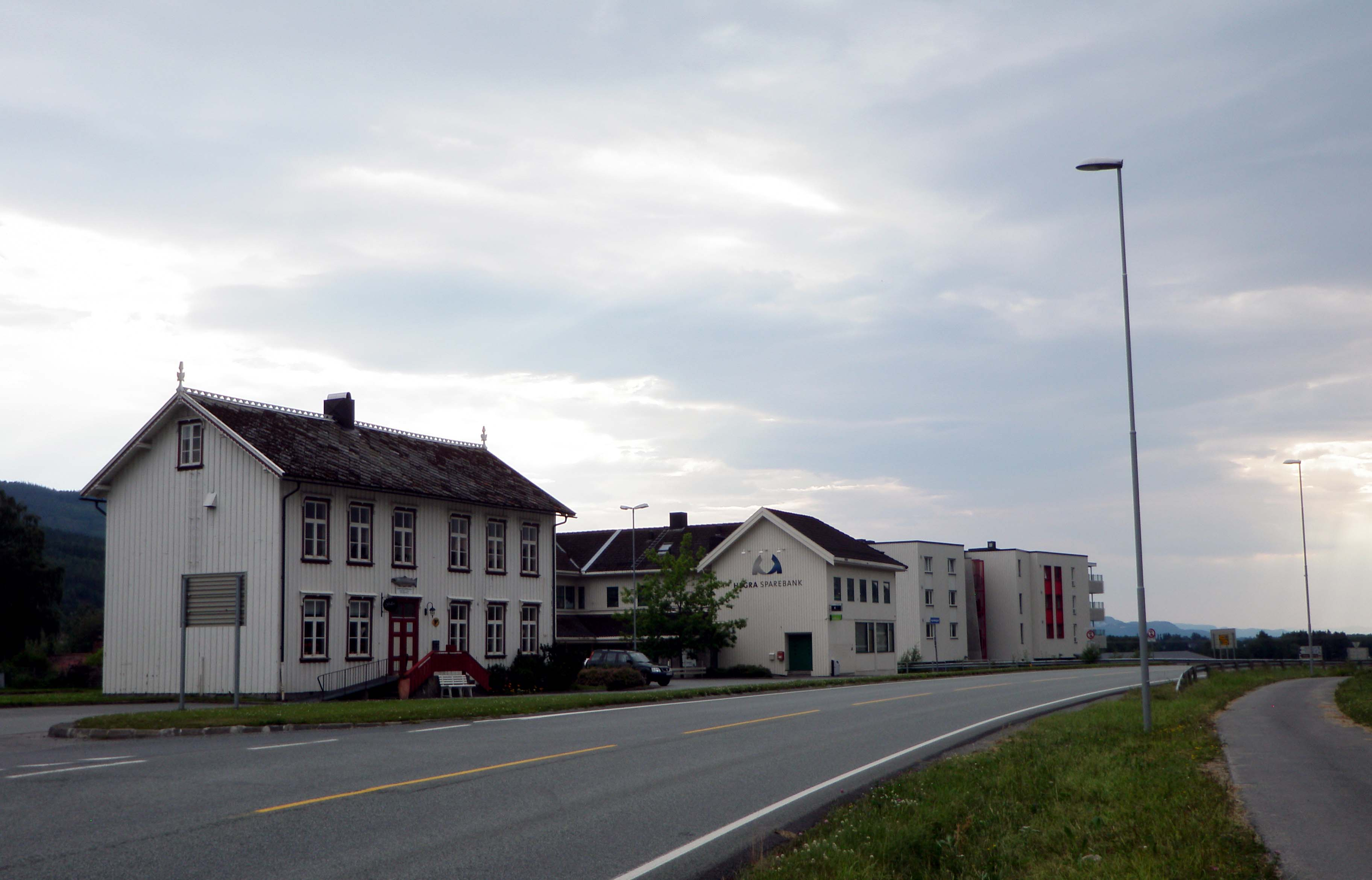
- View of the village
- Interactive map of Hegra
- Location within Trøndelag Location within Norway
- Coordinates: 63.4640°N 11.1140°E
- Country: Norway
- Region: Central Norway
- County: Trøndelag
- District: Stjørdalen
- Municipality: Stjørdal Municipality

Area
  - Total: 0.66 km^{2} (0.25 sq mi)
- Elevation: 19 m (62 ft)

Population (2024)
  - Total: 971
  - Density: 1,471/km^{2} (3,810/sq mi)
- Time zone: UTC+01:00 (CET)
  - Summer (DST): UTC+02:00 (CEST)
- Post Code: 7520 Hegra

Hegra is a village in Stjørdal Municipality in Trøndelag county, Norway. The village is located in the Stjørdalen valley, about 10 kilometres (6.2 mi) east of the town of Stjørdalshalsen along the Stjørdalselva river. The 0.66-square-kilometre (160-acre) village has a population (2024) of 971 and a population density of 1,471 inhabitants per square kilometre (3,810/sq mi).

The village is served by the unstaffed Hegra Station on the Meråker Line. The European route E14 highway also runs through the village, just south of Hegra Church. Hegra has its own grocery store, gas station, kindergarten, school and a local bank. Hegra is also one of the centers for the resurgence of the Dole Gudbrandsdal horse in Norway.

== History ==
The village was the administrative centre of the old Hegra Municipality which existed from 1874 until 1962.

The ancient rock carvings (Leirfald), as well as the small border fort Hegra Fortress (formerly known as Ingstadkleven Fort) are both located in Hegra. The fortress was the site of the Battle of Hegra Fortress where the invading German army fought from 10 April to 5 May 1940, not surrendering before all other Norwegian units in Southern Norway and Central Norway had capitulated.

== Media gallery ==
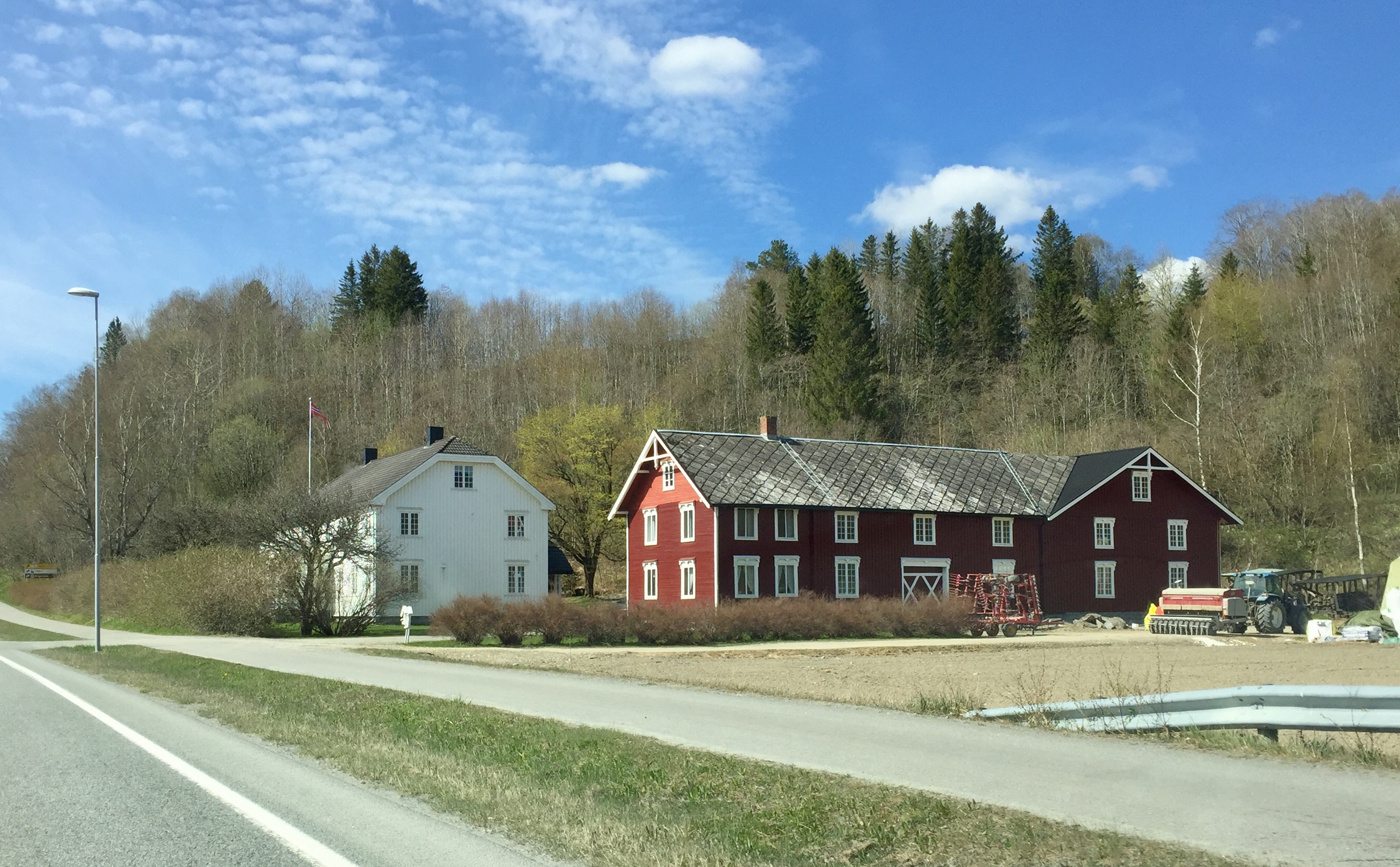
Buildings in Hegra

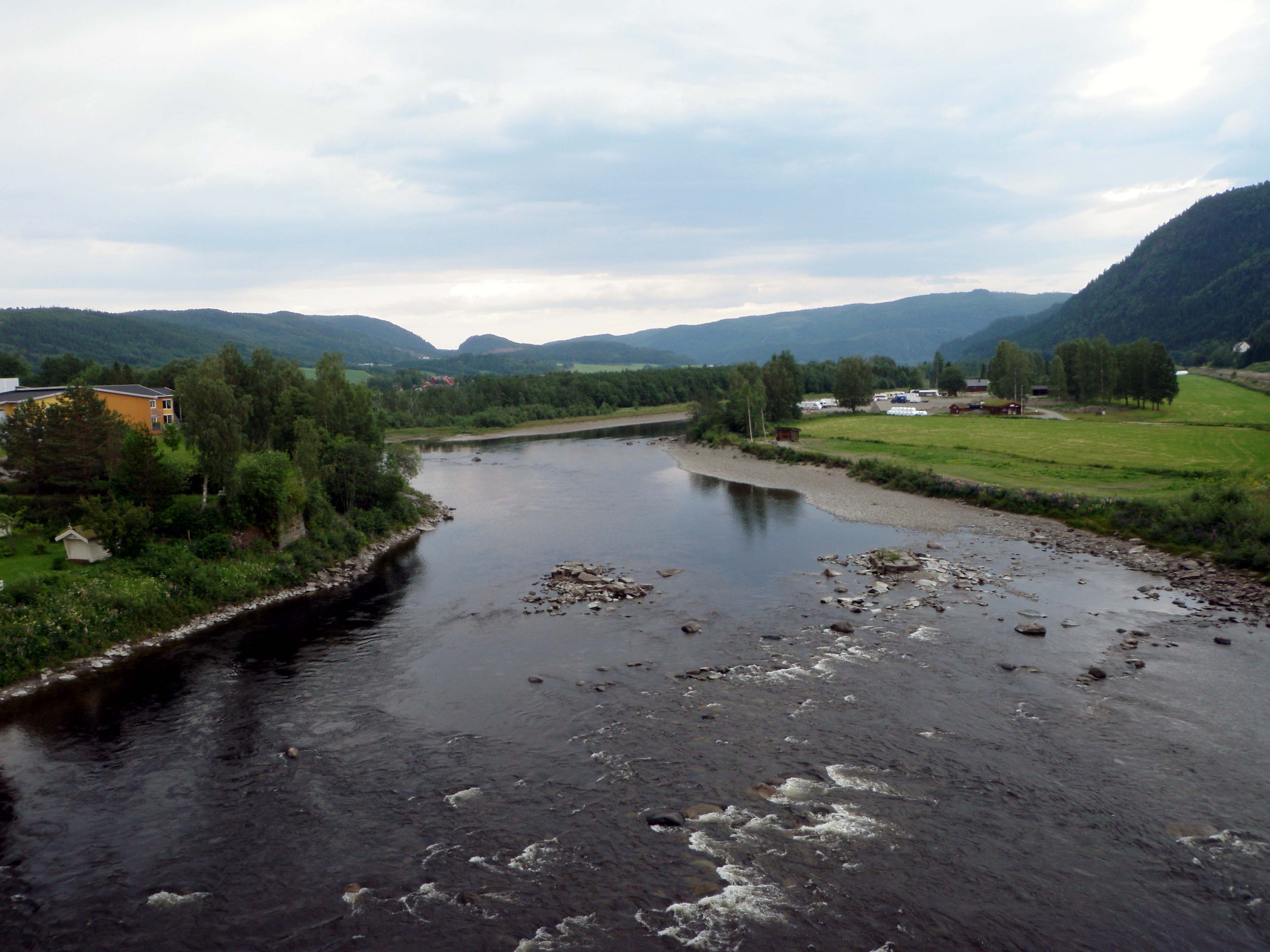
Stjørdalselva river in Hegra

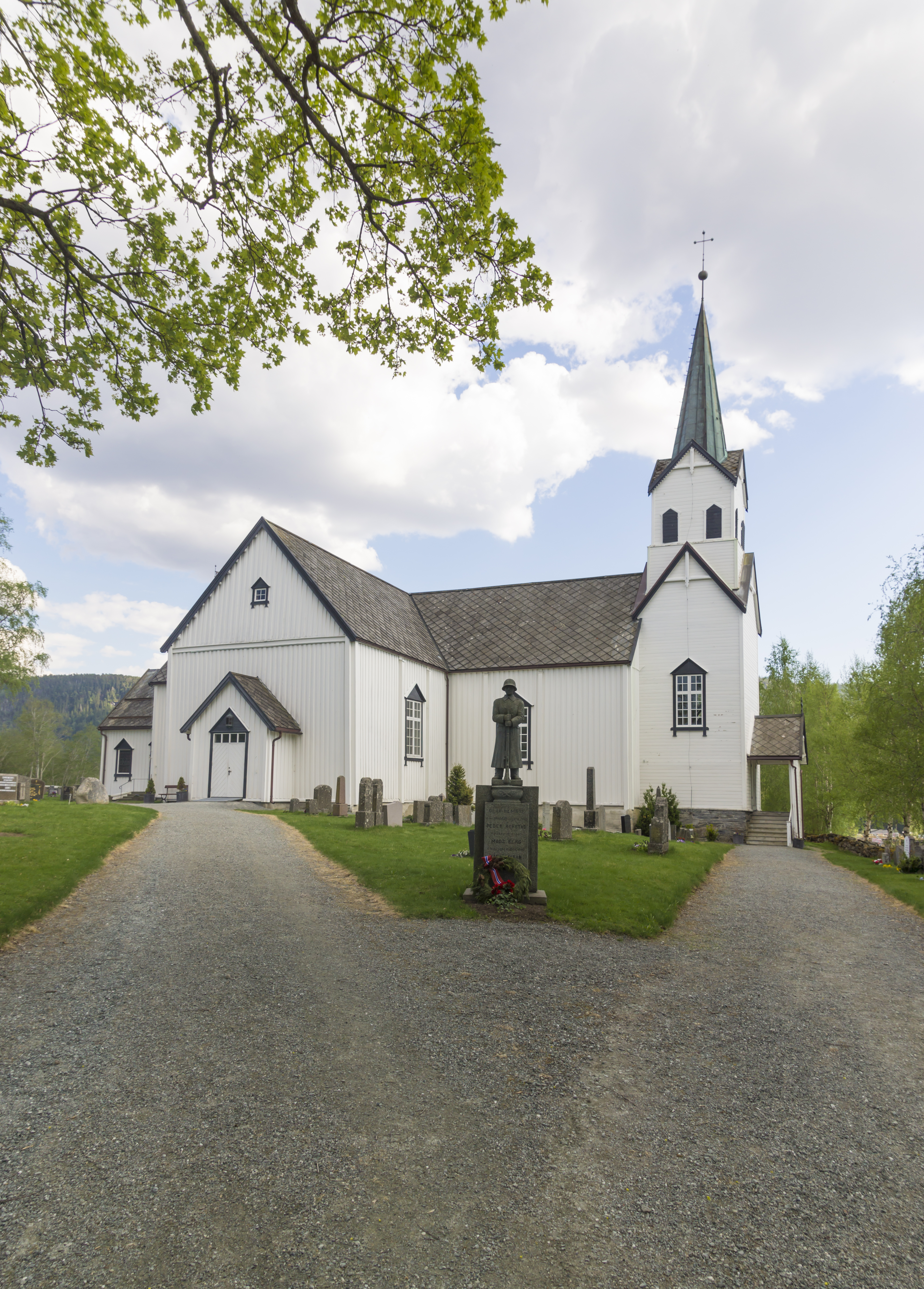
Hegra Church

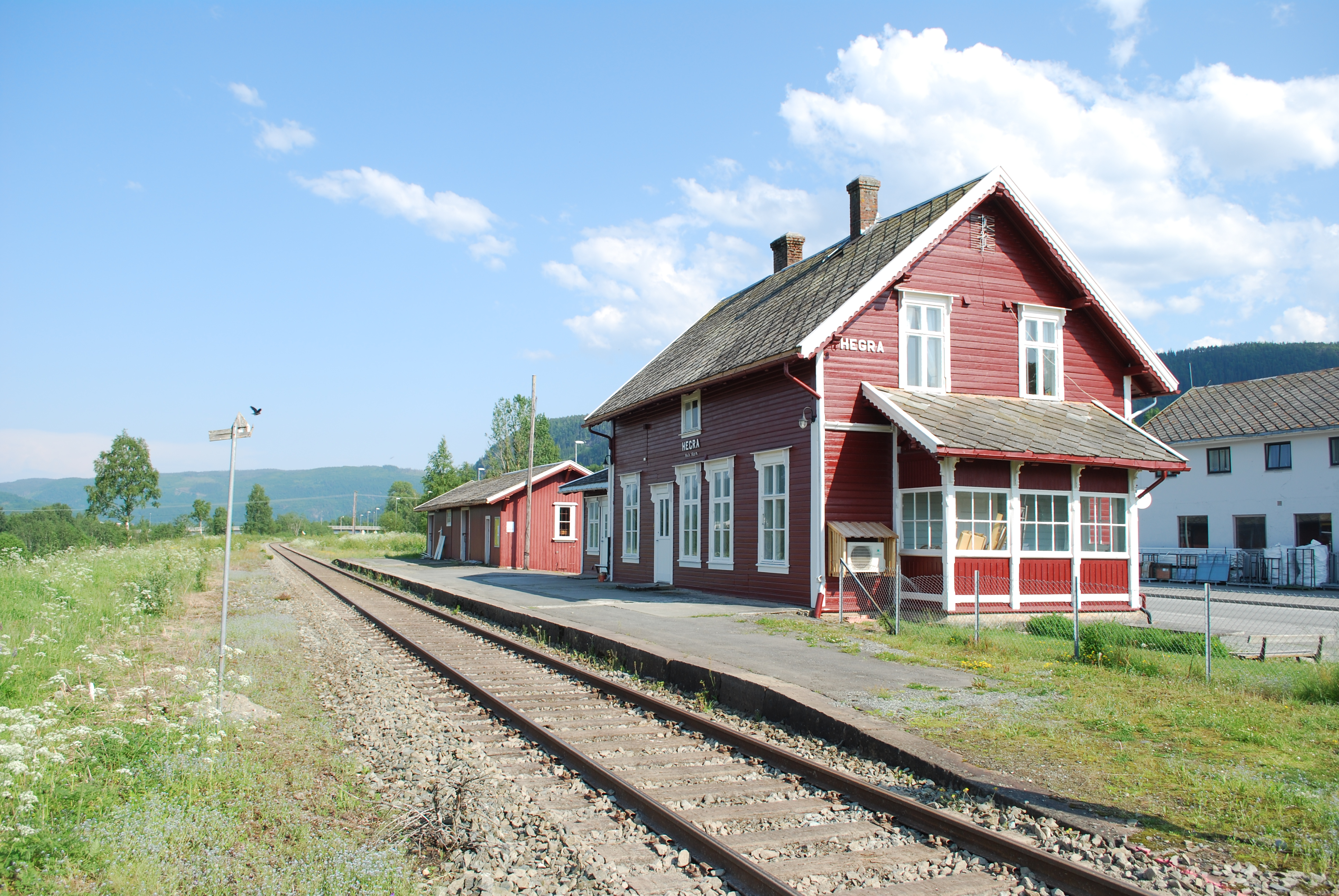
Hegra railway station

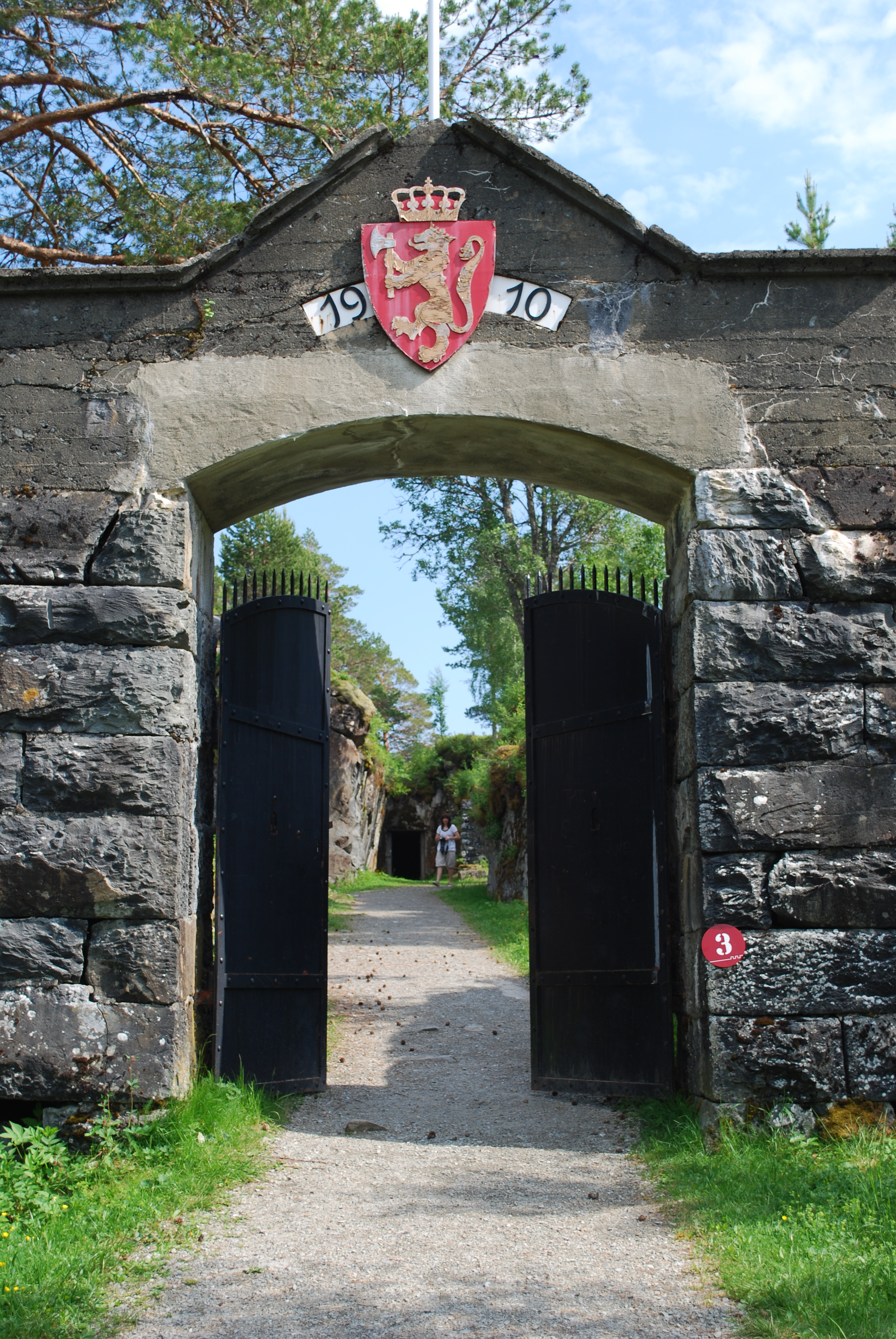
Hegra fortress

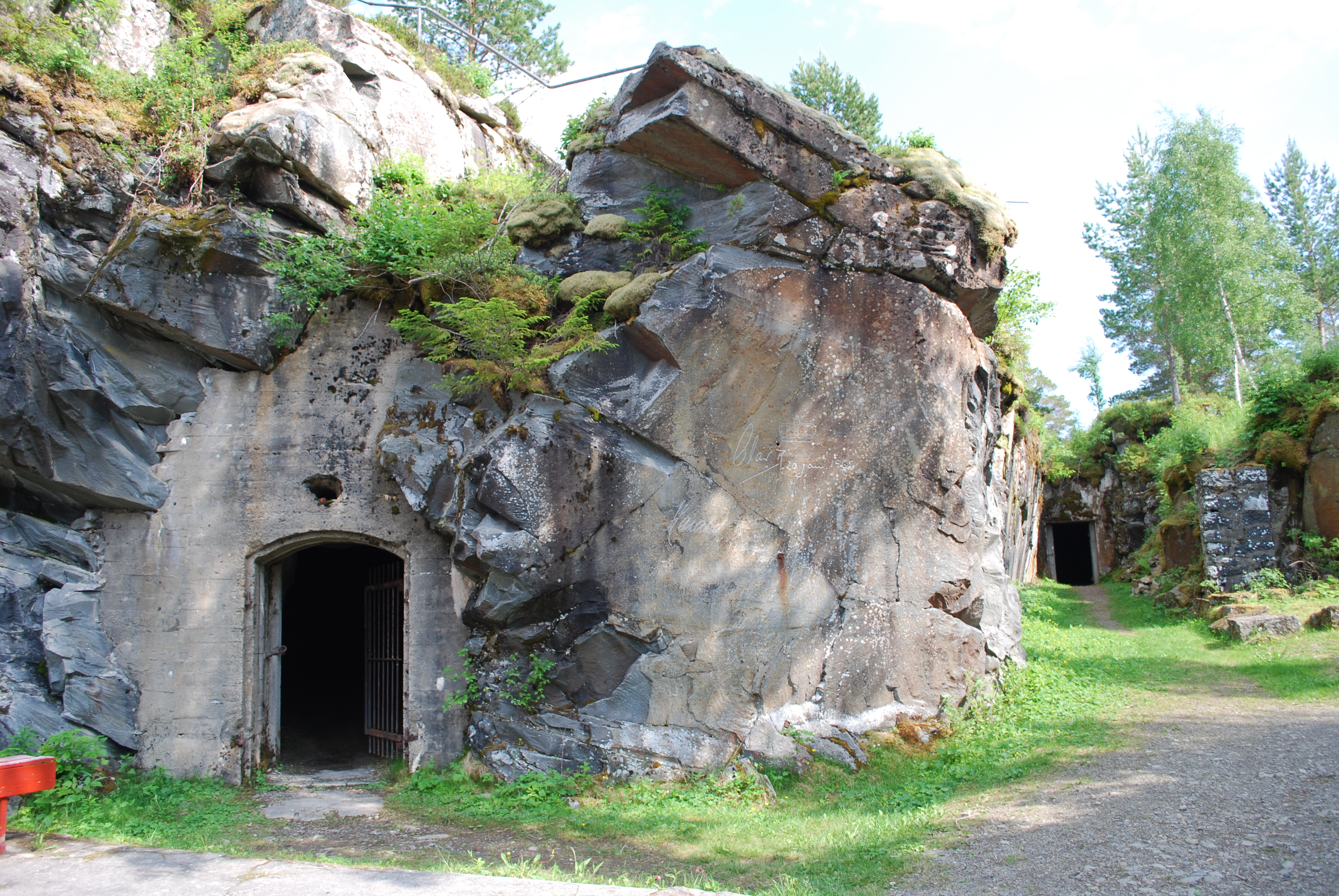
Hegra fortress

== Notable people ==
- Ida Basilier-Magelssen (1846–1928 in Hegra), an opera singer
- Andreas Fleischer (1878–1957), a bishop in the Church of Norway
- Johan Peter Trøite (1880–1977), a politician with the Venstre party
- Ludvik Buland (1893–1945), a trade unionist
- Jon Leirfall (1899–1998), a politician with the Senterpartiet
- Arnstein Øverkil (1937–2014), a police chief
- Heidrun Kringen, (Norwegian Wiki) (born 1941), an artist
- Gøril Kringen (born 1972), a soccer player
