= Stjørdalshalsen =

Town in Trøndelag, Norway

Stjørdalshalsen Stjørdal
- Town/City
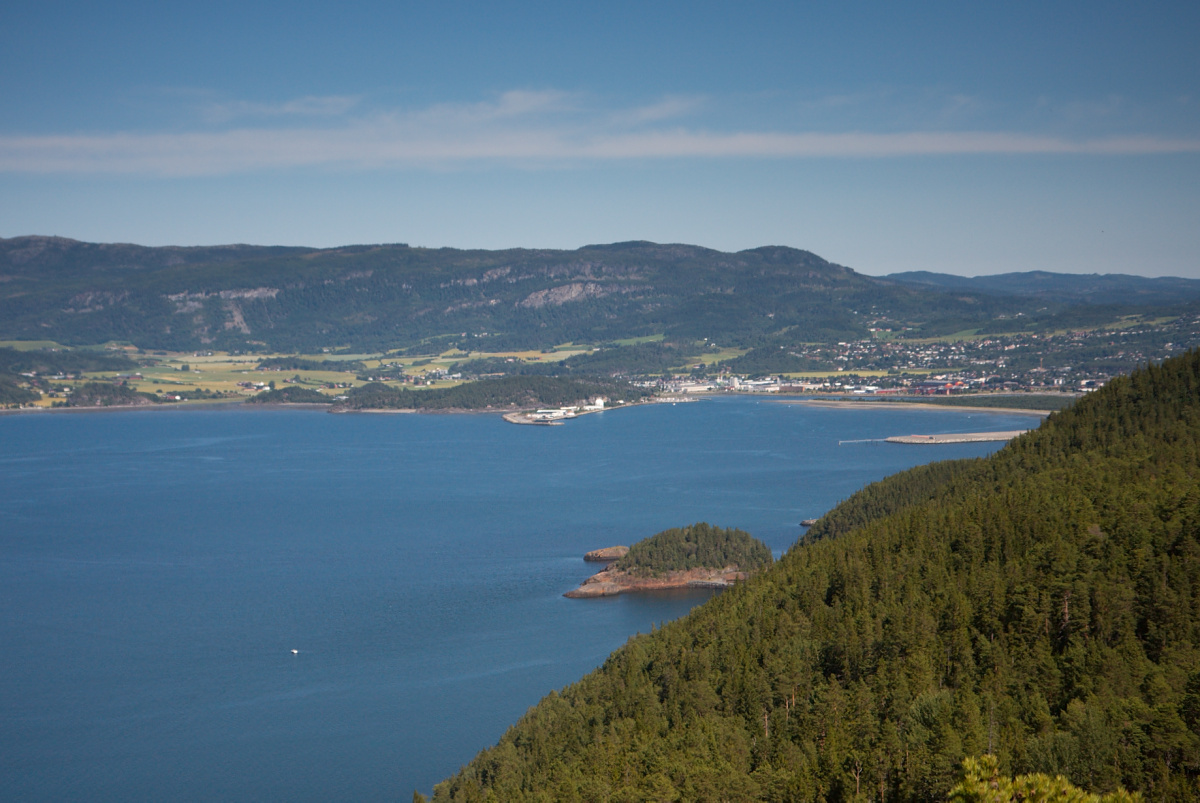
- View of the town
- Interactive map of Stjørdalshalsen; Stjørdal
- Location within Trøndelag Location within Norway
- Coordinates: 63.4712°N 10.9189°E
- Country: Norway
- Region: Central Norway
- County: Trøndelag
- District: Stjørdalen
- Municipality: Stjørdal Municipality
- Established as
- Town (By): 1997

Area
  - Total: 8.74 km^{2} (3.37 sq mi)
- Elevation: 9 m (30 ft)

Population (2024)
  - Total: 15,693
  - Density: 1,796/km^{2} (4,650/sq mi)
- Time zone: UTC+01:00 (CET)
  - Summer (DST): UTC+02:00 (CEST)
- Post Code: 7500 Stjørdal

Stjørdalshalsen or Stjørdal (nickname: Halsen) is a town and the administrative centre of Stjørdal Municipality in Trøndelag county, Norway. It is located between the rivers Stjørdalselva and Gråelva to the south and north and by the Trondheimsfjord to the west.

The 8.74-square-kilometre (2,160-acre) town has a population (2024) of 15,693 and a population density of 1,796 inhabitants per square kilometre (4,650/sq mi). Stjørdalshalsen was granted town status in 1997. The Nordland Line runs through the town, which is served by Stjørdal Station. The junction of the European route E14 and European route E6 highways is in Stjørdalshalsen, just north of Trondheim Airport, Værnes.

Stjørdalshalsen has quite a variety of industry including industries involving mineral products, glassware, plastics, and food production. There is also the offices of the operational management for the Heidrun field in the North Sea. The administrative offices for the Central Norway Regional Health Authority are also in the town. Ole Vig Upper Secondary School and some primary schools are also located in the town.

== Media gallery ==
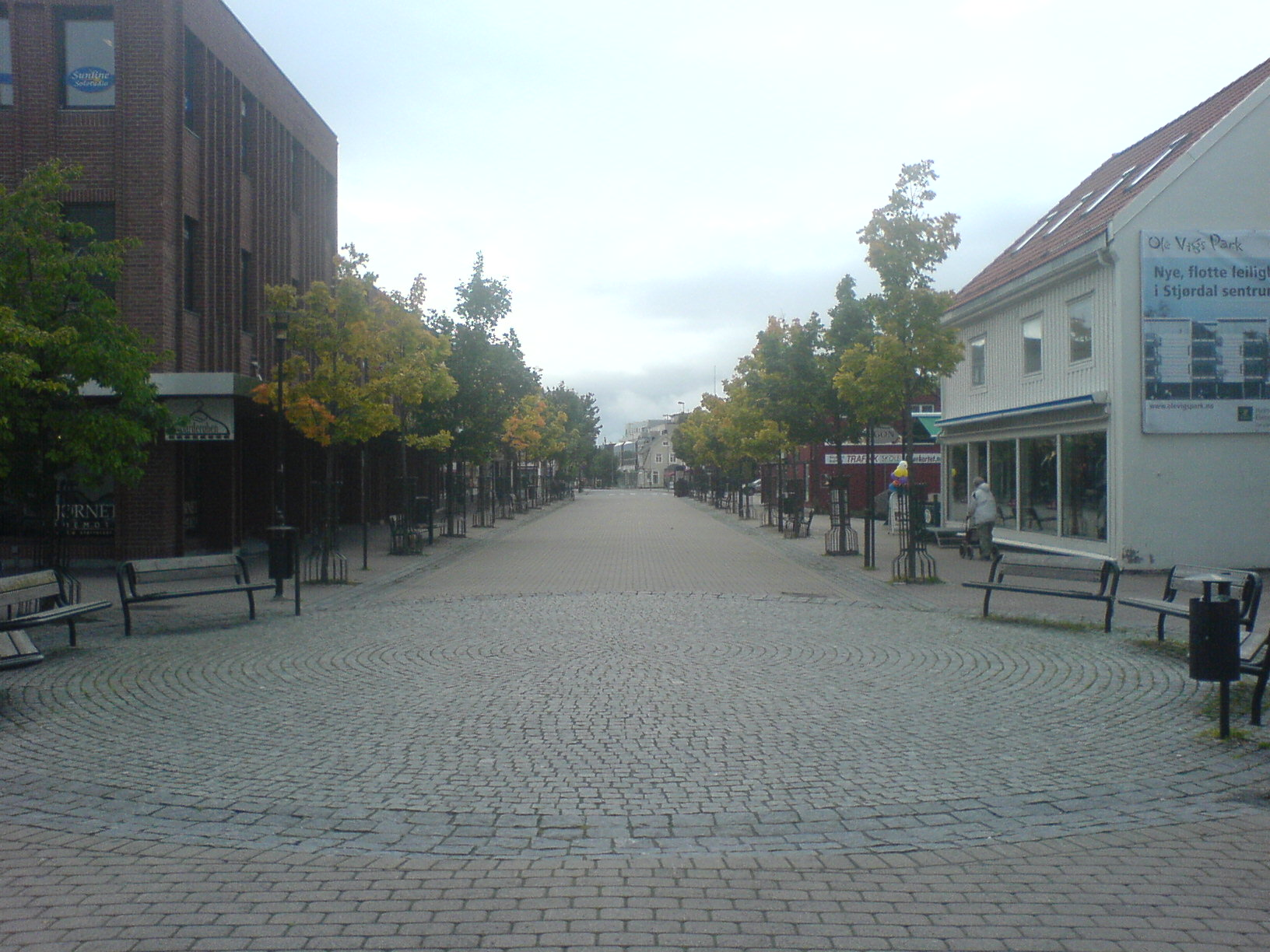
Kjøpmannsgata is the main shopping street in Stjørdalshalsen

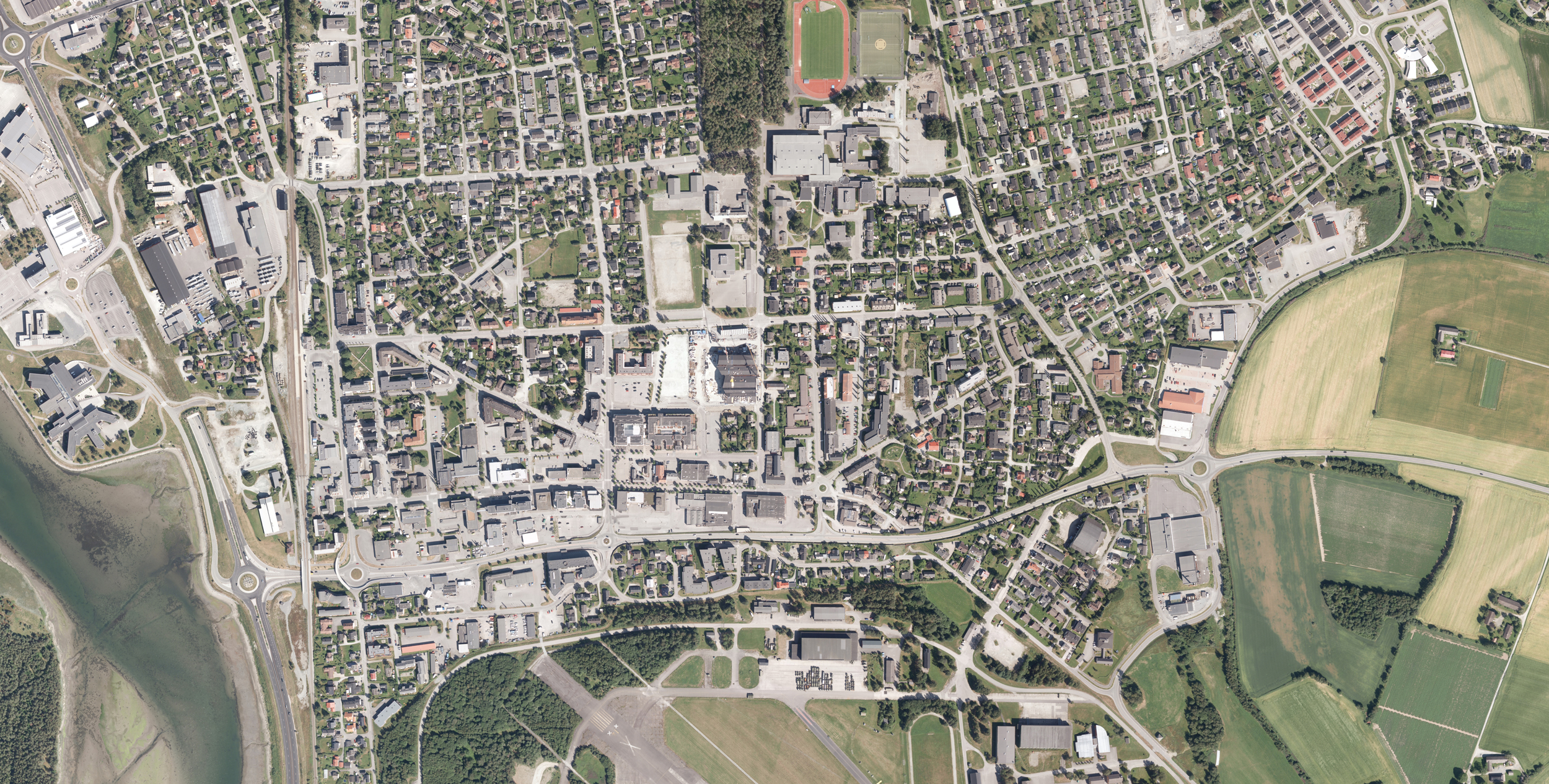
Aerial view of the town (2014)

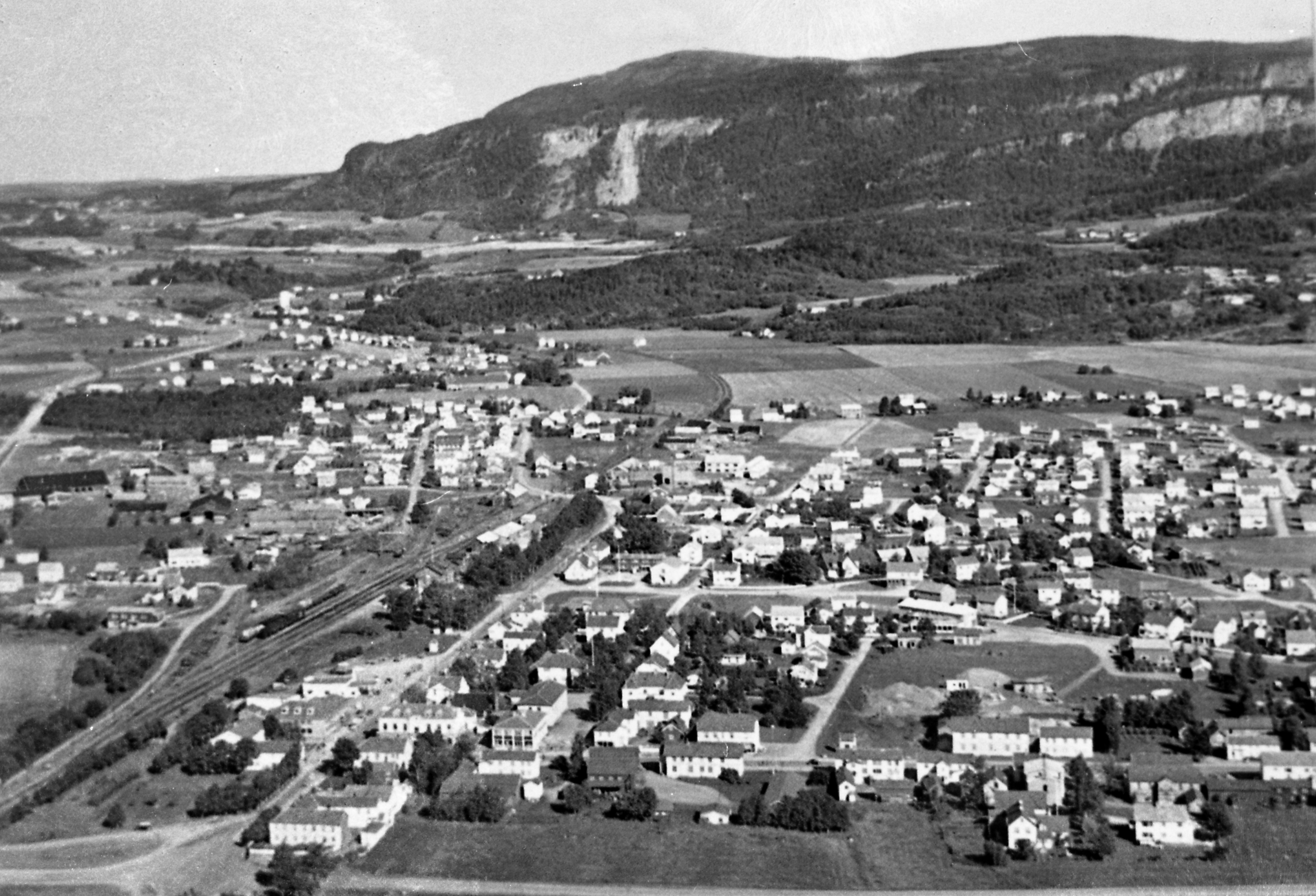
Aerial view of the town (1961)

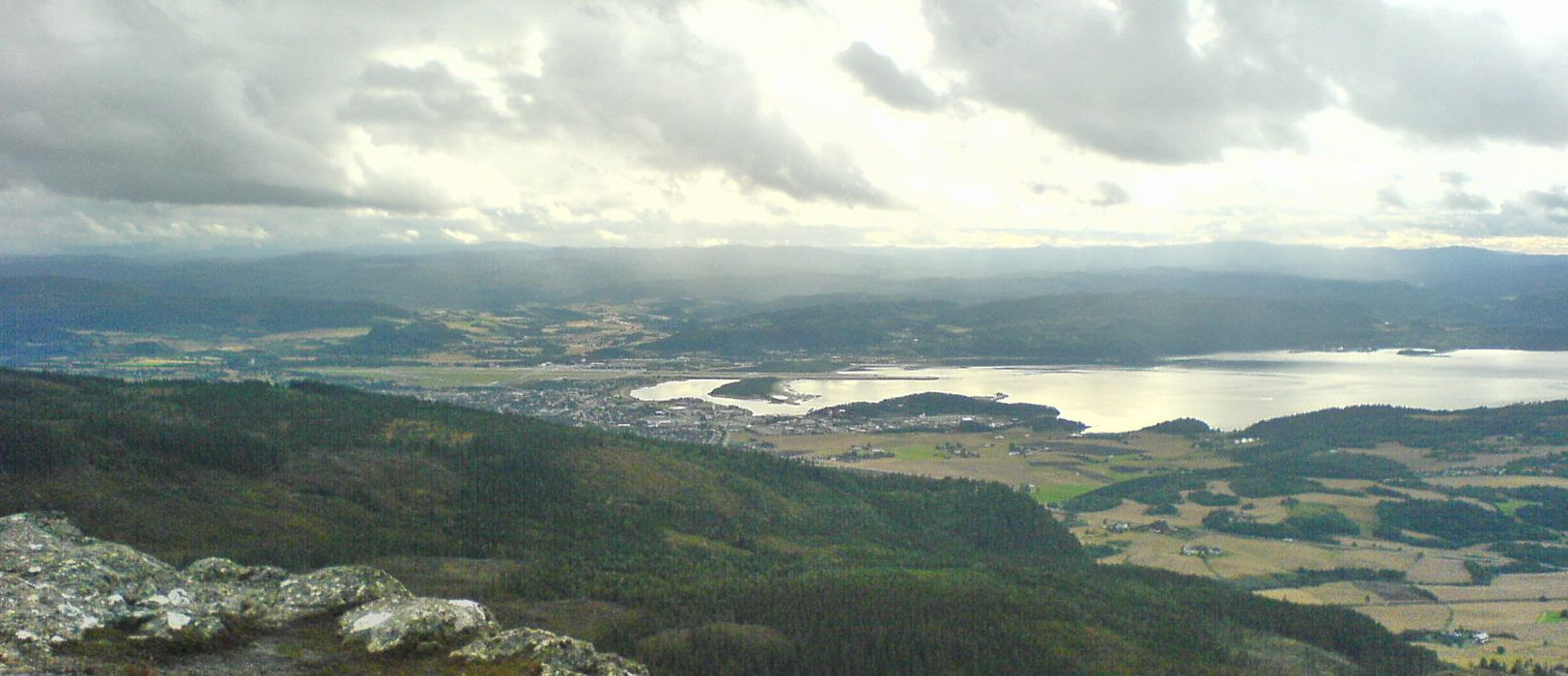
View of the fjord and town

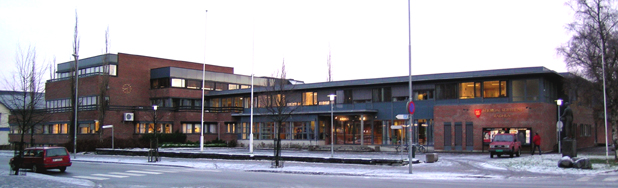
Town hall

== Climate ==
Climate data for Trondheim Airport Værnes 1991–2020 (12 m, extremes 1946–2025, sunhrs 2016–2024)
Month	Jan	Feb	Mar	Apr	May	Jun	Jul	Aug	Sep	Oct	Nov	Dec	Year
Record high °C (°F)	13.7 (56.7)	13.8 (56.8)	15.7 (60.3)	23.3 (73.9)	30 (86)	34.3 (93.7)	34.5 (94.1)	31.3 (88.3)	27.9 (82.2)	22.1 (71.8)	16.1 (61.0)	13.1 (55.6)	34.5 (94.1)
Mean daily maximum °C (°F)	1.9 (35.4)	2.0 (35.6)	4.6 (40.3)	9.3 (48.7)	13.8 (56.8)	17.1 (62.8)	19.8 (67.6)	19.1 (66.4)	15.0 (59.0)	9.3 (48.7)	4.7 (40.5)	2.3 (36.1)	9.9 (49.8)
Daily mean °C (°F)	−1 (30)	−1.1 (30.0)	1 (34)	5.1 (41.2)	9.2 (48.6)	12.6 (54.7)	15.2 (59.4)	14.6 (58.3)	11 (52)	5.8 (42.4)	1.7 (35.1)	−0.7 (30.7)	6.1 (43.0)
Mean daily minimum °C (°F)	−4.1 (24.6)	−4.1 (24.6)	−2.2 (28.0)	1.4 (34.5)	5.3 (41.5)	8.9 (48.0)	11.4 (52.5)	11.0 (51.8)	7.8 (46.0)	2.9 (37.2)	−1.1 (30.0)	−3.9 (25.0)	2.8 (37.0)
Record low °C (°F)	−25.6 (−14.1)	−25.5 (−13.9)	−23.0 (−9.4)	−13.9 (7.0)	−4.7 (23.5)	−0.2 (31.6)	2.3 (36.1)	−0.3 (31.5)	−4.9 (23.2)	−10.8 (12.6)	−19.0 (−2.2)	−23.5 (−10.3)	−25.6 (−14.1)
Average precipitation mm (inches)	64.6 (2.54)	63.9 (2.52)	61.3 (2.41)	42.1 (1.66)	52.7 (2.07)	76.1 (3.00)	74.4 (2.93)	82.8 (3.26)	88.9 (3.50)	77 (3.0)	64.4 (2.54)	75 (3.0)	823.2 (32.43)
Average precipitation days (≥ 1.0 mm)	13	13	13	10	11	13	12	13	13	13	11	14	149
Mean monthly sunshine hours	35.2	70.9	133.3	206.0	249.7	234.4	213.5	168.1	132.7	97.6	49.1	22.1	1,612.6
Source 1: Seklima
Source 2: NOAA-WMO averages 91-2020 Norway
