= Hegra Church =

Church in Trøndelag, Norway

- Hegra kirke
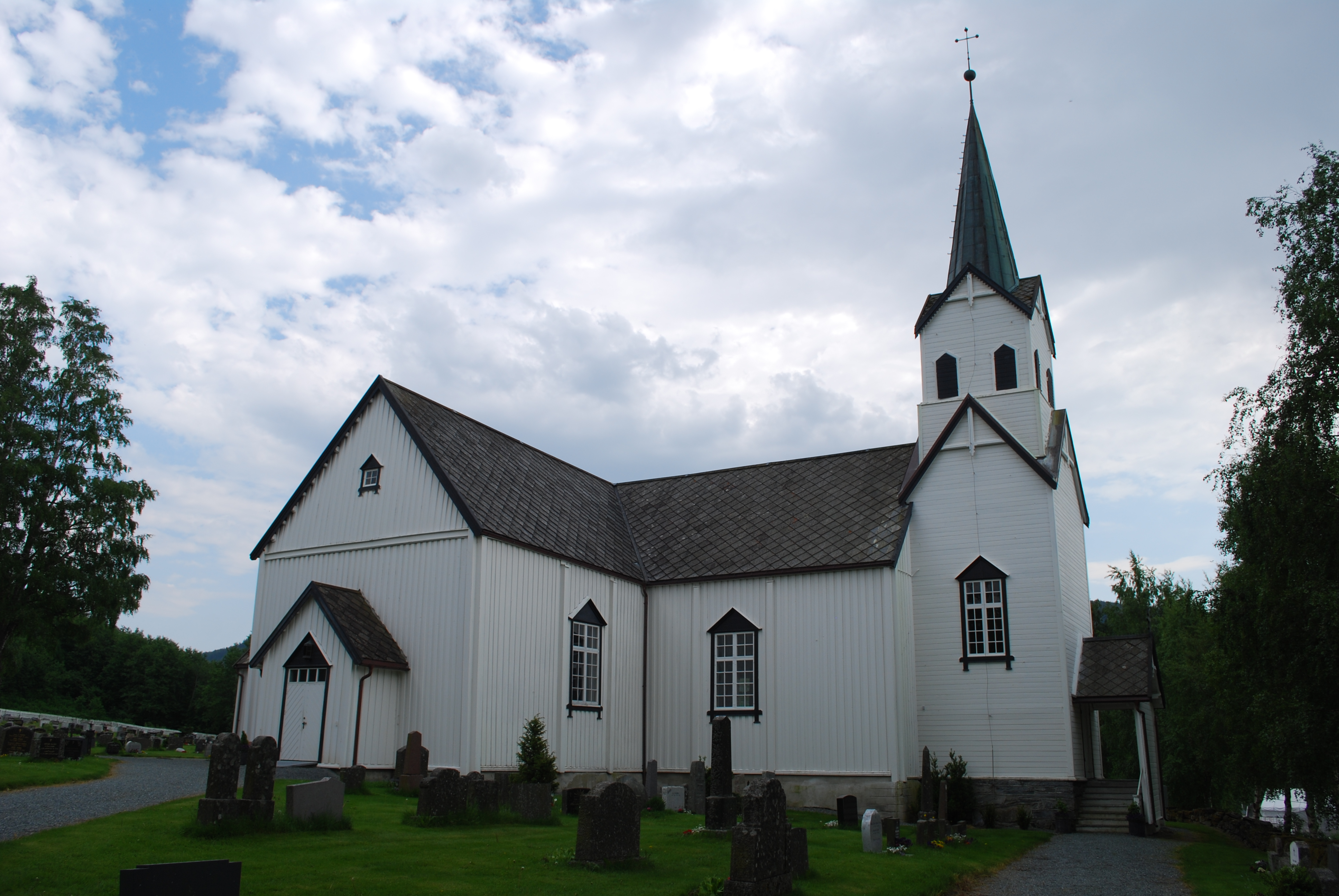
- View of the church
- Hegra Church
- 63.465502059°N 11.113700598°E
- Location: Stjørdal Municipality, Trøndelag
- Country: Norway
- Denomination: Church of Norway
- Churchmanship: Evangelical Lutheran

History
- Status: Parish church
- Founded: 14th century
- Consecrated: 1783

Architecture
- Functional status: Active
- Architect(s): Erich Must and J. Støren
- Architectural type: Cruciform
- Completed: 1783 (243 years ago)

Specifications
- Capacity: 400
- Materials: Wood

Administration
- Diocese: Nidaros bispedømme
- Deanery: Stjørdal prosti
- Parish: Hegra
- Norwegian Cultural Heritage Site
- Type: Church
- Status: Automatically protected
- ID: 84522

Hegra Church (Norwegian: Hegra kirke) is a parish church of the Church of Norway in Stjørdal Municipality in Trøndelag county, Norway. It is located in the village of Hegra. It is one of the churches for the Hegra parish which is part of the Stjørdal prosti (deanery) in the Diocese of Nidaros. The white, wooden church was built in a cruciform style in 1783 using plans drawn up by the architects Erich Must and J. Støren. The church seats about 400 people.

== History ==
The earliest existing historical records of the church date back to the year 1450, but the church was not new that year. The first church at Hegra was likely a stave church that was built about 20 metres (66 ft) north of the present church. The church was possibly built during the 1300s. The old medieval church was torn down around the year 1604 and a new church was built on the same site to replace it.

From 1705 to 1714, a new church was built right next to and south of the older church. The construction took a number of years. In 1714, the parish priest complained to the bishop about the fact that the snow which accumulated between the two buildings had created moisture and rot in the wood of the new church. After the new church was completed, the old church was torn down. The rot that had begun in the new church must have led to a short lifespan of the building because in 1783 the church was replaced again.

A new timber-framed long church was built about 15 metres (49 ft) south of the existing church. After the new church was completed, the older church was torn down. From 1875 to 1877, the church was expanded to the north and south by adding transepts so that after the addition, it had a cruciform ground plan.

== Media gallery ==
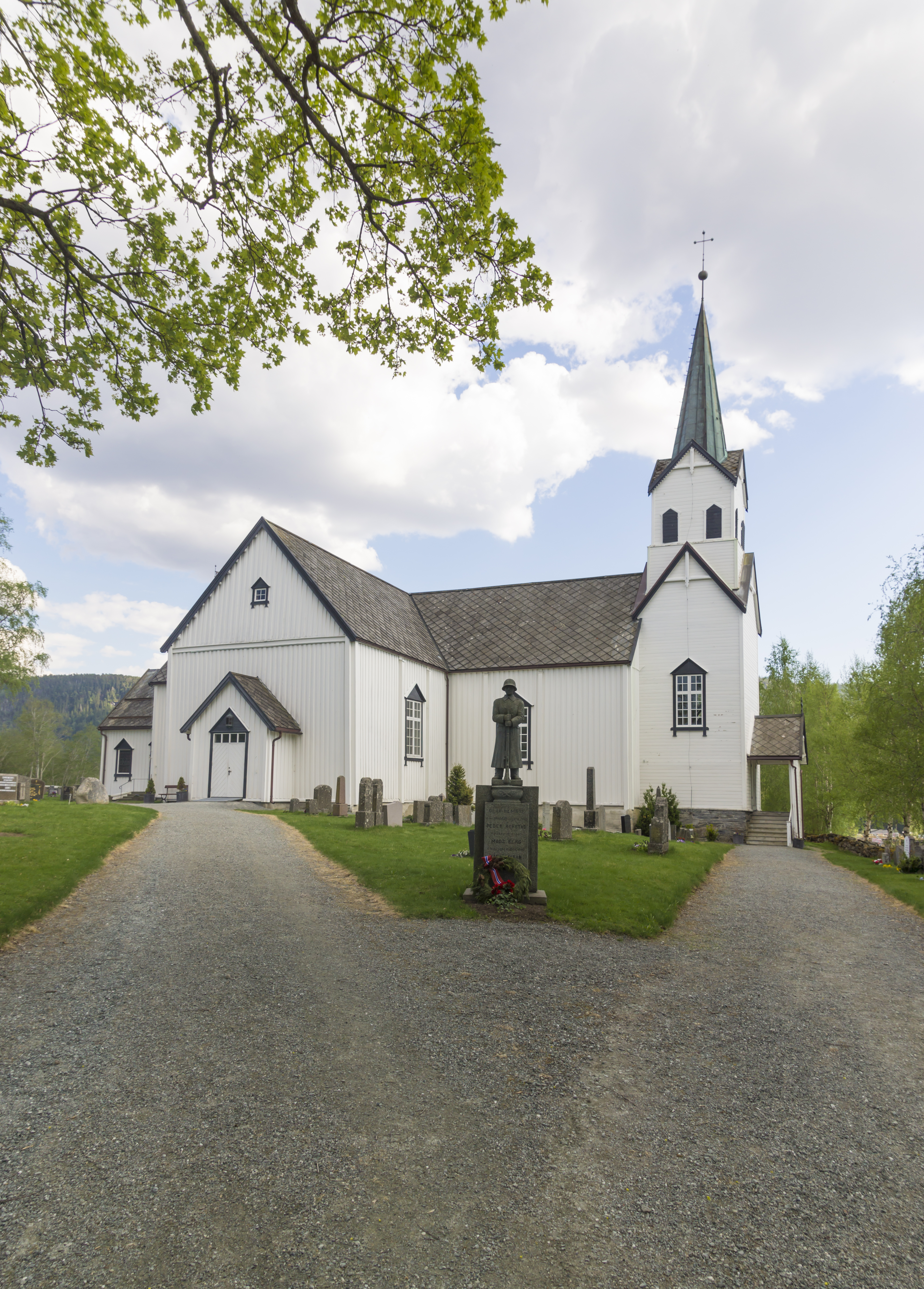

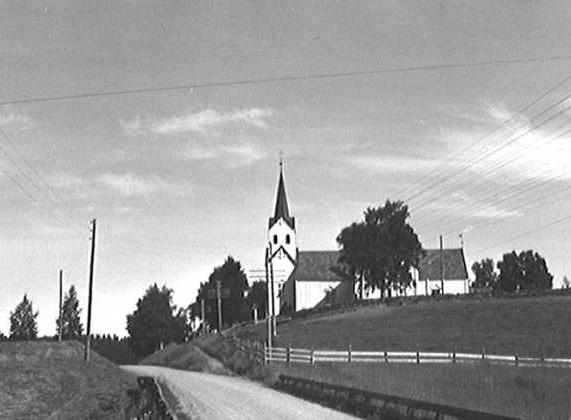

== See also ==
- List of churches in Nidaros
