= Stjørdalen =

District and valley in Trøndelag, Norway

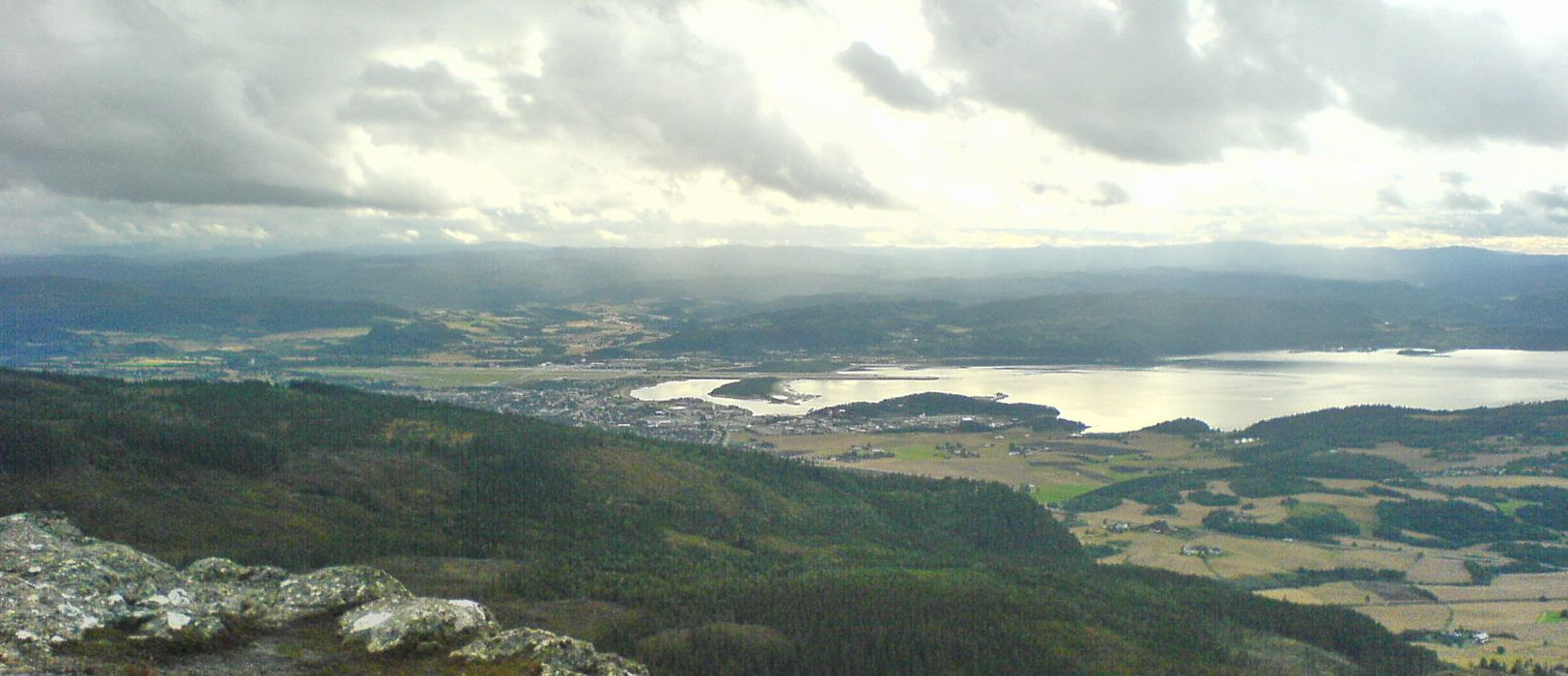
- Stjørdalen valley seen from Forbordsfjellet

- Location within Trøndelag Location within Norway
- Length: 75 kilometres (47 mi) East-West

Geology
- Type: River valley

Geography
- Location: Trøndelag, Norway
- Population centers: Stjørdalshalsen, Midtbygda
- Coordinates: 63.4372°N 11.3444°E
- Rivers: Stjørdalselva
- Interactive map of Stjørdalen

Stjørdalen is a valley and a traditional district in Trøndelag county, Norway. The valley follows the Stjørdalselva river from the Norway-Sweden border 75 kilometres (47 mi) to the west where it empties into the Trondheimsfjorden. The valley traverses Stjørdal Municipality and Meråker Municipality. The European route E14 highway and the Meråker Line railway follow the river through the length of the valley.

The traditional district of Stjørdalen is a historical region surrounding the Stjørdalen valley. The area is sometimes considered the southern part of the Inntrøndelag region. The neighboring Selbu Municipality and Tydal Municipality to the south are sometimes grouped together in this historic district. From the Iron Age through the Middle Ages, the area was referred to as Stiordølafylki, one of the small petty kingdoms in the Trøndelag region under the Frostating assembly.

== History ==
On 1 January 1838, the whole valley-district was established as Stjørdalen Municipality under the newly passed formannskapsdistrikt. In 1850, however, the large municipality was divided to create the two new municipalities: Øvre Stjørdalen Municipality and Nedre Stjørdalen Municipality. Later, in 1874, Øvre Stjørdalen Municipality was split into Hegra Municipality and Meråker Municipality. On 1 January 1901, Nedre Stjørdalen Municipality was divided into three municipalities of nearly equal sizes: Skatval Municipality, Stjørdal Municipality, and Lånke Municipality. At this point, there were now five municipalities in the valley. During the 1960s, there were many municipal mergers across Norway due to the work of the Schei Committee. On 1 January 1962, Hegra Municipality, Skatval Municipality, Stjørdal Municipality, and Lånke Municipality were merged to form the new Stjørdal Municipality.

On 1 June 1997, the village of Stjørdalshalsen in Stjørdal Municipality gained status as a town. Currently, the combined population of Stjørdal Municipality and Meråker Municipality is 21,738.
