= Stjørdalselva =

River in Trøndelag, Norway

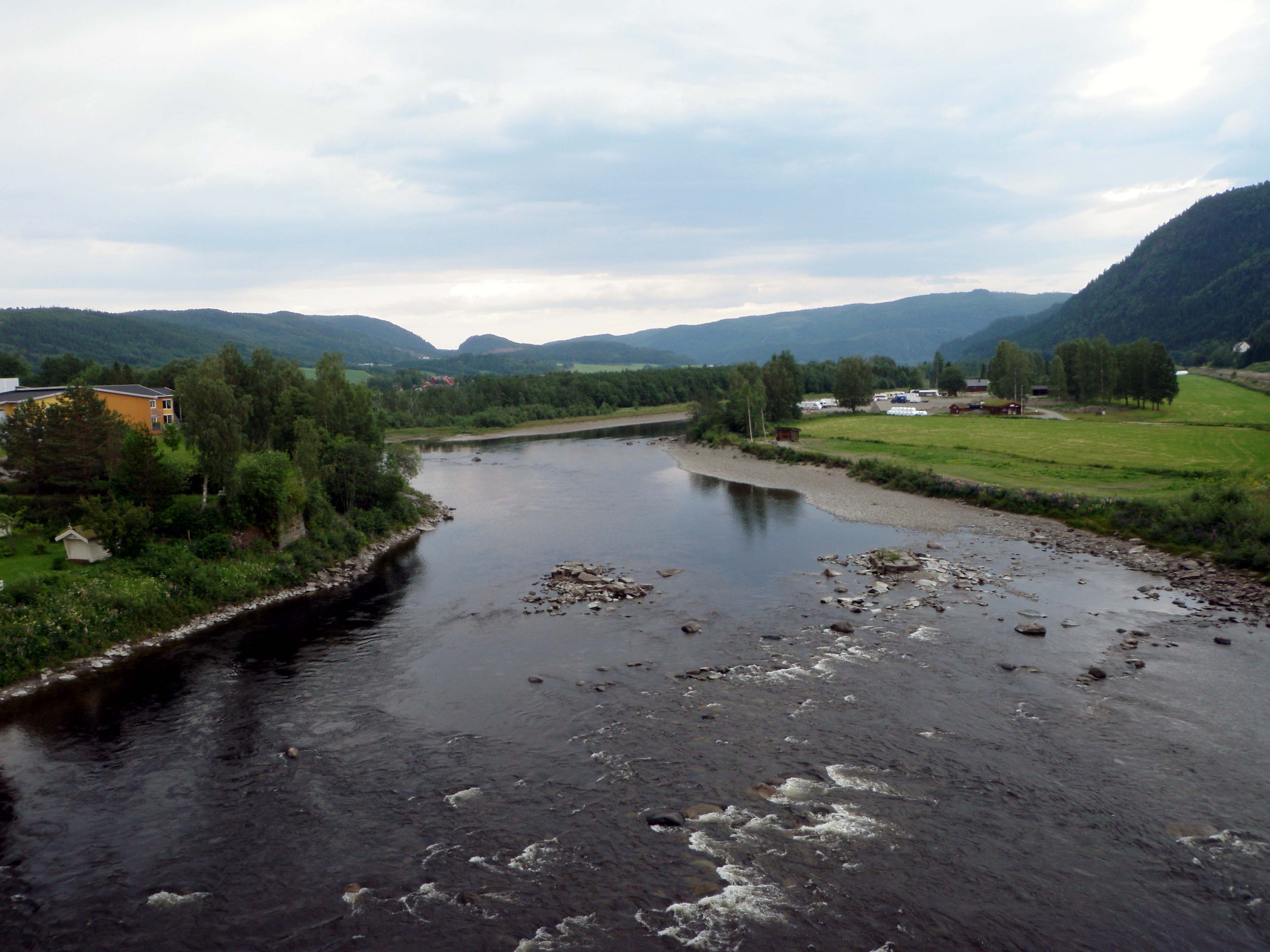
- View of the river at Hegra
- Interactive map of the river

Location
- Country: Norway
- County: Trøndelag
- Municipality: Meråker Municipality and Stjørdal Municipality

Physical characteristics
- Source: Confluence of the rivers Dalåa and Torsbjørka
  - location: Meråker Municipality, Trøndelag, Norway
  - coordinates: 63°24′24″N 11°44′38″E
  - elevation: 120 metres (390 ft)
- Mouth: Trondheimsfjord
  - location: Stjørdal Municipality, Trøndelag, Norway
  - coordinates: 63°26′50″N 10°54′24″E
  - elevation: 0 metres (0 ft)
- Length: 70 km (43 mi)
- Basin size: 2,111 km^{2} (815 sq mi)

Basin features
- Tributaries
  - left: Kåpperåa, Funna, Forra
  - right: Dalåa, Torsbjørka, Sona

Stjørdalselva (lit. 'Stjørdal River') is a 70-kilometre (43 mi) long river that reaches from near the Norwegian–Swedish border down the Stjørdalen valley through Meråker Municipality and Stjørdal Municipality before entering the Trondheimsfjord. The mouth is located on the south side of the town Stjørdalshalsen, just south of Trondheim Airport, Værnes. The village of Hell lies on the south side of the river's mouth. The mouth of the river was moved to allow the runway to expand into the delta.

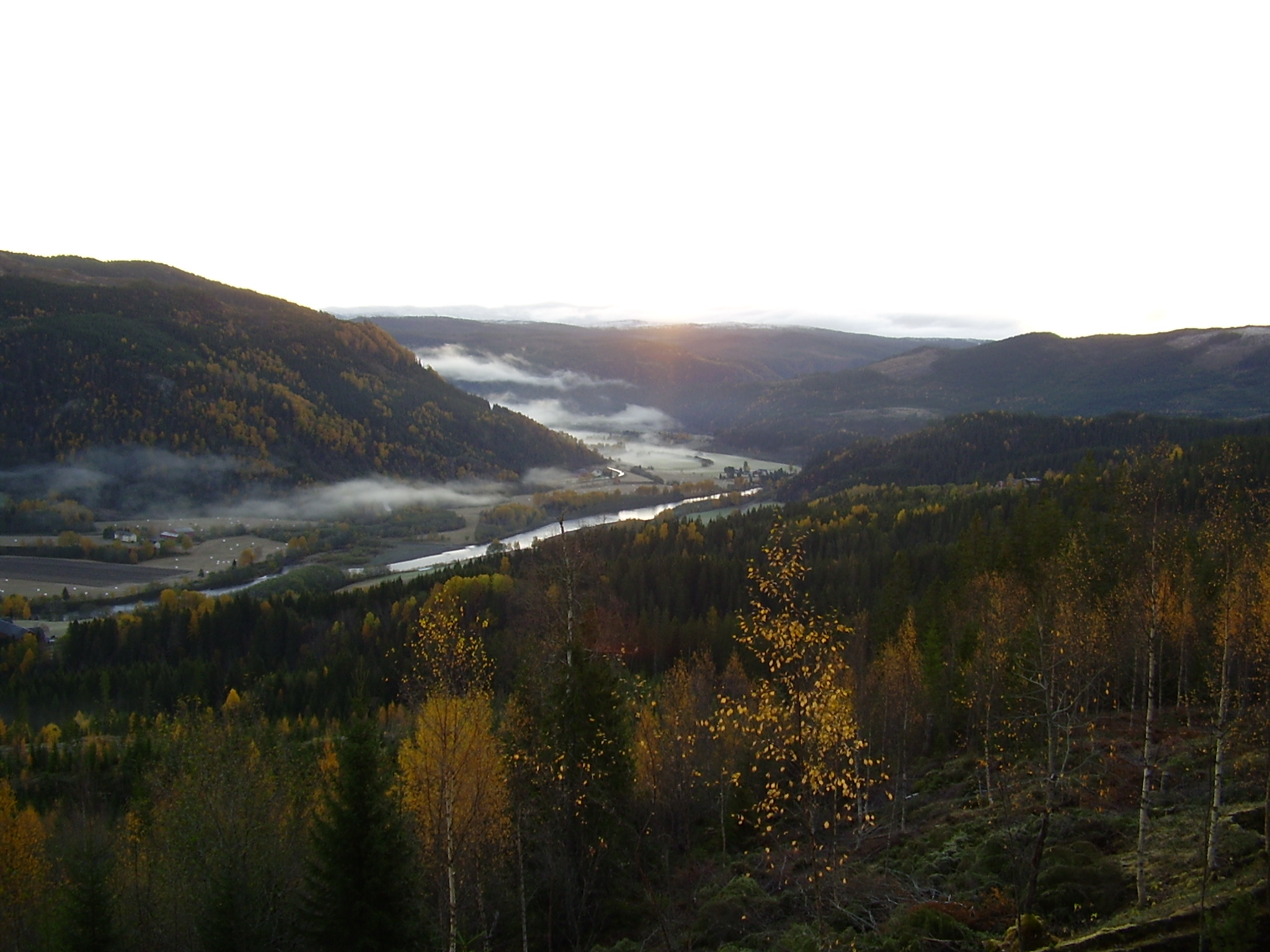
Stjørdalen valley with Stjørdalselva

The European route E14 highway and the Meråker Line railway follow the river from its source the entire length of the river.
