= Nedre Stjørdalen Municipality =

Former municipality in Norway

Nedre Stjørdalen Municipality Nedre Stjørdalen herred
- Former municipality
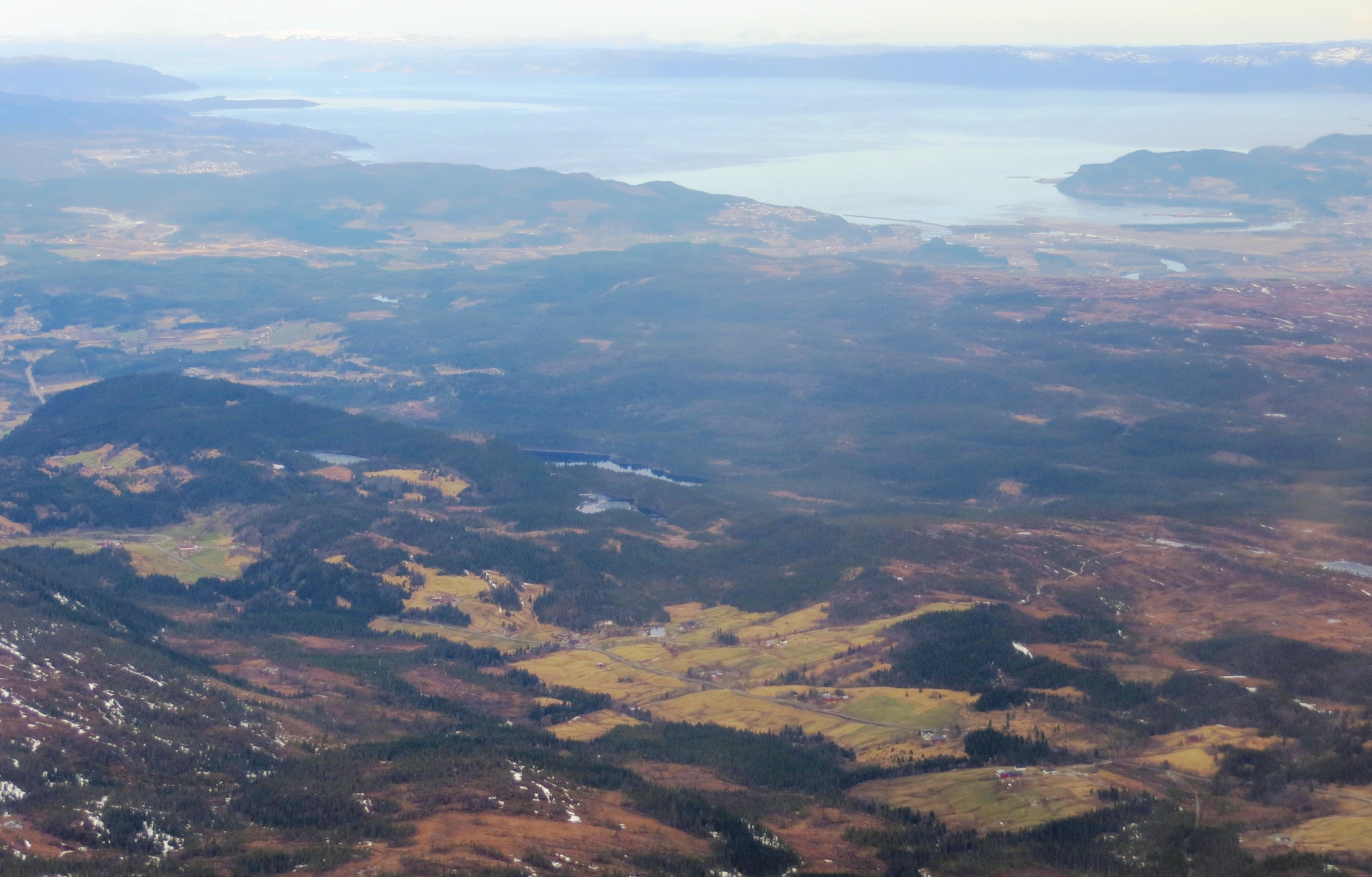

- Nord-Trøndelag within Norway

- Nedre Stjørdalen within Nord-Trøndelag
- Coordinates: 63°28′16″N 10°55′08″E
- Country: Norway
- County: Nord-Trøndelag
- District: Stjørdalen
- Established: 1850
  - Preceded by: Stjørdalen Municipality
- Disestablished: 1 Jan 1902
  - Succeeded by: Lånke Municipality, Skatval Municipality, and Stjørdal Municipality
- Administrative centre: Værnes

Government
  - Mayor (1892–1901): Bernhard Øverland (V)

Area (upon dissolution)
  - Total: 340 km^{2} (130 sq mi)
- Highest elevation: 606 m (1,988 ft)

Population (1902)
  - Total: 6,732
  - Density: 20/km^{2} (51/sq mi)
- Demonym: Stjørdaling
- Time zone: UTC+01:00 (CET)
  - Summer (DST): UTC+02:00 (CEST)
- ISO 3166 code: NO-1714

Nedre Stjørdalen is a former municipality in the old Nord-Trøndelag county in Norway. The municipality existed from 1850 until its dissolution in 1902. The 340-square-kilometre (130 sq mi) municipality covered the western part of what is now Stjørdal Municipality in Trøndelag county. The administrative centre was located at Værnes where Værnes Church is located.

== General information ==
The municipality was established in 1850 when the old Stjørdalen Municipality was divided into Øvre Stjørdalen Municipality (population: 5,100) and Nedre Stjørdalen Municipality (population: 6,543). On 1 January 1902, Nedre Stjørdalen Municipality was dissolved and it was divided into three new municipalities: Lånke Municipality (population: 1,449), Skatval Municipality (population: 2,125), and Stjørdal Municipality (population: 3,158).

=== Name ===
The municipality (originally the parish) is named after the Stjørdalen valley (Old Norse: Stjórardalr). The first element is the word Nedre which means "lower", referring to the fact that it is the lower part of the valley. The second element is the genitive case of the local river name Stjór (now called the Stjørdalselva river). The meaning of the river name is unknown. The last element is dalr which means "valley" or "dale".

=== Churches ===
The Church of Norway had one parish (sokn) within Nedre Stjørdalen Municipality. At the time of the municipal dissolution, it was part of the Nedre Stjørdal prestegjeld and the Søndre Innherred prosti (deanery) in the Diocese of Nidaros.

Churches in Nedre Stjørdalen Municipality
| Parish (sokn) | Church name | Location of the church | Year built |
|---|---|---|---|
| Lånke | Lånke Church | Hell | 1899 |
| Lånke | Elvran Chapel | Elvran | 1893 |
| Skatval | Skatval Church | Skatval | 1901 |
| Stjørdal | Værnes Church | Prestmoen | c. 1100 |

== Geography ==
The municipality was located along the shores of the Trondheimsfjorden in the lower parts of the Stjørdalen valley at the mouth of the river Stjørdalselva. Hegra Municipality was located to the east, Åsen Municipality was to the north, Malvik Municipality was to the west, and Selbu Municipality was to the south (both Malvik and Selbu were located in the neighboring Sør-Trøndelag county). The highest point in the municipality was the 606-metre (1,988 ft) tall mountain Klimpan.

== Government ==
While it existed, Nedre Stjørdalen Municipality was governed by a municipal council of directly elected representatives. The municipal council (Herredsstyre) of Nedre Stjørdalen was made up of representatives that were elected to four year terms. The mayor was indirectly elected by a vote of the municipal council. The municipality was under the jurisdiction of the Frostating Court of Appeal.

=== Mayors ===
The mayor (Norwegian: ordfører) of Nedre Stjørdalen Municipality was the political leader of the municipality and the chairperson of the municipal council. Here is a list of people who held this position:

- 1850–1853: Mathias Lund
- 1854–1857: Johan Ertzgaard
- 1858–1860: J.P. Holan
- 1860–1863: Johan Ertzgaard
- 1864–1867: Lars Soelberg
- 1868–1871: Bortinus Ydsti
- 1872–1875: Lars Soelberg (V)
- 1876–1883: John O. Arnstad (V)
- 1884–1889: Bernhard Øverland (V)
- 1890–1891: John O. Arnstad (V)
- 1892–1901: Bernhard Øverland (V)

== See also ==
- List of former municipalities of Norway
