= Skatval Municipality =

Former municipality in Trøndelag, Norway

Skatval Municipality Skatval herred
- Former municipality
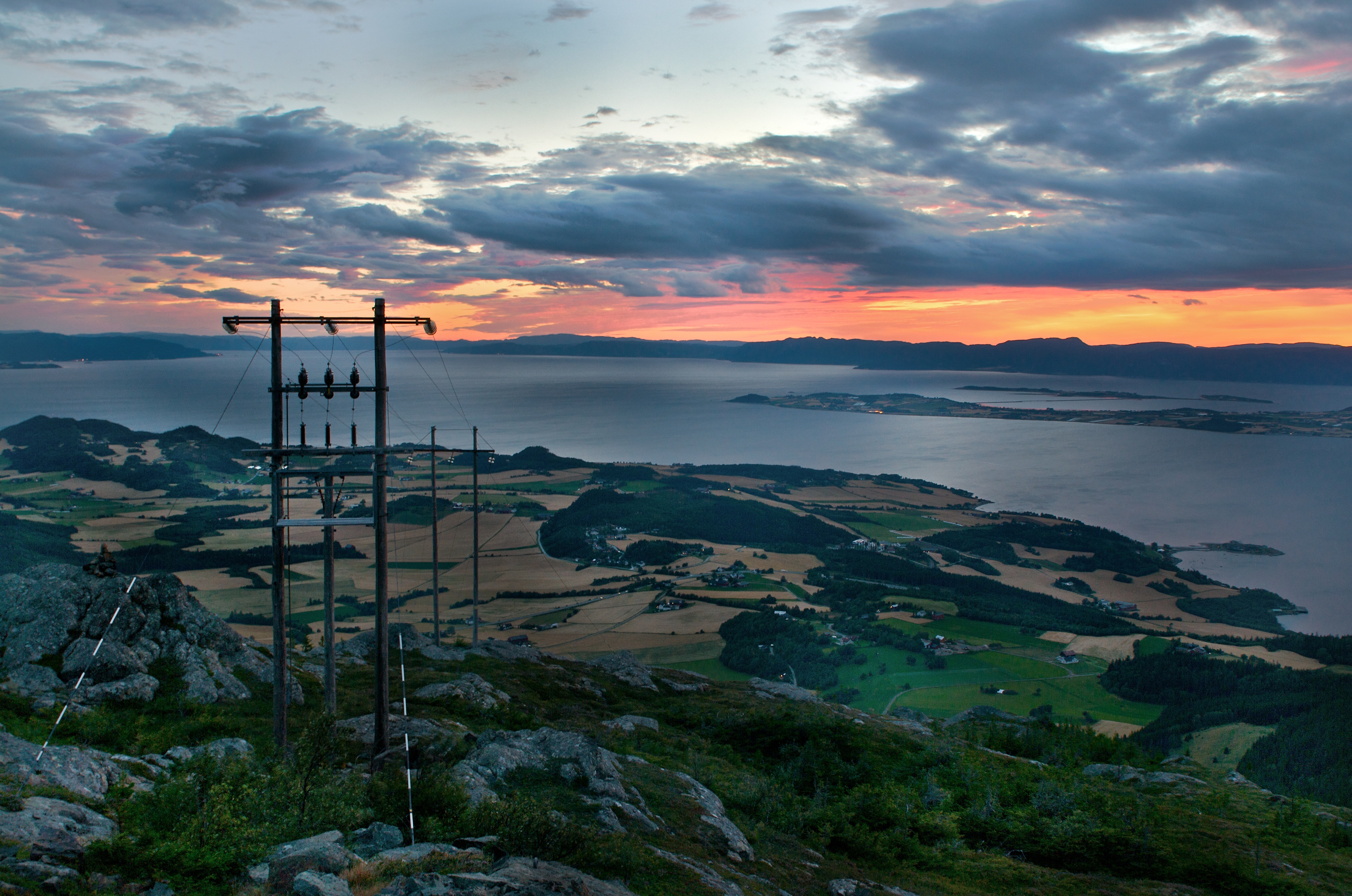
- View of the village of Skatval (front) and surrounding landscape as seen from Forbordsfjellet

- Nord-Trøndelag within Norway

- Skatval within Nord-Trøndelag
- Coordinates: 63°30′39″N 10°48′59″E
- Country: Norway
- County: Nord-Trøndelag
- District: Stjørdalen
- Established: 1 Jan 1902
  - Preceded by: Nedre Stjørdalen Municipality
- Disestablished: 1 Jan 1962
  - Succeeded by: Stjørdal Municipality
- Administrative centre: Skatval

Government
  - Mayor (1948–1961): Peder J. Arnstad (Sp)

Area (upon dissolution)
  - Total: 94.5 km^{2} (36.5 sq mi)
  - Rank: #544 in Norway
- Highest elevation: 590 m (1,940 ft)

Population (1961)
  - Total: 1,983
  - Rank: #454 in Norway
  - Density: 21/km^{2} (54/sq mi)
  - Change (10 years): ▼ −3.8%
- Demonym: Skatvalsbygg

Official language
  - Norwegian form: Neutral
- Time zone: UTC+01:00 (CET)
  - Summer (DST): UTC+02:00 (CEST)
- ISO 3166 code: NO-1715

Skatval is a former municipality in the old Nord-Trøndelag county, Norway. The 94-square-kilometre (36 sq mi) municipality existed from 1902 until its dissolution in 1962. The municipality encompassed the Skatval peninsula in the northwestern part of what is now Stjørdal Municipality in Trøndelag county. The administrative centre was the village of Skatval where the Skatval Church is located. Other villages in the Skatval area include Auran, Kvithammer, and Steinvika.

Prior to its dissolution in 1962, the 94.5-square-kilometre (36.5 sq mi) municipality was the 544th largest by area out of the 731 municipalities in Norway. Skatval Municipality was the 454th most populous municipality in Norway with a population of about 1,983. The municipality's population density was 21 inhabitants per square kilometre (54/sq mi) and its population had decreased by 3.8% over the previous 10-year period.

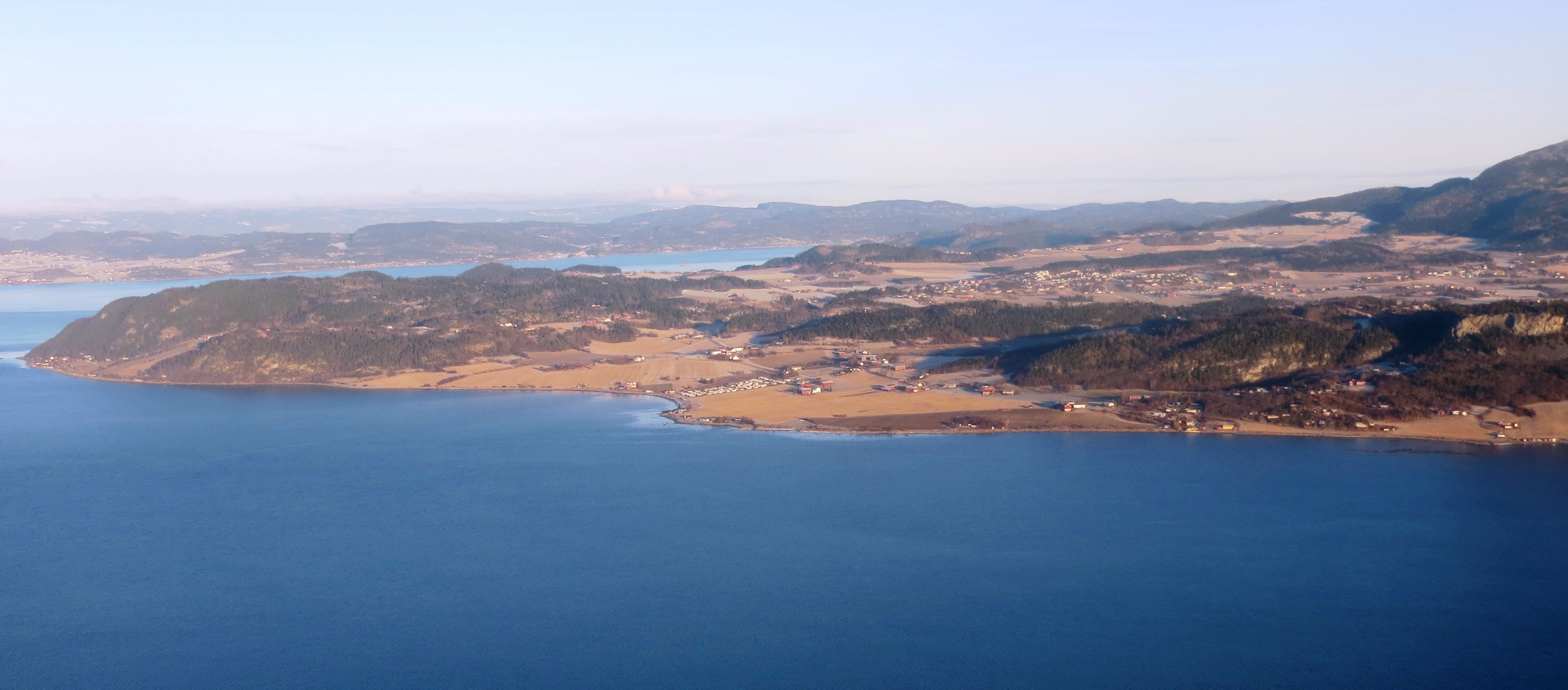
View of the Skatval area

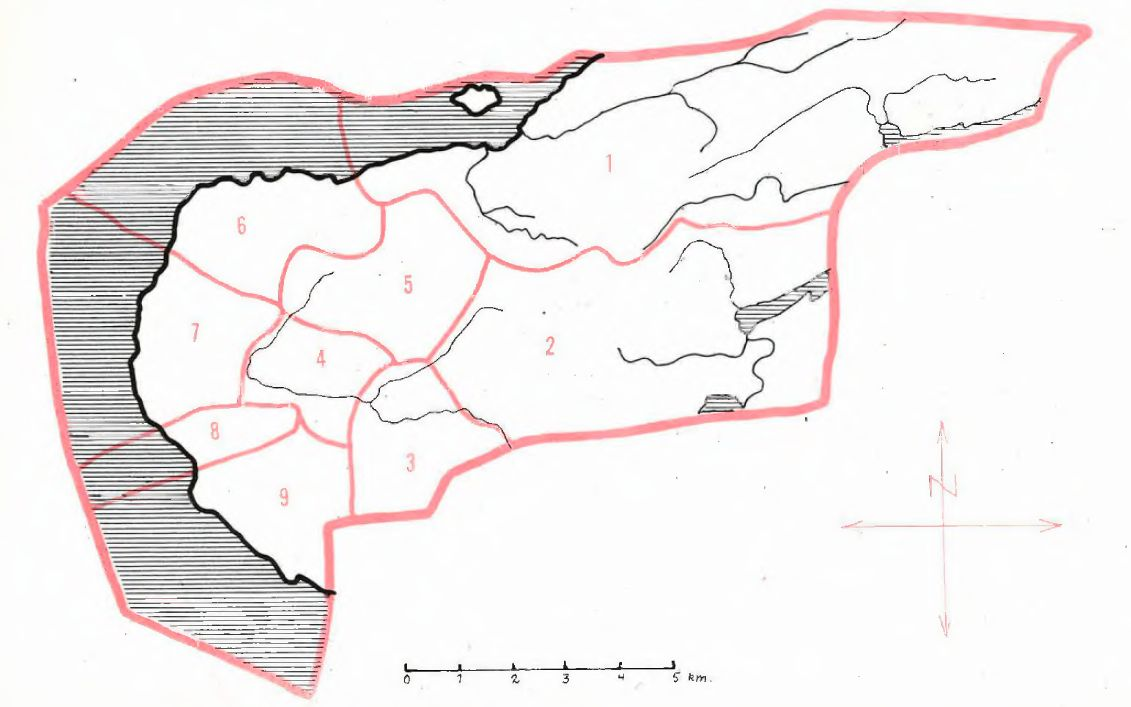
Map of the municipality in 1960 with its nine subdivisions: 1) Langstein, 2) Vassbygda, 3) Vold, 4) Mæhre, 5) Forbord, 6) Alstad, 7) Drægset, 8) Auran, and 9) Vinge

Skatval is divided in several geographical parts listed here counterclockwise from north: Langstein, Nordbygda, Sørbygda, Midtbygda, and Vassbygda. The Skatval peninsula is an important farming area, belonging to the plain districts of Trøndelag. The cultural landscape is dominated in the east by mountainous area with the highest being Forbordsfjellet at 596 metres (1,955 ft) above sea level. The mountaintop is a regional landmark.

== General information ==
The municipality of Skatval was established on 1 January 1902 when the old Nedre Stjørdalen Municipality was dissolved and it was divided into three new municipalities: Lånke Municipality (population: 1,449) in the south, Skatval Municipality (population: 2,125) in the north, and Stjørdal Municipality (population: 3,158) in the centre. During the 1960s, there were many municipal mergers across Norway due to the work of the Schei Committee. On 1 January 1962, Skatval Municipality (population 1,944) was merged with the neighboring Hegra Municipality (population: 2,704), Lånke Municipality (population: 1,967), and Stjørdal Municipality (population: 6,204) to form a new, larger Stjørdal Municipality.

=== Name ===
The municipality (originally the parish) is named after the old Skatval farm (Old Norse: Skataválir) since the first Skatval Church was built there. The first element is skat which means the "outermost end" or "something protruding". This likely is referring to the fact that the local farms lie on a flat surface that juts out at an angle between valley depressions. The last element is the plural form of váll which means "land that's cleared by burning".

=== Churches ===
The Church of Norway had one parish (sokn) within Skatval Municipality. At the time of the municipal dissolution, it was part of the Nedre Stjørdal prestegjeld and the Stjørdal prosti (deanery) in the Diocese of Nidaros.

Churches in Skatval Municipality
| Parish (sokn) | Church name | Location of the church | Year built |
|---|---|---|---|
| Skatval | Skatval Church | Skatval | 1901 |

== Geography ==
The municipality was located to the northeast of the city of Trondheim. Stjørdal Municipality was located to the south, Hegra Municipality was located to the east, Åsen Municipality was located to the north, and the Trondheimsfjord was located to the west. The highest point in the municipality was the 590-metre (1,940 ft) tall mountain Forbordsfjellet.

== Government ==
While it existed, Skatval Municipality was responsible for primary education (through 10th grade), outpatient health services, senior citizen services, welfare and other social services, zoning, economic development, and municipal roads and utilities. The municipality was governed by a municipal council of directly elected representatives. The mayor was indirectly elected by a vote of the municipal council. The municipality was under the jurisdiction of the Frostating Court of Appeal.

=== Municipal council ===
The municipal council (Herredsstyre) of Skatval Municipality was made up of 21 representatives that were elected to four year terms. The tables below show the historical composition of the council by political party.

Skatval herredsstyre 1959–1961
| Party name (in Norwegian) | Number of representatives |
|---|---|
| Labour Party (Arbeiderpartiet) | 8 |
| Centre Party (Senterpartiet) | 10 |
| Liberal Party (Venstre) | 3 |
| Total number of members: | 21 |

Skatval herredsstyre 1955–1959
| Party name (in Norwegian) | Number of representatives |
|---|---|
| Labour Party (Arbeiderpartiet) | 9 |
| Farmers' Party (Bondepartiet) | 9 |
| Liberal Party (Venstre) | 3 |
| Total number of members: | 21 |

Skatval herredsstyre 1951–1955
| Party name (in Norwegian) | Number of representatives |
|---|---|
| Labour Party (Arbeiderpartiet) | 8 |
| Farmers' Party (Bondepartiet) | 8 |
| Liberal Party (Venstre) | 4 |
| Total number of members: | 20 |

Skatval herredsstyre 1947–1951
| Party name (in Norwegian) | Number of representatives |
|---|---|
| Labour Party (Arbeiderpartiet) | 7 |
| Farmers' Party (Bondepartiet) | 9 |
| Liberal Party (Venstre) | 4 |
| Total number of members: | 20 |

Skatval herredsstyre 1945–1947
| Party name (in Norwegian) | Number of representatives |
|---|---|
| Labour Party (Arbeiderpartiet) | 7 |
| Farmers' Party (Bondepartiet) | 8 |
| Liberal Party (Venstre) | 5 |
| Total number of members: | 20 |

Skatval herredsstyre 1937–1941*
| Party name (in Norwegian) | Number of representatives |
|---|---|
| Labour Party (Arbeiderpartiet) | 6 |
| Farmers' Party (Bondepartiet) | 10 |
| Liberal Party (Venstre) | 4 |
| Total number of members: | 20 |
Note: Due to the German occupation of Norway during World War II, no elections were held for new municipal councils until after the war ended in 1945.

=== Mayors ===
The mayor (Norwegian: ordfører) of Skatval Municipality was the political leader of the municipality and the chairperson of the municipal council. Here is a list of people who held this position:

- 1902–1907: John O. Arnstad (V)
- 1908–1913: Ole Nikolai Wæhre (V)
- 1914–1934: Karl Eidsvik (H/Bp)
- 1934–1945: John Arnstad (Bp/NS)
- 1945–1945: Peder J. Arnstad (Bp)
- 1946–1947: Peter Aune (V)
- 1948–1961: Peder J. Arnstad (Bp)

== See also ==
- List of former municipalities of Norway
