= Lånke Municipality =

Former municipality in Trøndelag, Norway

Lånke Municipality Lånke herred
- Former municipality
- Laanke herred (historic name)
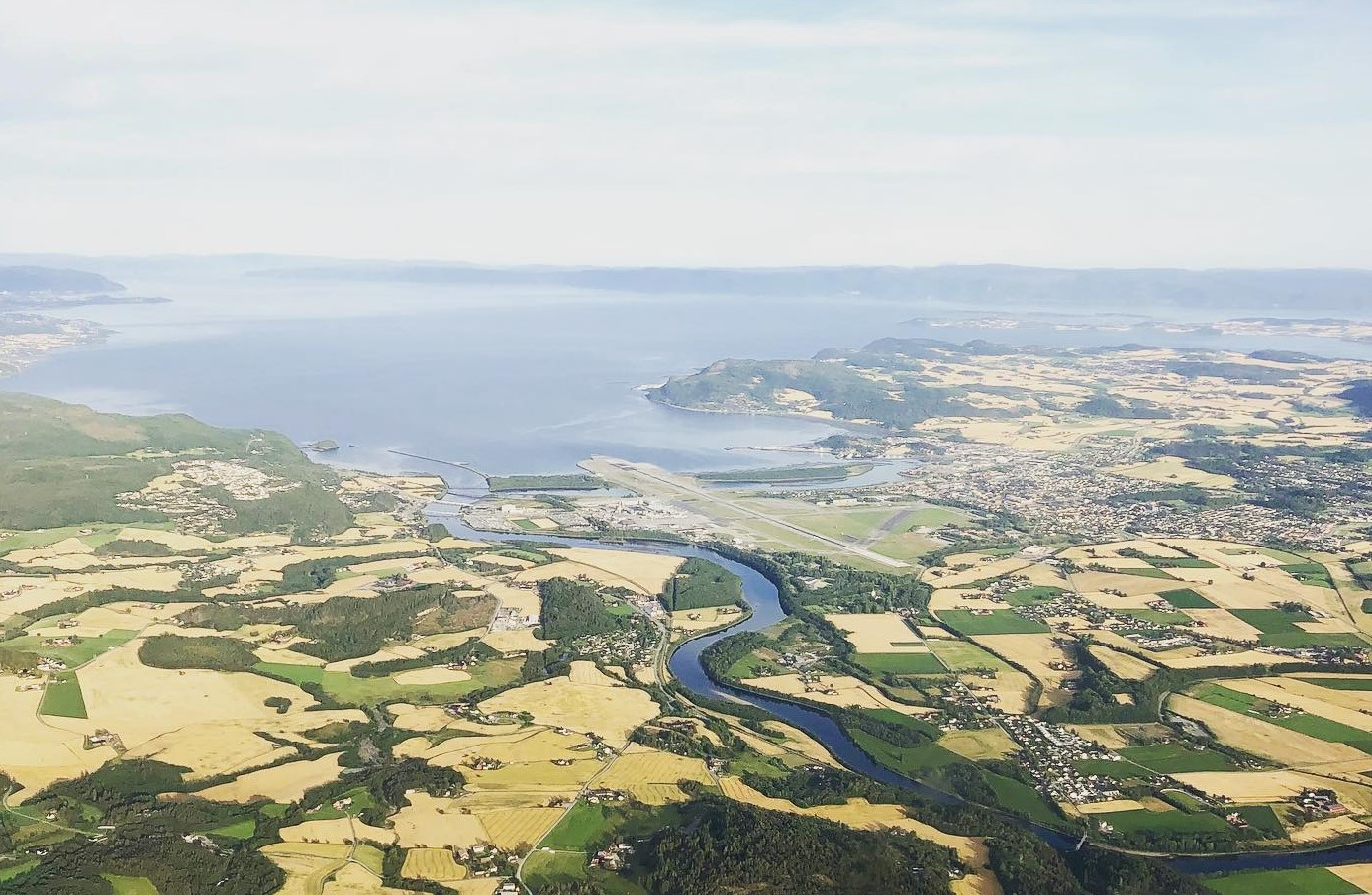
- View of the Stjørdal area with Lånke on the left of the photo

- Nord-Trøndelag within Norway

- Lånke within Nord-Trøndelag
- Coordinates: 63°26′41″N 10°56′03″E
- Country: Norway
- County: Nord-Trøndelag
- District: Stjørdalen
- Established: 1 Jan 1902
  - Preceded by: Nedre Stjørdalen Municipality
- Disestablished: 1 Jan 1962
  - Succeeded by: Stjørdal Municipality
- Administrative centre: Hell

Government
  - Mayor (1960–1961): Johan Hoås (V)

Area (upon dissolution)
  - Total: 185.4 km^{2} (71.6 sq mi)
  - Rank: #400 in Norway
- Highest elevation: 606 m (1,988 ft)

Population (1961)
  - Total: 1,976
  - Rank: #458 in Norway
  - Density: 10.7/km^{2} (28/sq mi)
  - Change (10 years): ▲ +8.6%
- Demonym: Lånkbygg

Official language
  - Norwegian form: Bokmål
- Time zone: UTC+01:00 (CET)
  - Summer (DST): UTC+02:00 (CEST)
- ISO 3166 code: NO-1713

Lånke was a former municipality in the old Nord-Trøndelag county, Norway. The 185-square-kilometre (71 sq mi) municipality existed from 1902 until its dissolution in 1962. The municipality was located south of the Stjørdalselva river in what is now the south-central part of Stjørdal Municipality in Trøndelag county. The administrative centre was located in the village of Hell. The famous Hell Station in the village of Hell is situated in the westernmost part of Lånke. There are two churches in Lånke: Lånke Church and Elvran Chapel. Historically, this parish was also known as Leksdal. Lånke is an area dominated by agriculture and forests.

Prior to its dissolution in 1962, the 185.4-square-kilometre (71.6 sq mi) municipality was the 400th largest by area out of the 731 municipalities in Norway. Lånke Municipality was the 458th most populous municipality in Norway with a population of about 1,976. The municipality's population density was 10.7 inhabitants per square kilometre (28/sq mi) and its population had increased by 8.6% over the previous 10-year period.

== General information ==
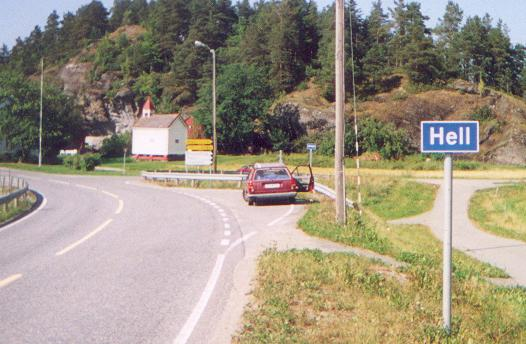
View of the village of Hell in Lånke

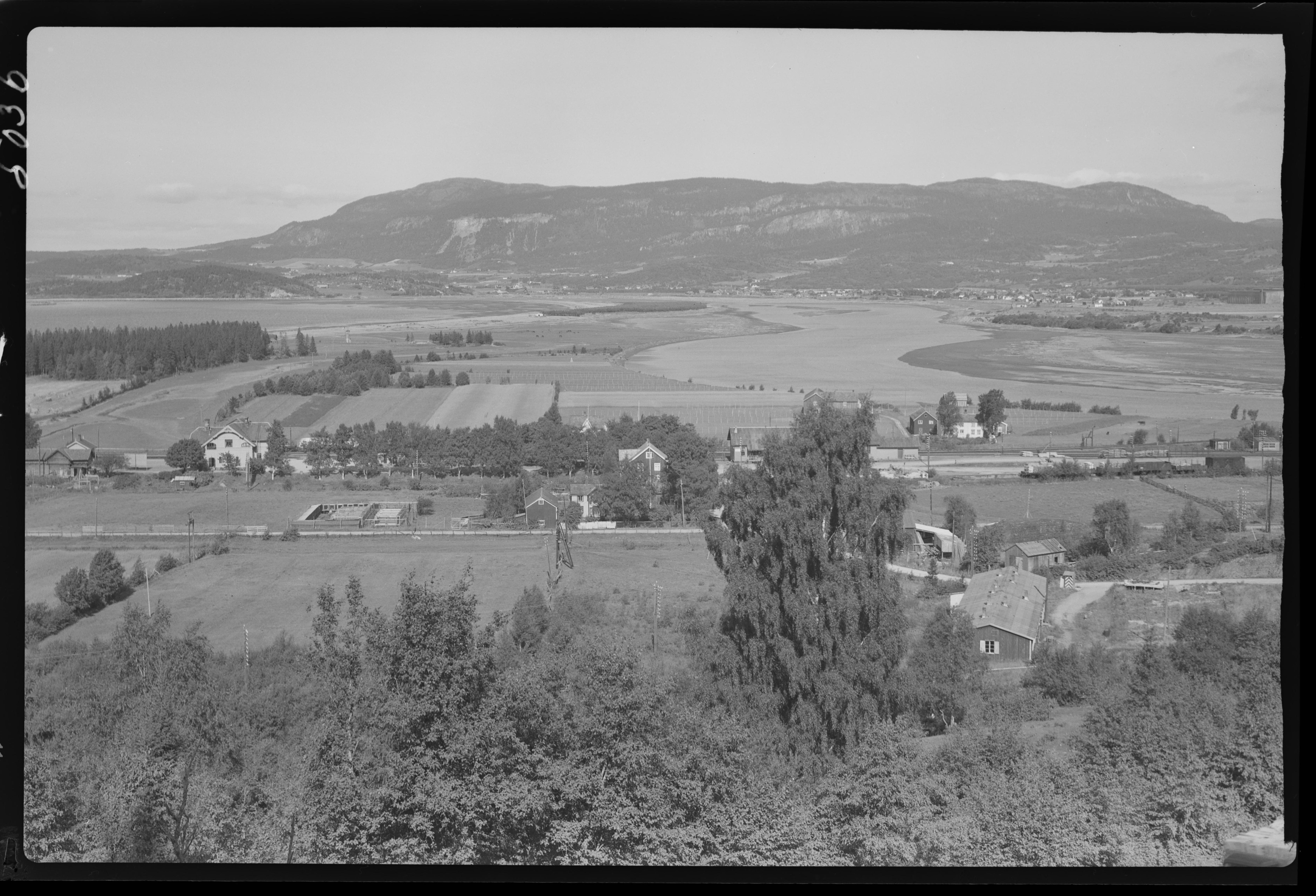
View of Hell (c. 1948)

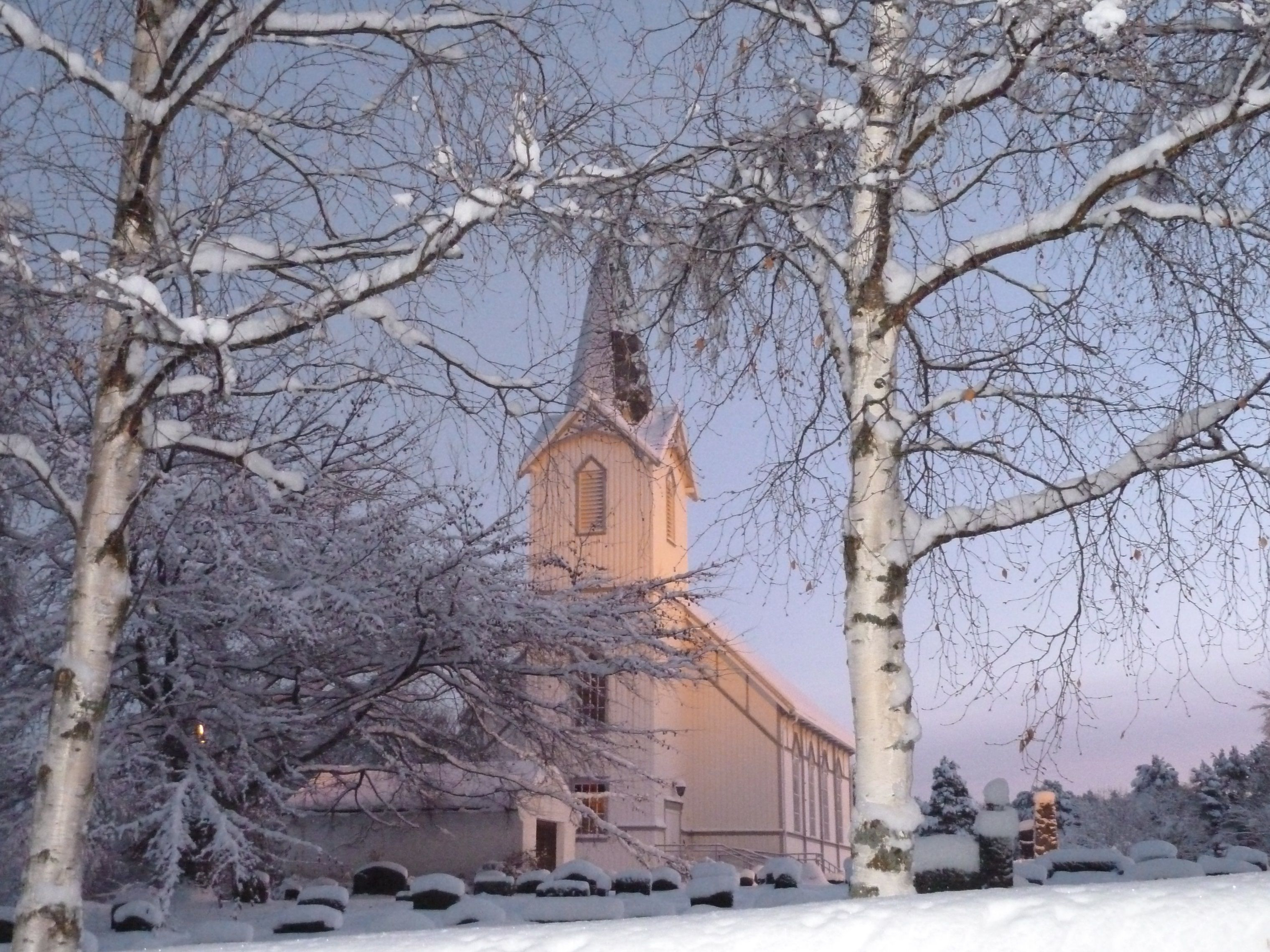
View of Lånke Church

The municipality of Laanke was created on 1 January 1902 when the old Nedre Stjørdalen Municipality was split into three new municipalities: Laanke Municipality (population: 1,449) in the south, Stjørdal Municipality (population: 3,158) in the center, and Skatval Municipality (population: 2,125) in the north. On 1 January 1914 the small Jøssås area of southwestern Laanke Municipality (population: 38) was transferred to the neighboring Malvik Municipality which at that time was in the neighboring county of Sør-Trøndelag. The spelling of the municipality was later changed to Lånke.

During the 1960s, there were many municipal mergers across Norway due to the work of the Schei Committee. On 1 January 1962, Lånke Municipality (population: 1,967) was merged with the neighboring Stjørdal Municipality (population: 6,204), Hegra Municipality (population: 2,704), and Skatval Municipality (population: 1,944) to form a new, larger Stjørdal Municipality.

=== Name ===
The municipality (originally the parish) is named after the old Laanke farm (Old Norse: Lǫnku) since the first Lånke Church was built there. The name comes from the genitive case of the Old Norse word langr which means "long", perhaps referring to the long flat area along the river Stjørdalselva.

On 21 December 1917, a royal resolution enacted the 1917 Norwegian language reforms. Prior to this change, the name was spelled Laanke with the digraph "aa", and after this reform, the name was spelled Lånke, using the letter å was instead.

=== Churches ===
The Church of Norway had one parish (sokn) within Lånke Municipality. At the time of the municipal dissolution, it was part of the Nedre Stjørdal prestegjeld and the Stjørdal prosti (deanery) in the Diocese of Nidaros.

Churches in Lånke Municipality
Parish (sokn)	Church name	Location of the church	Year built
Lånke	Lånke Church	Hell	1899
Lånke	Elvran Chapel	Elvran	1893

== Geography ==
The municipality was located east of the city of Trondheim. Stjørdal Municipality was located to the north, Hegra Municipality was located to the east, Selbu Municipality (in Sør-Trøndelag county) was to the south, and Malvik Municipality (also in Sør-Trøndelag) was to the west. The highest point in the municipality was the 606-metre (1,988 ft) tall mountain Klimpan.

== Government ==
While it existed, Lånke Municipality was responsible for primary education (through 10th grade), outpatient health services, senior citizen services, welfare and other social services, zoning, economic development, and municipal roads and utilities. The municipality was governed by a municipal council of directly elected representatives. The mayor was indirectly elected by a vote of the municipal council. The municipality was under the jurisdiction of the Frostating Court of Appeal.

=== Municipal council ===
The municipal council (Herredsstyre) of Lånke Municipality was made up of 17 representatives that were elected to four year terms. The tables below show the historical composition of the council by political party.

Lånke herredsstyre 1959–1961
Party name (in Norwegian)	Number of representatives
Labour Party (Arbeiderpartiet)	7
Christian Democratic Party (Kristelig Folkeparti)	2
Centre Party (Senterpartiet)	5
Liberal Party (Venstre)	3
Total number of members:	17

Lånke herredsstyre 1955–1959
Party name (in Norwegian)	Number of representatives
Labour Party (Arbeiderpartiet)	8
Christian Democratic Party (Kristelig Folkeparti)	2
Farmers' Party (Bondepartiet)	5
Liberal Party (Venstre)	2
Total number of members:	17

Lånke herredsstyre 1951–1955
Party name (in Norwegian)	Number of representatives
Labour Party (Arbeiderpartiet)	7
Christian Democratic Party (Kristelig Folkeparti)	2
Farmers' Party (Bondepartiet)	4
Liberal Party (Venstre)	3
Total number of members:	16

Lånke herredsstyre 1947–1951
Party name (in Norwegian)	Number of representatives
Labour Party (Arbeiderpartiet)	6
Christian Democratic Party (Kristelig Folkeparti)	2
Farmers' Party (Bondepartiet)	4
Liberal Party (Venstre)	4
Total number of members:	16

Lånke herredsstyre 1945–1947
Party name (in Norwegian)	Number of representatives
Labour Party (Arbeiderpartiet)	7
Farmers' Party (Bondepartiet)	4
Liberal Party (Venstre)	5
Total number of members:	16

Lånke herredsstyre 1937–1941*
Party name (in Norwegian)	Number of representatives
Labour Party (Arbeiderpartiet)	6
Farmers' Party (Bondepartiet)	6
Liberal Party (Venstre)	4
Total number of members:	16
Note: Due to the German occupation of Norway during World War II, no elections were held for new municipal councils until after the war ended in 1945.

=== Mayors ===
The mayor (Norwegian: ordfører) of Lånke Municipality was the political leader of the municipality and the chairperson of the municipal council. Here is a list of people who held this position:

- 1902–1913: Andreas Thyholt (H)
- 1914–1922: Torstein Sætnan (H/Bp)
- 1923–1928: Olaf Jullum (Bp)
- 1929–1937: Lorents Stenvig (Bp)
- 1938–1941: Halvard Havdal (Bp)
- 1941–1944: Tøllef Elverum (NS)
- 1944–1945: Ole O. Elverum (NS)
- 1945–1945: Osvald Nordback (NS)
- 1945–1945: Halvard Havdal (Bp)
- 1946–1951: Johan Hoås (V)
- 1952–1955: Oskar Sletne (Ap)
- 1956–1957: Iver O. Jullum (Bp)
- 1957–1959: Gustav Stuberg (Bp)
- 1960–1961: Johan Hoås (V)

== See also ==
- List of former municipalities of Norway
