= Kvithammer =

Village in Stjørdal Municipality, Norway

Kvithammer Kvithammar
- Village
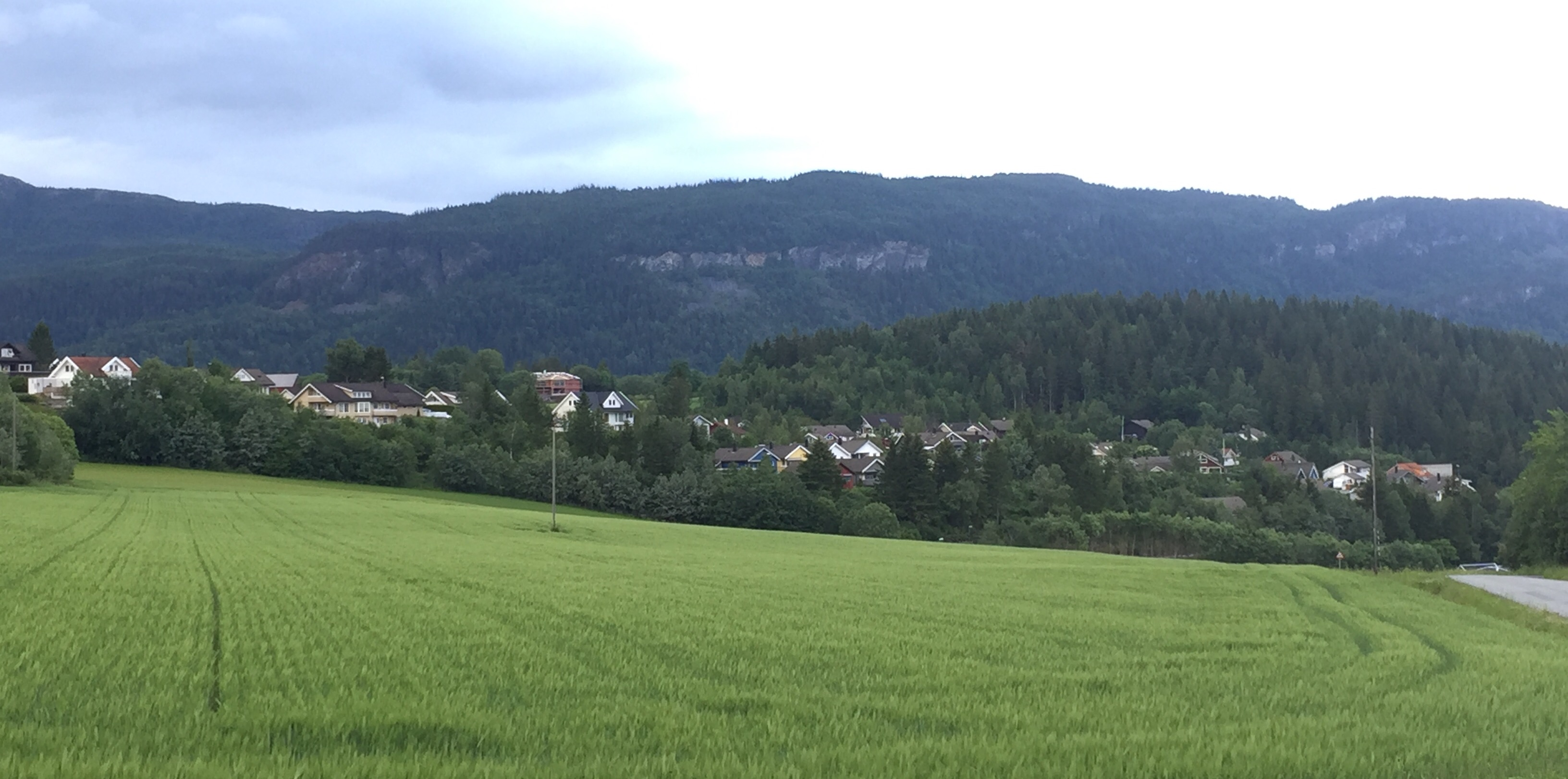
- View of the village
- Interactive map of Kvithammer; Kvithammar
- Location within Trøndelag Location within Norway
- Coordinates: 63.4909°N 10.8894°E
- Country: Norway
- Region: Central Norway
- County: Trøndelag
- District: Stjørdalen
- Municipality: Stjørdal Municipality

Area
  - Total: 0.13 km^{2} (0.050 sq mi)
- Elevation: 40 m (130 ft)

Population (2019)
  - Total: 211
  - Density: 1,623/km^{2} (4,200/sq mi)
- Time zone: UTC+01:00 (CET)
  - Summer (DST): UTC+02:00 (CEST)
- Post Code: 7500 Stjørdal

Kvithammer or Kvithammar is a village in Stjørdal Municipality in Trøndelag county, Norway. It is located in the northwestern part of the municipality, about 3 kilometres (1.9 mi) northwest of the town of Stjørdalshalsen and a short distance southeast of the village of Skatval.

The 0.13-square-kilometre (32-acre) village had a population (2019) of 211 and a population density of 1,623 inhabitants per square kilometre (4,200/sq mi). Since 2019, the population and area data for this village area has not been separately tracked by Statistics Norway.

Kvithammar is mainly known for the Bioforsk Grassland and Landscape Division which is an agricultural research station in the area. It is located on the Skatval peninsula, about 4 kilometres (2.5 mi) south of the Forbordsfjellet mountain.
