= Skatval =

Village in Stjørdal Municipality, Norway

- Village
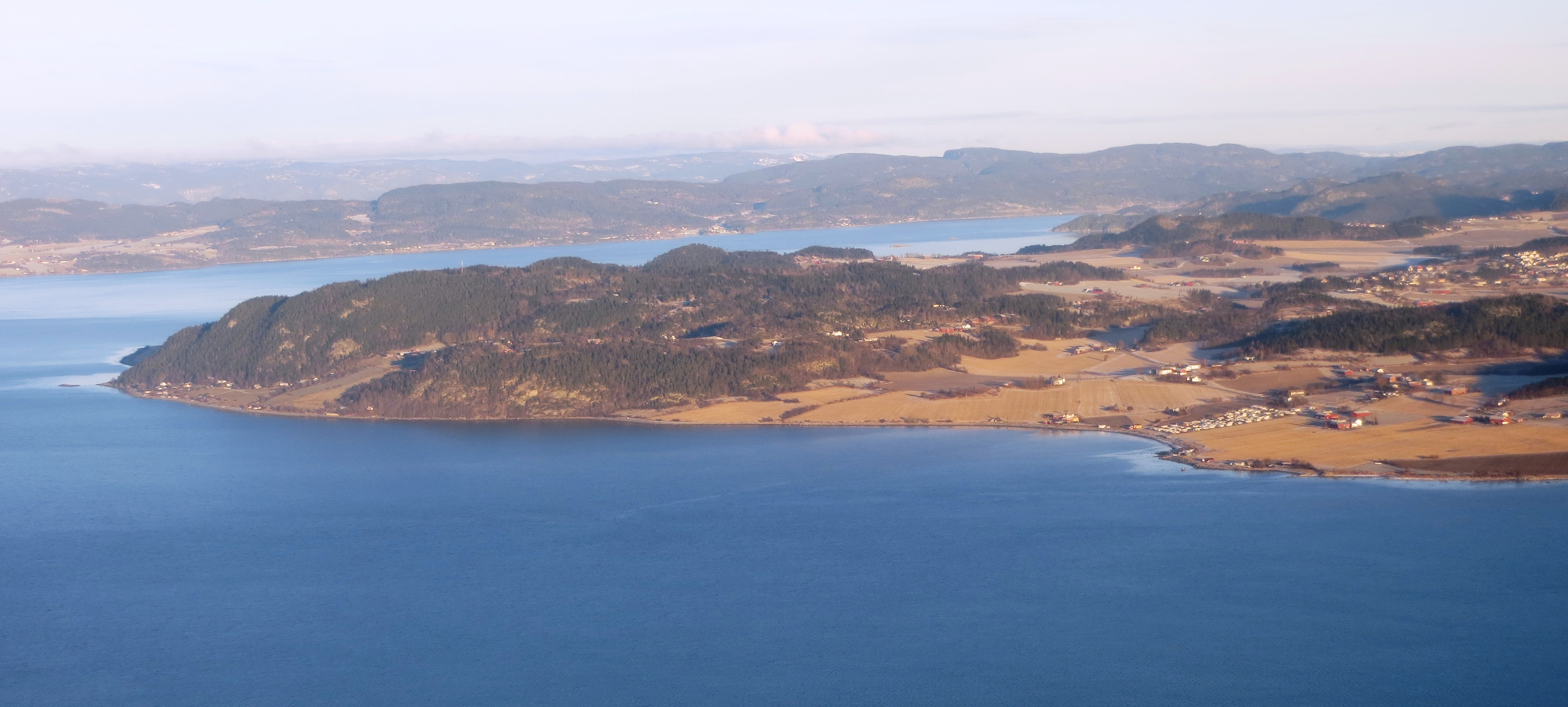
- View of the village on the peninsula
- Interactive map of Skatval
- Location within Trøndelag Location within Norway
- Coordinates: 63.5091°N 10.8258°E
- Country: Norway
- Region: Central Norway
- County: Trøndelag
- District: Stjørdalen
- Municipality: Stjørdal Municipality

Area
  - Total: 0.59 km^{2} (0.23 sq mi)
- Elevation: 67 m (220 ft)

Population (2024)
  - Total: 967
  - Density: 1,639/km^{2} (4,240/sq mi)
- Time zone: UTC+01:00 (CET)
  - Summer (DST): UTC+02:00 (CEST)
- Post Code: 7510 Skatval

Skatval is a village in Stjørdal Municipality in Trøndelag county, Norway. It is located on the Skatval peninsula about 8 kilometres (5.0 mi) northwest of the town of Stjørdalshalsen. The inhabitants are called as Skatvalsbygg. Skatval Church is located in the village.

The 0.59-square-kilometre (150-acre) village has a population (2024) of 967 and a population density of 1,639 inhabitants per square kilometre (4,240/sq mi).

== History ==
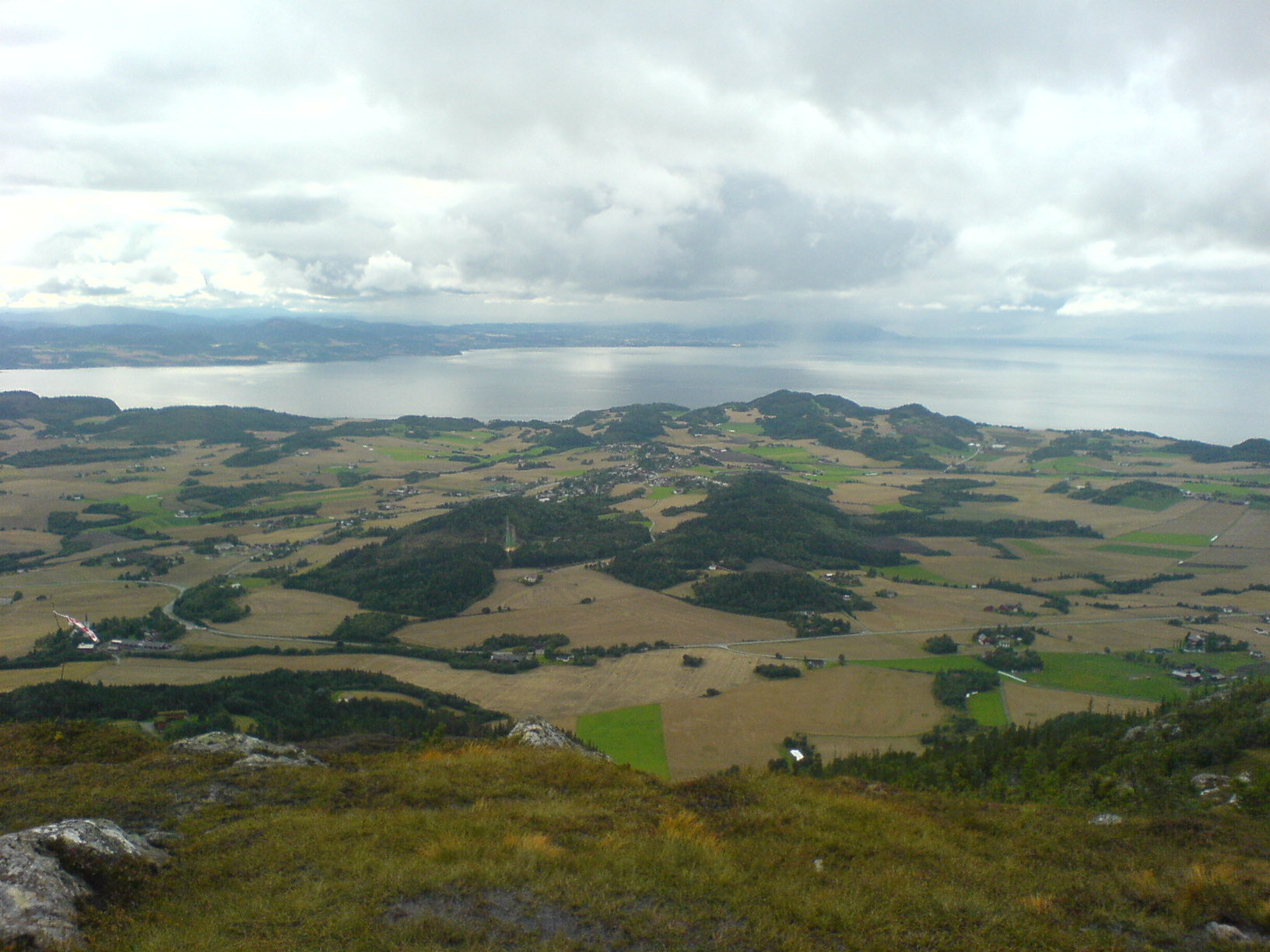
Midtbygda as seen from Forbordsfjellet

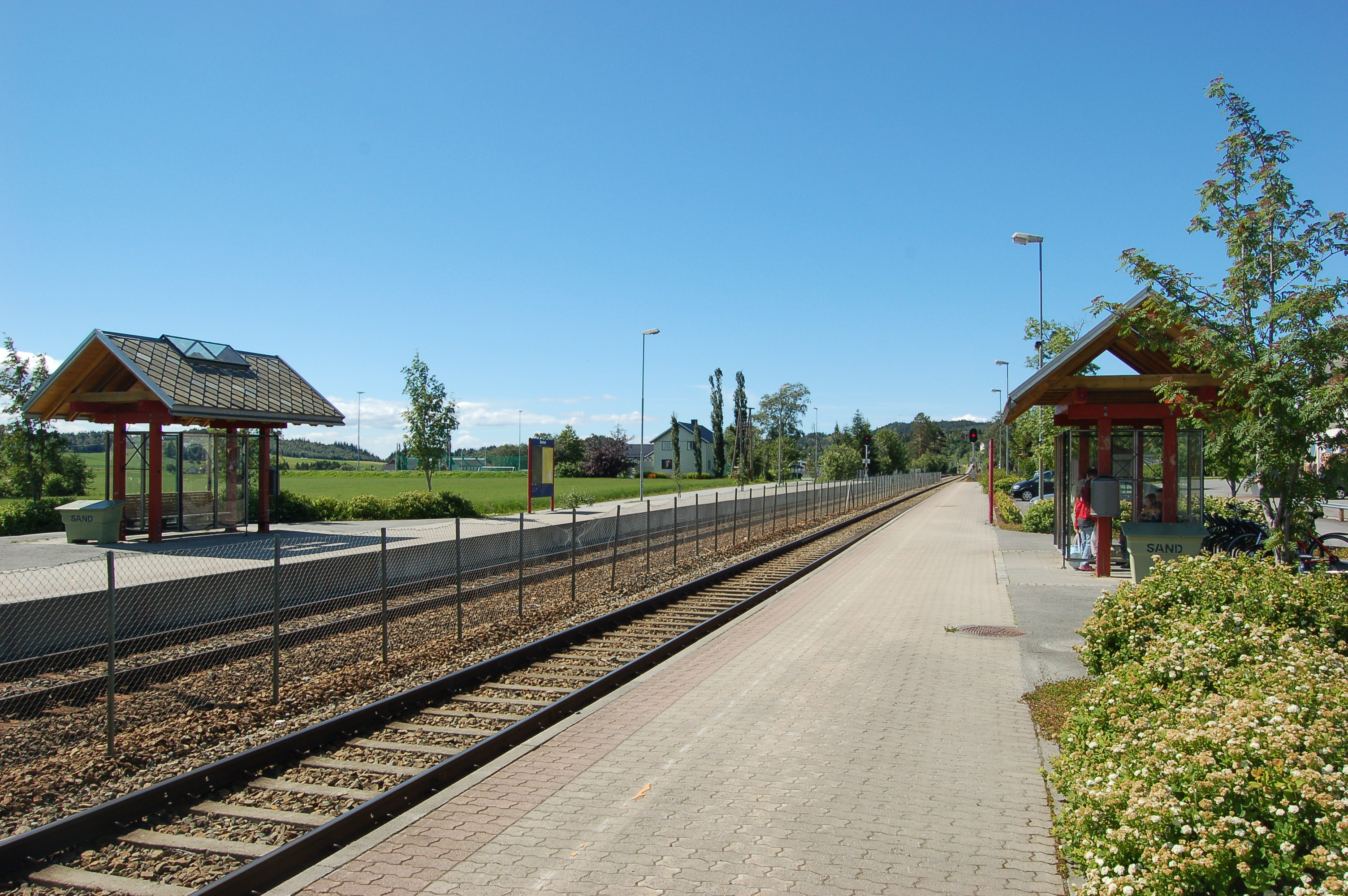
Skatval Station

The southwestern coast of the peninsula was called Aglo during the Viking Age. In autumn 962, Sigurd Håkonsson Ladejarl (the ruling Earl of Trøndelag and surrounding areas) and his party were burned to death by the Erikssønene (sons of Eric Bloodaxe), among them Harald Greyhide, while staying the night at a party at Oglo (Aglo), according to the Heimskringla by Snorri Sturlasson.

The remains of Steinvikholm Castle, built during the 1530s by Norway's last Catholic archbishop, Olav Engelbrektsson, are under restoration. The fortress, innovative in design, played a major part as the last stronghold for Norwegian independence during the Reformation in the Danish-Norwegian union. The islet situated at the northern coast of Skatval is also the place for the yearly outdoor midnight opera "Olav Engelbrektsson".

The old Fløan Church was located in Fløan, on the northern coast of the Skatval peninsula. It was the main church for the Skatval area. It was taken down in 1851, and a new Skatval Church was built in 1901 in the village of Skatval. Materials from the old church are now in a museum in Trondheim.

On 1 January 1902, the Skatvold peninsula was established as the new Skatval Municipality when the old Nedre Stjørdalen Municipality was divided into three parts: Skatval Municipality, Stjørdal Municipality, and Lånke Municipality. On 1 January 1962, Skatval Municipality was merged with Lånke Municipality, Stjørdal Municipality, and Hegra Municipality to form a new, larger Stjørdal Municipality.

== Transport ==
The Nordland Line runs through Skatval, with a stop at Skatval Station, with hourly Trøndelag Commuter Rail service. The station opened on 29 October 1902 and was designed by Paul Due. The station is 41.9 kilometres (26.0 mi) from Trondheim. European Route E6 runs through Skatval.

== Sports ==
The community has a football team, IL Fram, that plays in the 4th division. The village and surrounding areas also have many sports facilities such as:

- Klempen Ski Arena: lighted cross country track, biathlon shooting range and several ski jumps, some with summer capabilities.
- Langstein: lighted cross country track.
- Framnes: artificial turf football field with flood lights.
- Skatvalshallen: indoor sports hall.
- Skjervold: tennis court.

== Notable people ==
- Jon Olav Alstad, a politician
- Eli Arnstad, a civil servant
- Marit Arnstad, a politician and former Norwegian Minister of Petroleum and Energy
- Oscar Midtlyng, an athlete
- Brit Sandaune, a soccer player
- Sverre Dahlen Aspenes, a biathlete
