= Ole Falck Ebbell =

Norwegian architect (1839–1919)

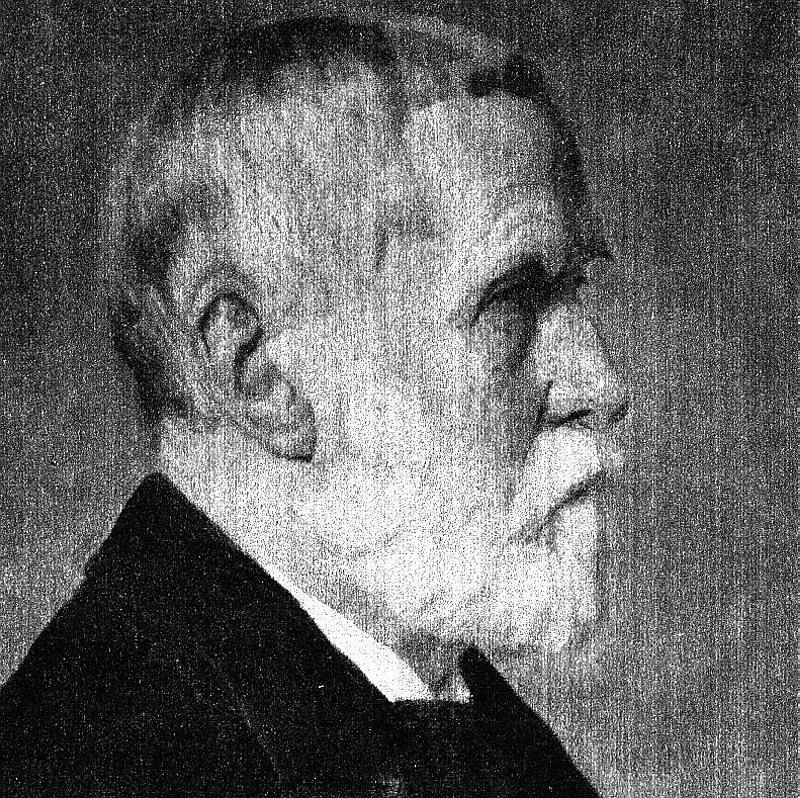
- Ole Falck Ebbell
- Born: September 13, 1839; Oslo, Norway
- Died: June 29, 1919 (aged 79)
- Occupation: Architect
- Children: Ole-Falk Ebbell-Staehelin
- Parent: Ole Falck Ebbell

Ole Falck Ebbell (13 September 1839 – 29 June 1919) was a Norwegian architect. He worked primarily in Trondheim, but he was also responsible for the design of buildings in other parts of Norway.

== Biography ==
Ole Falck Ebbell was born in Christiania now Oslo), Norway. He was the son of a lawyer, Ole Falck Ebbell. He studied architecture at the Polytechnicum in Hannover, Germany and engineering at Technische Hochschule in Zürich, Switzerland and had several years of work in Oslo before he came to Trondheim. He was a teacher of mechanics and architecture at Trondheim Technical Learning Institution, the precursor to the Norwegian Institute of Technology in 1871 and in 1891 he became the teacher of architecture and head of the architectural department. He was a member of the commission for the restoration of the Nidaros Cathedral in Trondheim (1882-1894). He was also known for several works in different parts of the country.

Ole Falck Ebbell was married to Elisa Brun (1839-1911) They had a son Ole-Falk Ebbell (1879–1969), later known as: Ole-Falk Ebbell-Staehelin, who became a civil engineer. He contributed to the completion of the Second Goetheanum in Dornach, Switzerland.

== Selected works ==
- Trondheim Library - former City Hall in Trondheim (rebuilt 1870)
- Sør-Trøndelag University College - formerly Rotvoll Asylum in Trondheim (1872)
- Eg Psychiatric Hospital in Kristiansand (1881)
- Kalvskinnet School in Trondheim (1885)
- Elvran Chapel in Stjørdal Municipality in Trøndelag county (1893)
- Snillfjord Church in Orkland Municipality in Trøndelag county (1898)
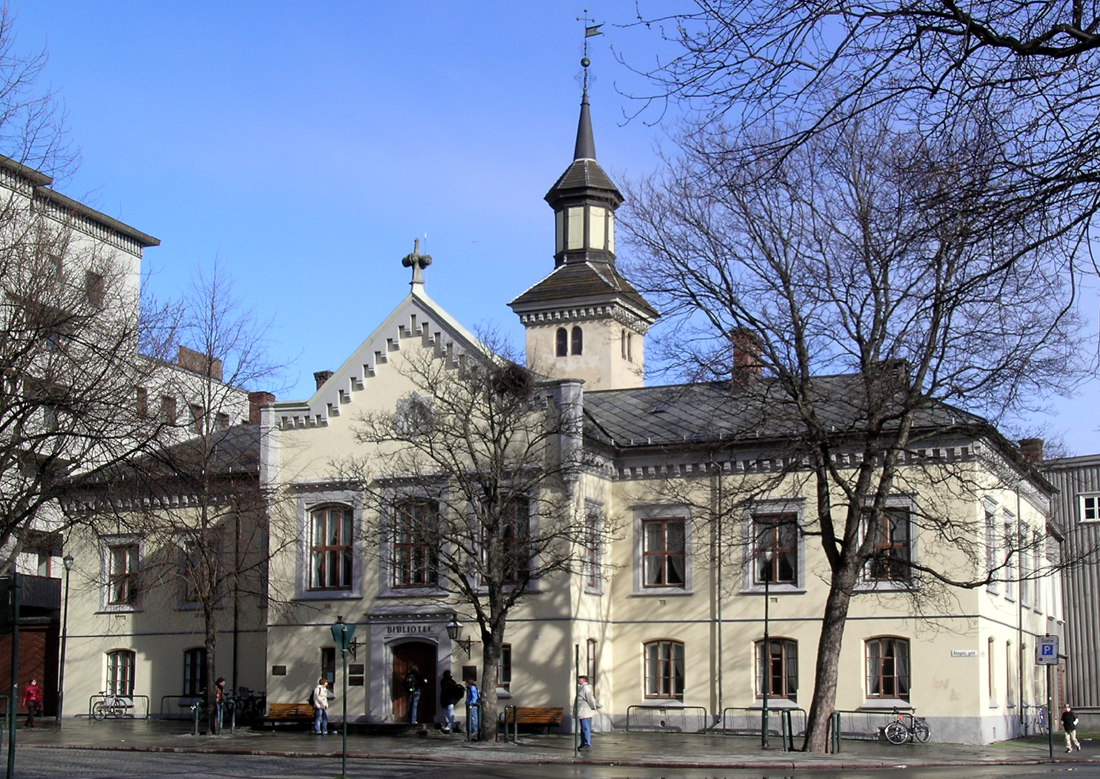
Trondheim Library - former City Hall in Trondheim (rebuilt 1870)

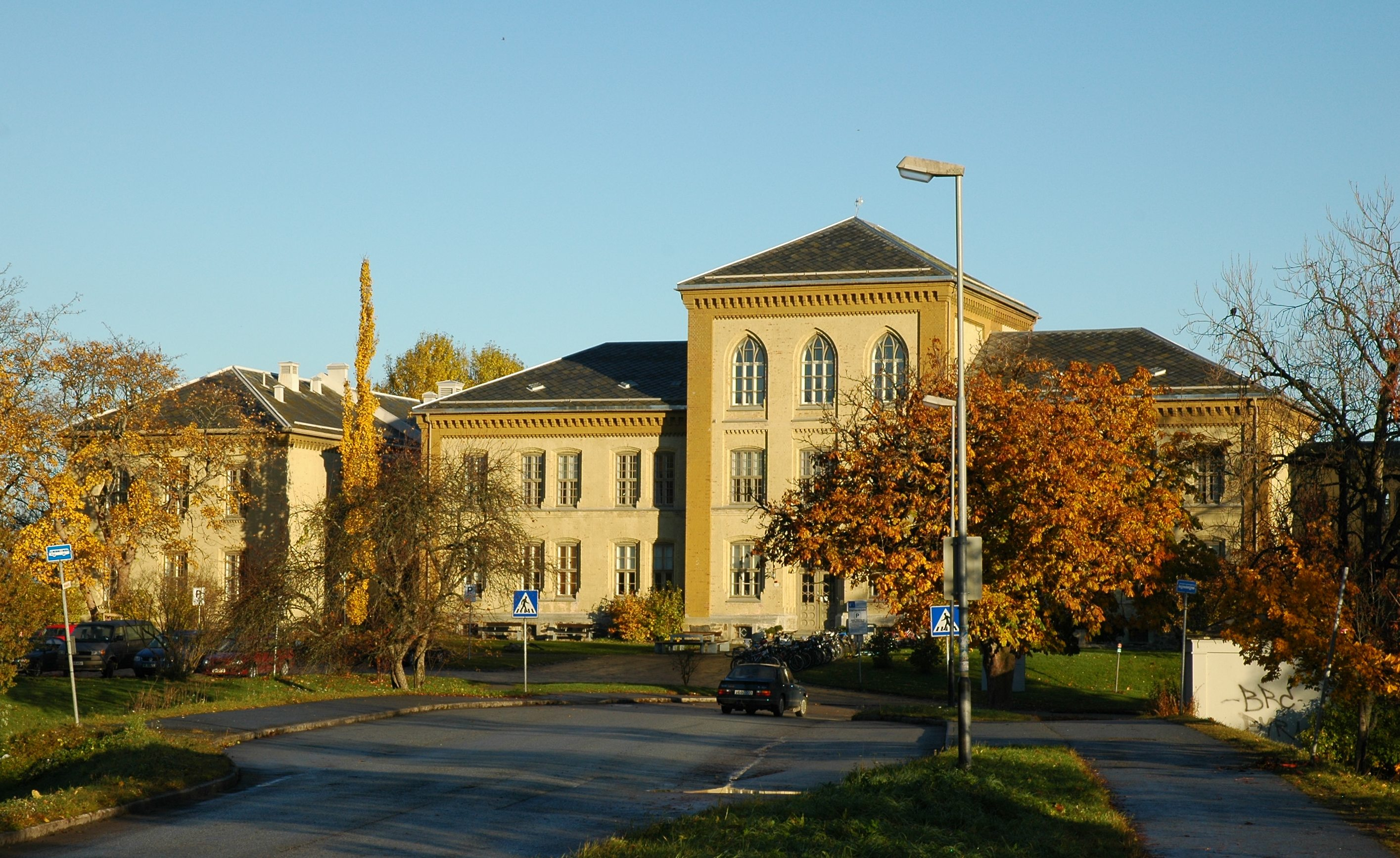
Sør-Trøndelag University College - formerly Rotvoll Asylum (1872)

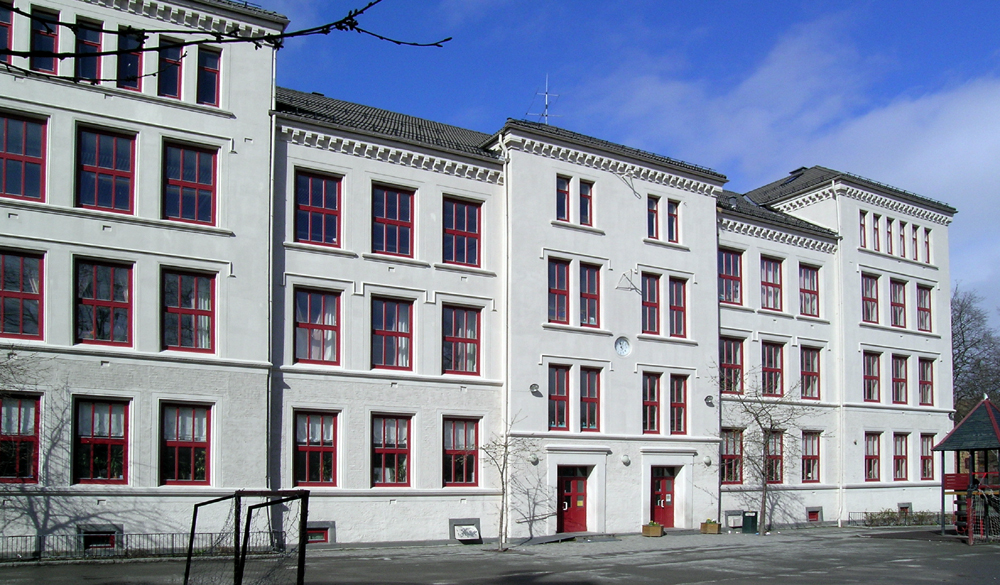
Kalvskinnet school in Trondheim (1885)
