= Snillfjord Church =

Church in Trøndelag, Norway

- Snillfjord kirke
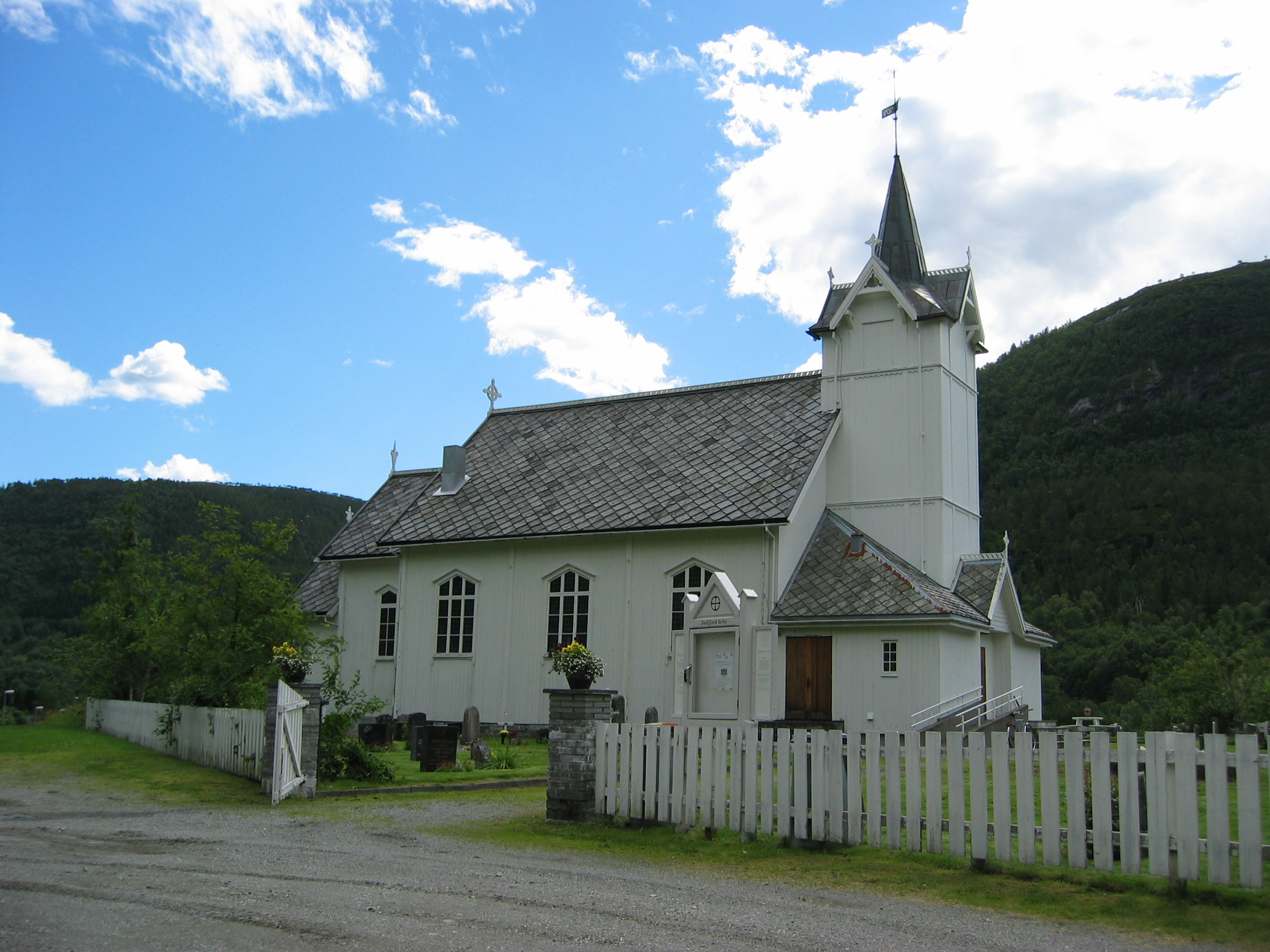
- View of the church
- Snillfjord Church
- 63°24′00″N 9°30′24″E
- Location: Orkland Municipality, Trøndelag
- Country: Norway
- Denomination: Church of Norway
- Churchmanship: Evangelical Lutheran

History
- Status: Parish church
- Founded: 1899
- Consecrated: 27 Sep 1899

Architecture
- Functional status: Active
- Architect: Ole Falck Ebbell
- Architectural type: Long church
- Completed: 1899 (127 years ago)

Specifications
- Capacity: 250
- Materials: Wood

Administration
- Diocese: Nidaros bispedømme
- Deanery: Orkdal prosti
- Parish: Snillfjord
- Norwegian Cultural Heritage Site
- Type: Church
- Status: Not protected
- ID: 85506

Snillfjord Church (Norwegian: Snillfjord kirke) is a parish church of the Church of Norway in Orkland Municipality in Trøndelag county, Norway. It is located in the village of Krokstadøra. It is the church for the Snillfjord parish which is part of the Orkdal prosti (deanery) in the Diocese of Nidaros. The white, wooden church was built in a long church style in 1899 by the architect Ole Falck Ebbell. The church seats about 250 people.

== History ==
The church in Snillfjord was built in 1898–1899. The architect was Ole Falck Ebbell and the lead builders were Ole and Johan Væge. The new building was consecrated on 27 September 1899 by the Bishop Johannes Skaar. The baptismal sacristy was built in 1978, and the church underwent a restoration in 1989.

== See also ==
- List of churches in Nidaros
