= Forbordsfjellet =

Mountain in Trøndelag, Norway

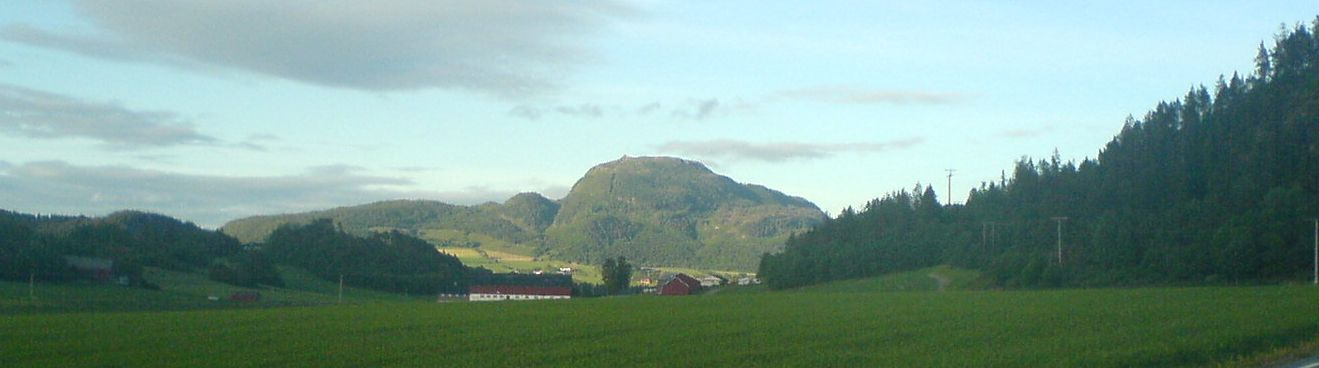
- Forbordsfjellet seen from Rykkja

Highest point
- Elevation: 590 m (1,940 ft)
- Prominence: 365 m (1,198 ft)
- Coordinates: 63°31′32″N 10°53′22″E

Geography
- Interactive map of the mountain
- Location: Trøndelag, Norway
- Topo map(s): 1621 I Stjørdal and 1622 II Frosta

Forbordsfjellet is a mountain in Stjørdal Municipality in Trøndelag county, Norway. The 590-metre (1,940 ft) tall mountain lies directly to the north of Trondheim Airport, Værnes and the town of Stjørdalshalsen and about 4 kilometres (2.5 mi) northeast of the village of Skatval. There is a toll road to the summit from European route E6 near Skatval Church.

Forbordsfjellet is also used for paragliding. IL Fram organizes a 4.8-kilometre (3.0 mi) long backhill race that starts at Skatval Church and has a finish at the top of the mountain. Many tourists and residents come to the top to look at the views of the lower Stjørdalen valley, the Åsenfjorden, and towards Trondheim.

The name comes from the little farming village of Forbord, located west of the mountain. The name Forbord supposedly means "at the foot of the mountain". Thus, the name Forbordsfjellet can, oddly enough, be translated into "at the foot of the mountain-mountain". The solution to this logical problem may be that the hamlet at the foot of the mountain may have been named Forbord first, but when the locals forgot the name of the mountain, they simply called it Forbordsfjellet, meaning the mountain at Forbord. There are no other known names on the mountain.

A popular destination for hiking is Svartkamhytta.

== See also ==
- List of mountains of Norway by height
