= Fløan Church =

Church in Trøndelag, Norway

- Fløan kirke
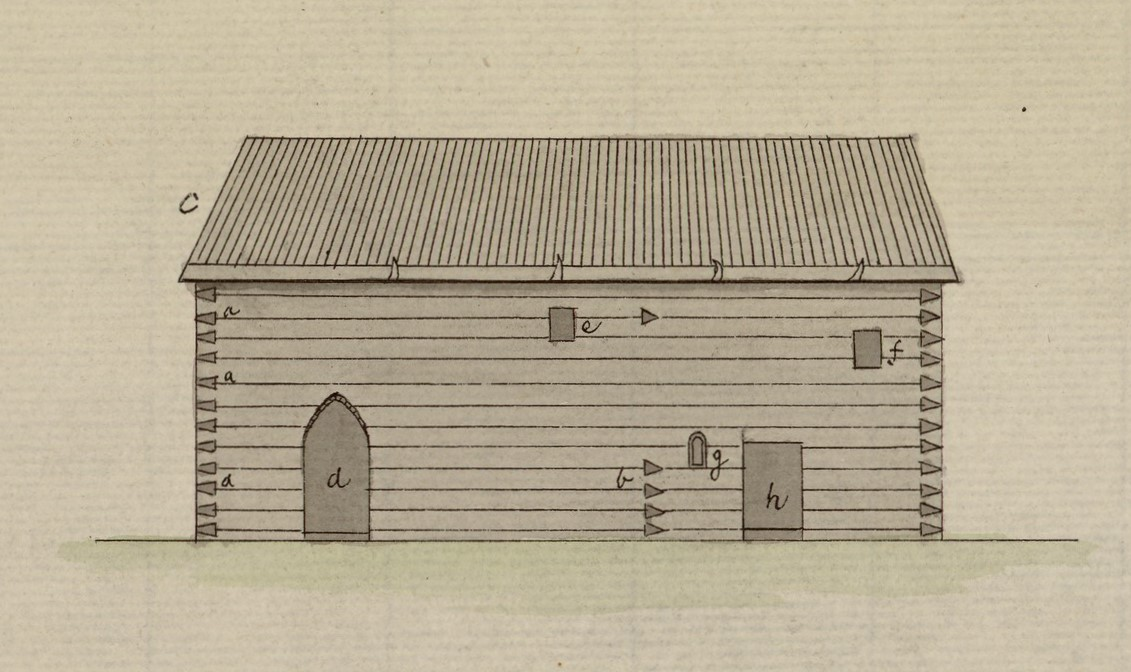
- View of a drawing of Fløan church by Gerhard Schøning (1774), reproduced by Henrik Mathiesen (1890)
- Fløan Church
- 63.5349°N 10.7881°E
- Location: Stjørdal Municipality, Trøndelag
- Country: Norway
- Denomination: Church of Norway
- Churchmanship: Evangelical Lutheran

History
- Status: Parish church

Architecture
- Functional status: Demolished
- Architectural type: Long church
- Completed: 15th century
- Closed: 17th century

Specifications
- Materials: Wood

Administration
- Diocese: Nidaros

Fløan Church (Norwegian: Fløan kirke) was a medieval church that stood in the village of Fløan in the Skatval area of present-day Stjørdal Municipality in Trøndelag county, Norway. The church was located about 12 kilometres (7.5 mi) northwest of the town of Stjørdalshalsen. Materials from Fløan Church are displayed at the Trøndelag Folkemuseum at Sverresborg in Trondheim.

== History ==
The first written record of the church is in the Aslak Bolts jordebok. In 1432 Aslak Bolt, Bishop of the Archdiocese of Nidaros, commissioned this land register which listed lands, estates, and revenues associated with the diocese. The church was closed after the Reformation and finally completely demolished in 1851.

The church has been carbon dated to 1420. Other medieval history indicates that for some time before the current building existed there stood another church at the same location.
