= Elvran Chapel =

Church in Trøndelag, Norway

- Elvran kapell
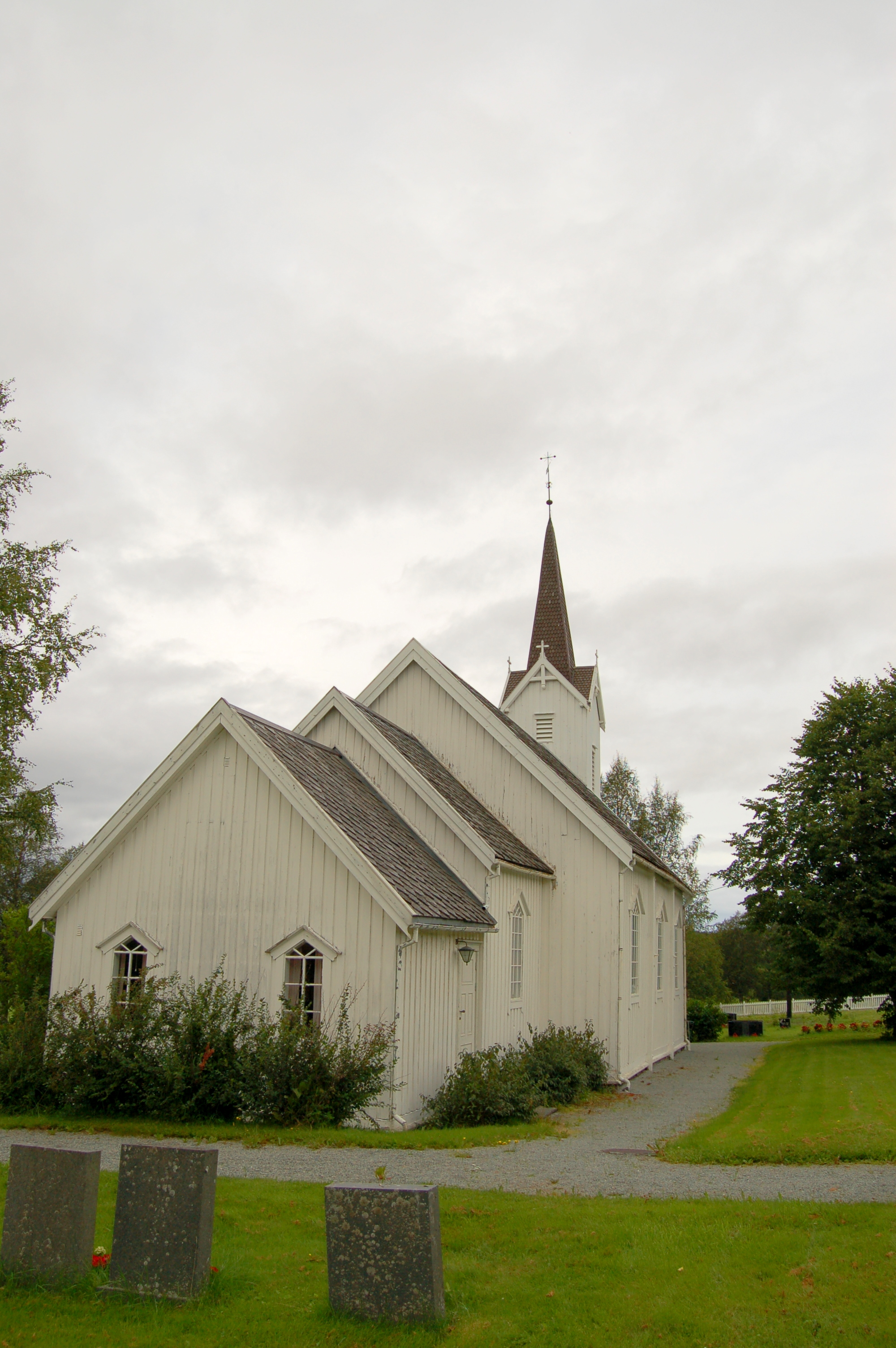
- View of the church
- Elvran Chapel
- 63.393528509°N 11.066025942°E
- Location: Stjørdal Municipality, Trøndelag
- Country: Norway
- Denomination: Church of Norway
- Churchmanship: Evangelical Lutheran

History
- Status: Parish church
- Founded: 1893
- Consecrated: 22 Feb 1893

Architecture
- Functional status: Active
- Architect: Ole Falck Ebbell
- Architectural type: Long church
- Completed: 1893 (133 years ago)

Specifications
- Capacity: 150
- Materials: Wood

Administration
- Diocese: Nidaros bispedømme
- Deanery: Stjørdal prosti
- Parish: Lånke
- Norwegian Cultural Heritage Site
- Type: Church
- Status: Not protected
- ID: 84093

Elvran Chapel (Norwegian: Elvran kapell) is a parish church of the Church of Norway in Stjørdal Municipality in Trøndelag county, Norway. It is located in the village of Elvran. It is one of the churches for the Lånke parish which is part of the Stjørdal prosti (deanery) in the Diocese of Nidaros. The white, wooden church was built in a long church style in 1893 using plans drawn up by the architect Ole Falck Ebbell. The church seats about 150 people.

== History ==
The Elvran area historically belonged to the Lånke Church parish. The road to Lånke was perceived as long and strenuous, and the church there was in poor condition in the early 1890s so demands were made for a church building at Elvran. Local residents made the formal request in 1891 and that was followed by a royal decree in 1892 that authorized the construction of the new chapel. It was consecrated on 22 February 1893. In 1968, a sacristy was built adjacent to the choir.

== See also ==
- List of churches in Nidaros
