= Skatval Church =

Church in Trøndelag, Norway

- Skatval kirke
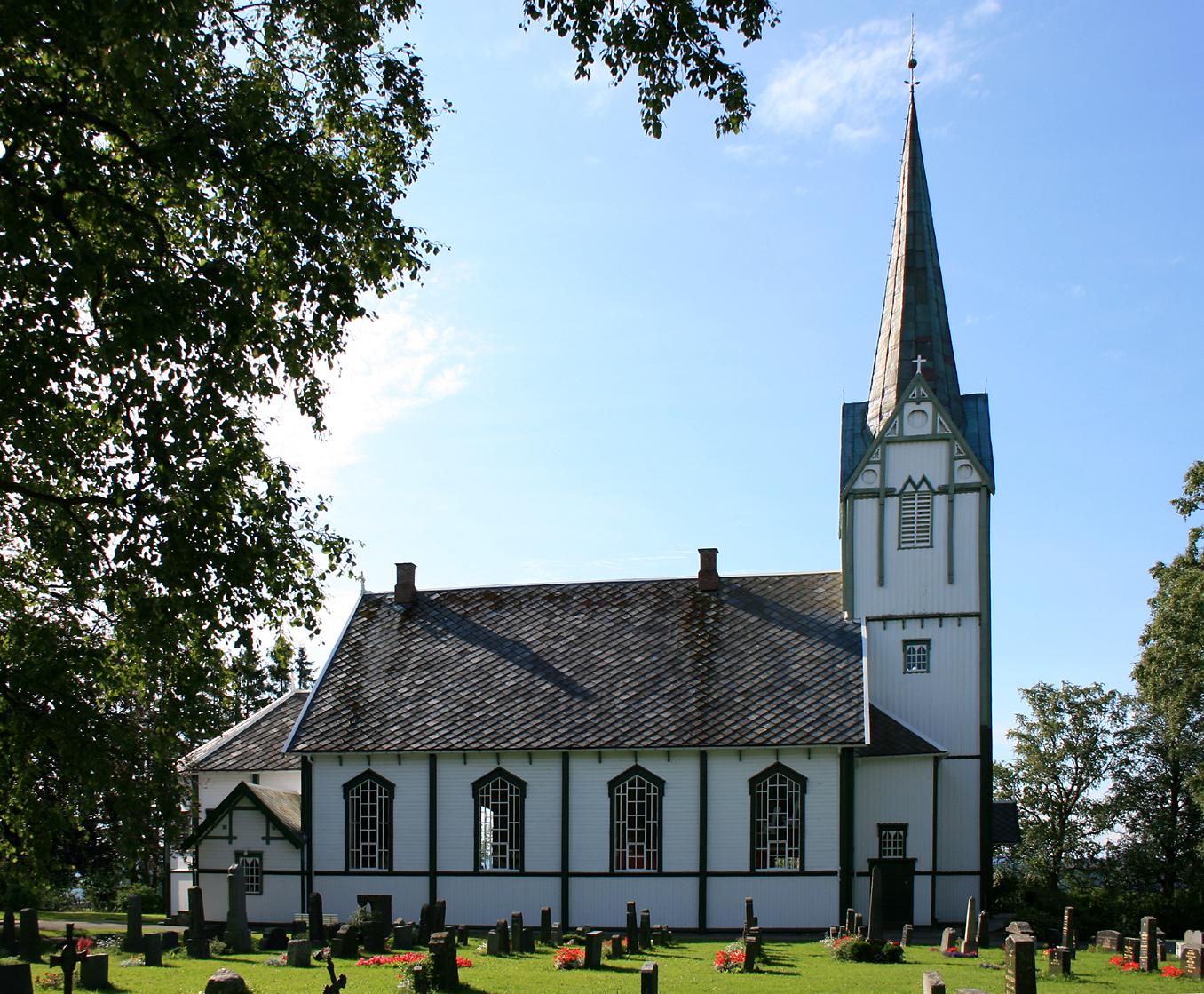
- View of the church
- Skatval Church
- 63.512051031°N 10.8615007997°E
- Location: Stjørdal Municipality, Trøndelag
- Country: Norway
- Denomination: Church of Norway
- Churchmanship: Evangelical Lutheran

History
- Status: Parish church
- Founded: Middle Ages
- Consecrated: 6 November 1901

Architecture
- Functional status: Active
- Architect: Johan Th. Wæhre
- Architectural type: Long church
- Style: Swiss chalet style
- Completed: 1901 (125 years ago)

Specifications
- Capacity: 440
- Materials: Wood

Administration
- Diocese: Nidaros bispedømme
- Deanery: Stjørdal prosti
- Parish: Skatval
- Norwegian Cultural Heritage Site
- Type: Church
- Status: Listed
- ID: 85447

Skatval Church (Norwegian: Skatval kirke) is a parish church of the Church of Norway in Stjørdal Municipality in Trøndelag county, Norway. It is located in the village of Skatval. It is the church for the Skatval parish which is part of the Stjørdal prosti (deanery) in the Diocese of Nidaros. The white, wooden church was built in a long church design and a Swiss chalet style in 1901 using plans drawn up by the architect Johan Wæhre. The church seats about 440 people.

== History ==
The historic Auran Church and Fløan Church both served the Skatval area for centuries before they were both closed in 1589 and the Skatval Church must have taken over for both of them. When the Skatval Church was established is unknown. The earliest existing historical records of this church date back to the year 1520, but the church was not new that year. The first church on this site may have been a stave church, but not much is known about it. From 1670-1692, the church was extensively rebuilt and enlarged. In 1767, the old church was torn down and replaced with a new church on a site about 40 metres (130 ft) northwest of the present-day church. This new church initially had a rectangular nave measuring 19.5 by 8.5 metres (64 ft × 28 ft) and a narrower, rectangular chancel that measured 7 by 5.6 metres (23 ft × 18 ft). In 1854, the church was enlarged by adding a north and south transept to create a cruciform floor plan. In 1901, the old church was torn down and replaced with a new long church on the present church site, about 40 metres (130 ft) southeast of the previous building. The new church was consecrate on 6 November 1901.

== Media gallery ==
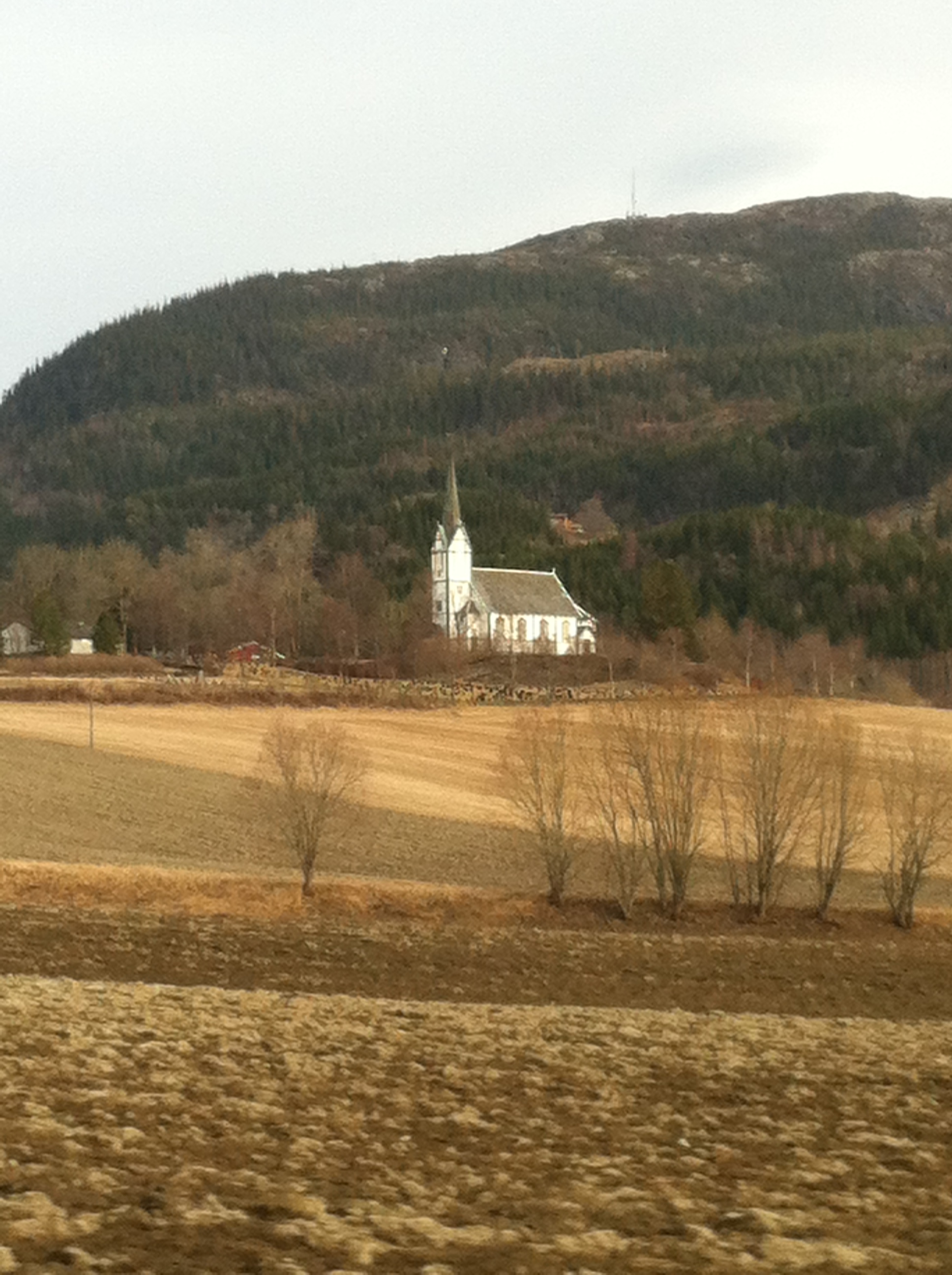
View of the church

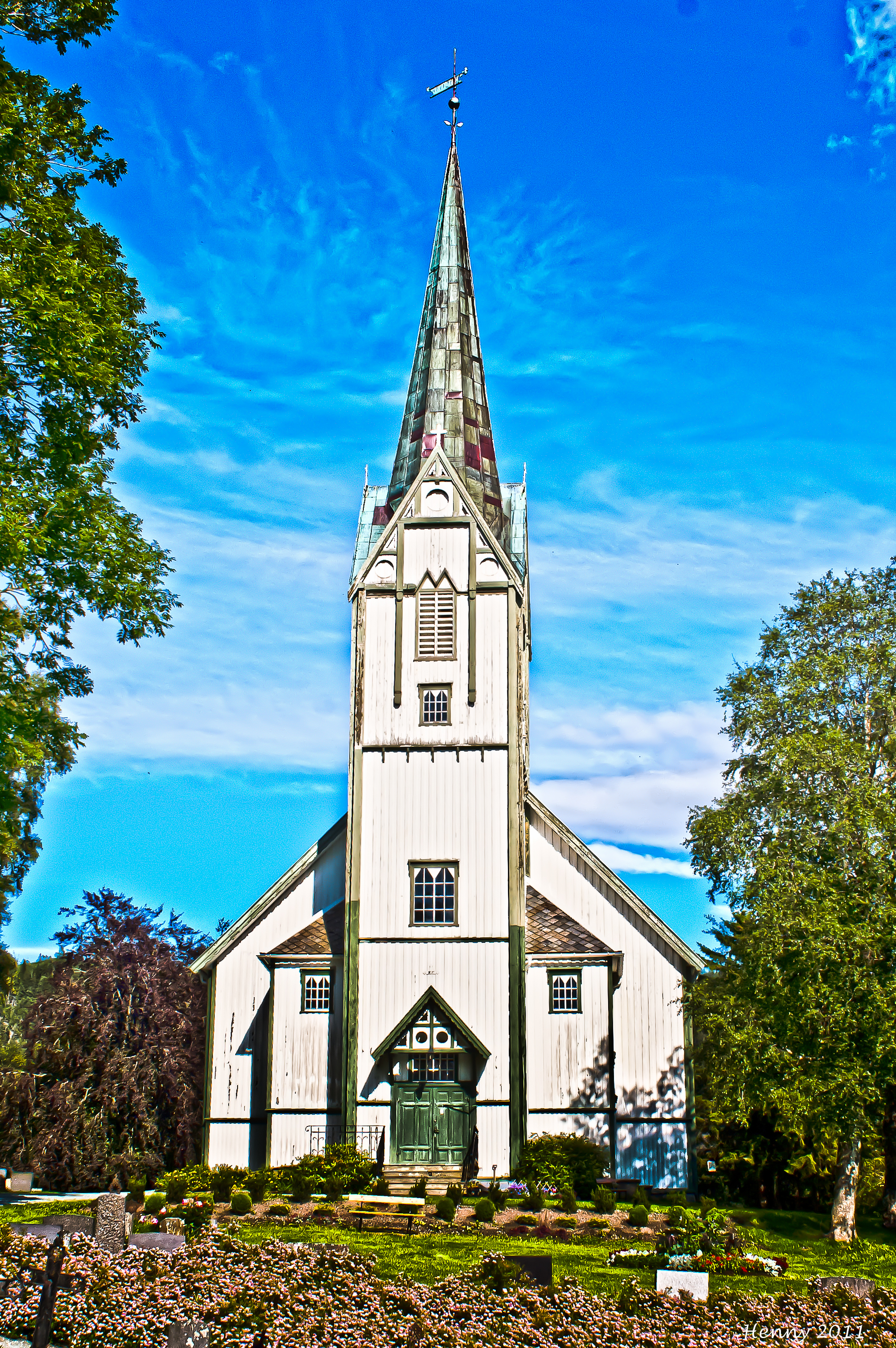
Exterior

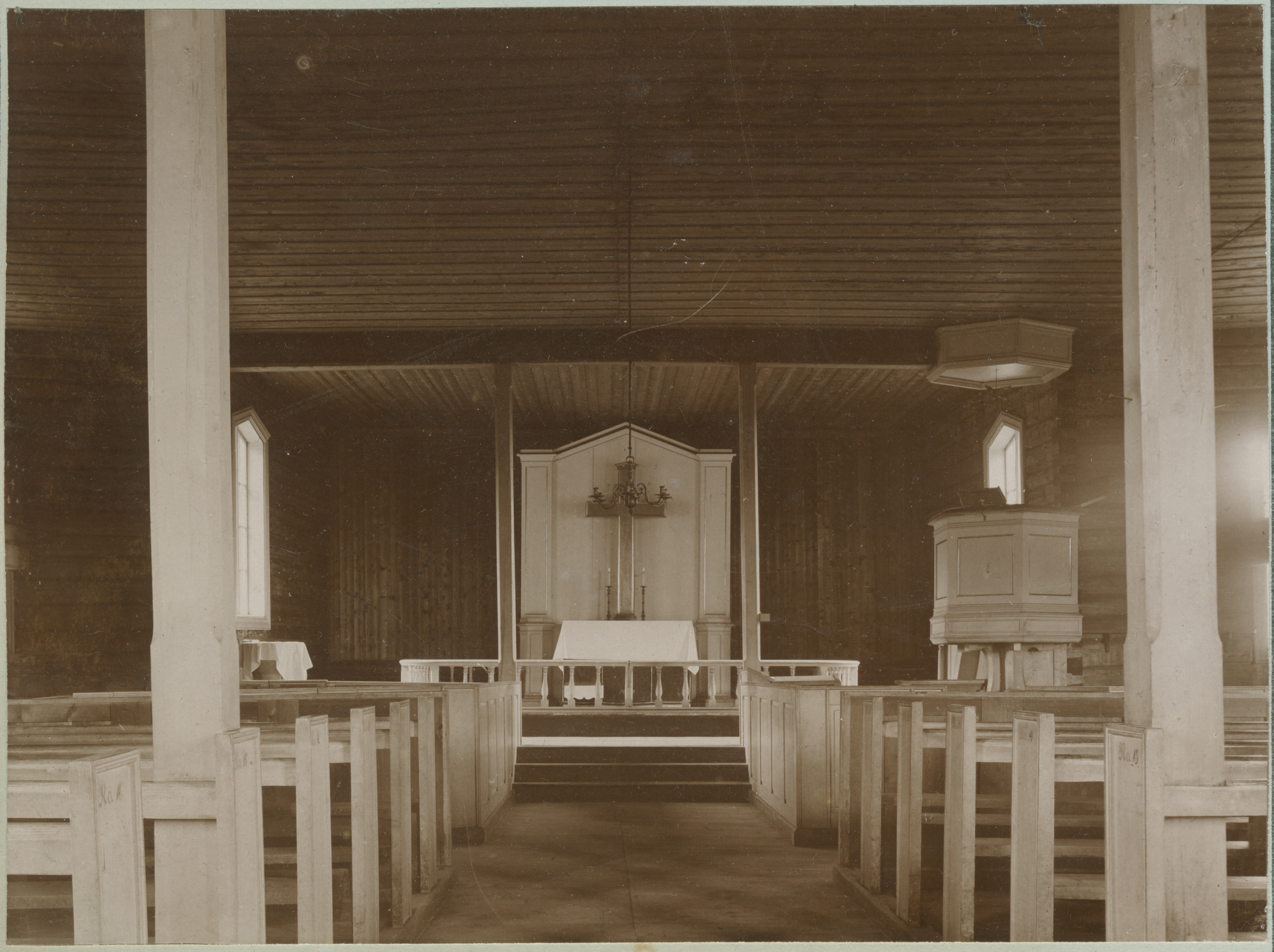
Interior

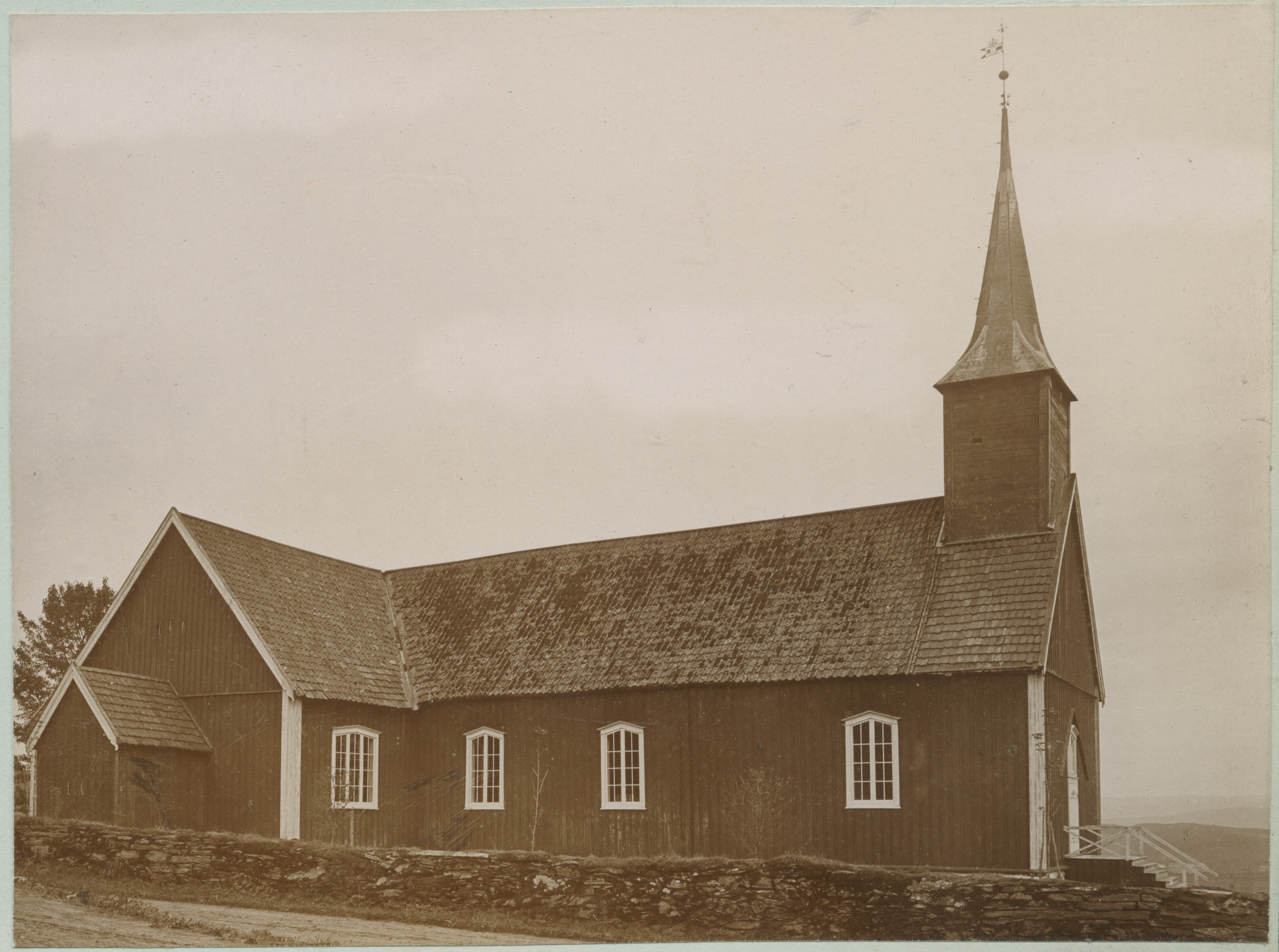
Old church from 1767-1900.

== See also ==
- List of churches in Nidaros
