= Elvran =

Village in Stjørdal Municipality, Norway

- Village
- Interactive map of Elvran
- Location within Trøndelag Location within Norway
- Coordinates: 63.3881°N 11.0735°E
- Country: Norway
- Region: Central Norway
- County: Trøndelag
- District: Stjørdalen
- Municipality: Stjørdal Municipality
- Elevation: 155 m (509 ft)
- Time zone: UTC+01:00 (CET)
  - Summer (DST): UTC+02:00 (CEST)
- Post Code: 7519 Elvarli

Elvran is a village in Stjørdal Municipality in Trøndelag county, Norway. It is located in the southern part of the municipality, about 15 kilometres (9.3 mi) southeast of the town of Stjørdalshalsen. The village is the location of Elvran Church.

== Notable people ==
- Jan Reinås (1944–2010), a Norwegian businessman
