= Lånke Church =

Church in Trøndelag, Norway

- Lånke kirke
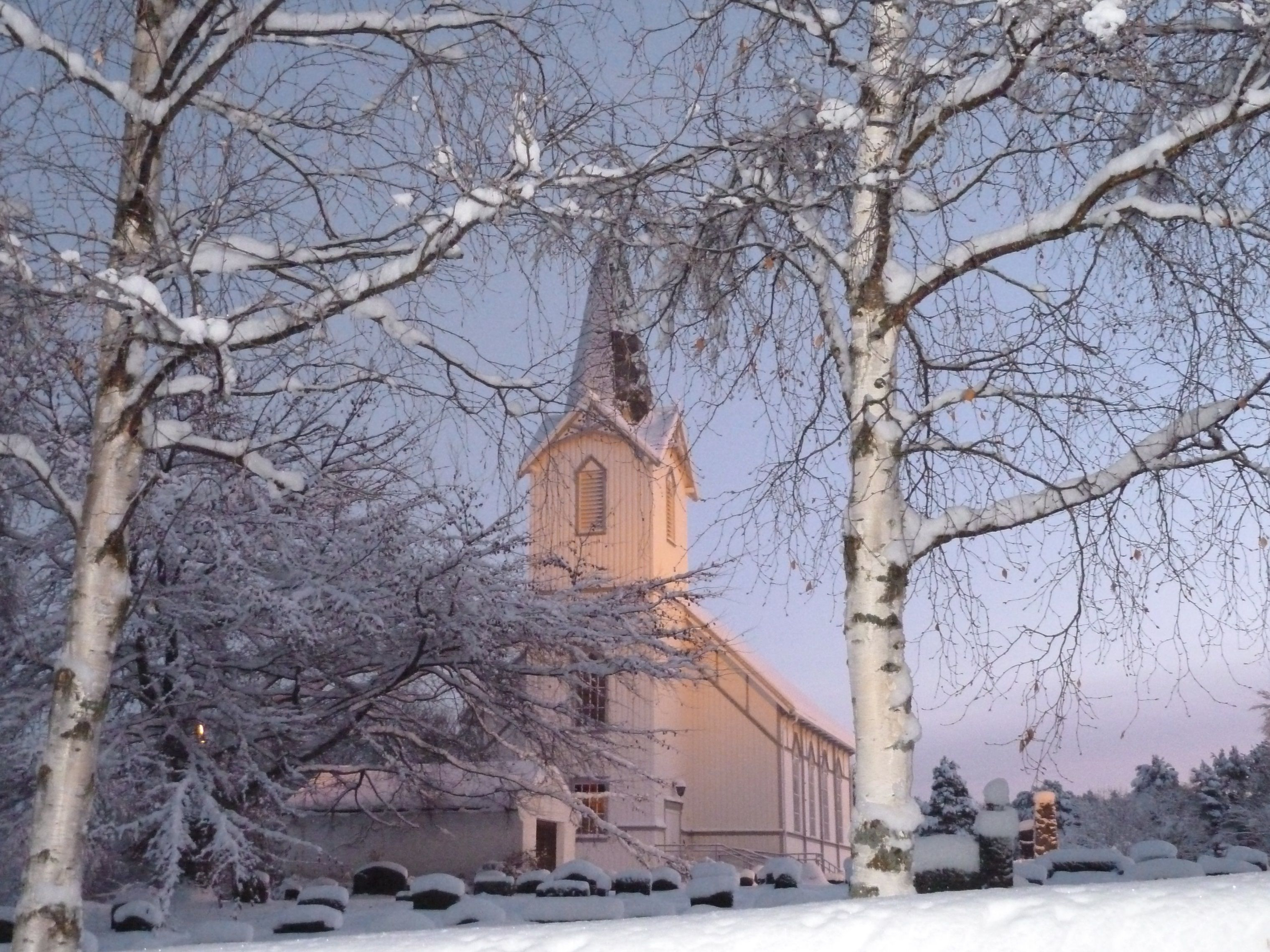
- View of the church
- Lånke Church
- 63.444752271°N 10.934175253°E
- Location: Stjørdal Municipality, Trøndelag
- Country: Norway
- Denomination: Church of Norway
- Churchmanship: Evangelical Lutheran

History
- Status: Parish church
- Founded: 14th century
- Consecrated: 13 Dec 1899

Architecture
- Functional status: Active
- Architect: Ole Røising
- Architectural type: Long church
- Completed: 1899 (127 years ago)

Specifications
- Capacity: 200
- Materials: Wood

Administration
- Diocese: Nidaros bispedømme
- Deanery: Stjørdal prosti
- Parish: Lånke
- Norwegian Cultural Heritage Site
- Type: Church
- Status: Not protected
- ID: 84370

Lånke Church (Norwegian: Lånke kirke) is a parish church of the Church of Norway in Stjørdal Municipality in Trøndelag county, Norway. It is located just east of the village of Hell. It is one of the churches for the Lånke parish which is part of the Stjørdal prosti (deanery) in the Diocese of Nidaros. The white, wooden church was built in a long church style in 1901 using plans drawn up by the architect Ole Røising. The church seats about 200 people.

== History ==
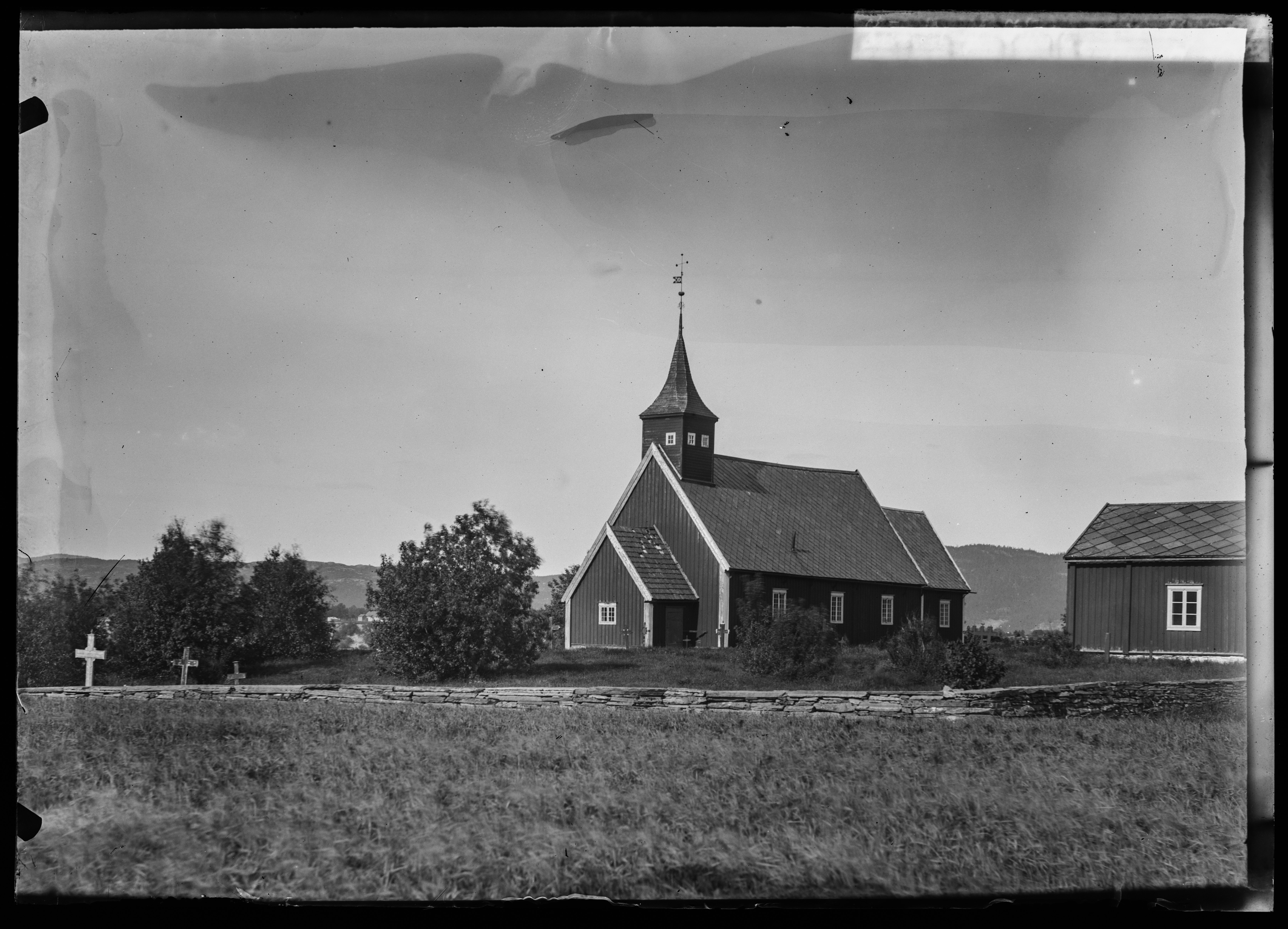
View of the old Lånke Church (before 1899)

The earliest existing historical records of the church date back to the year 1520, but the church was not new that year. Not much is known about the first church at Lånke, but it was located about 10 metres (33 ft) south of the present-day church and it was likely a stave church that may have been built in the 1300s. The old church was torn down and replaced with a new wooden long church during the first half of the 1600s. This new building was built about 20 metres (66 ft) to the north-northeast from the previous church site. The new church was described in 1774 as a "moderately large church with a spire" and later it was described as "a little, beautiful, red-painted long church".

The parish council met in 1897 to discuss the problems with the old building. During 1898, they decided to build a new church rather than try to renovated the old church. The last service in the old church was held on 12 March 1899, and not long after, the church was demolished and most of the furniture and interior decor was discarded. Soon after, a new church was constructed on roughly the same site. The new choir area was built slightly to the west of the previous church's choir and the new nave was built on land that was slightly west of the old church building. The new church was designed by Ole Røising (and the plans were corrected by the architecture consultant for the Ministry of Church Affairs), and the leader of the construction process was builder Edvard Leirtrø. The church was built during 1899 and it was consecrated on 13 December 1899. The church was restored in 1934 according to plans by John Egil Tverdahl.

== See also ==
- List of churches in Nidaros
