= Trondheim =

City in Norway

Trondheim Tråante
- City
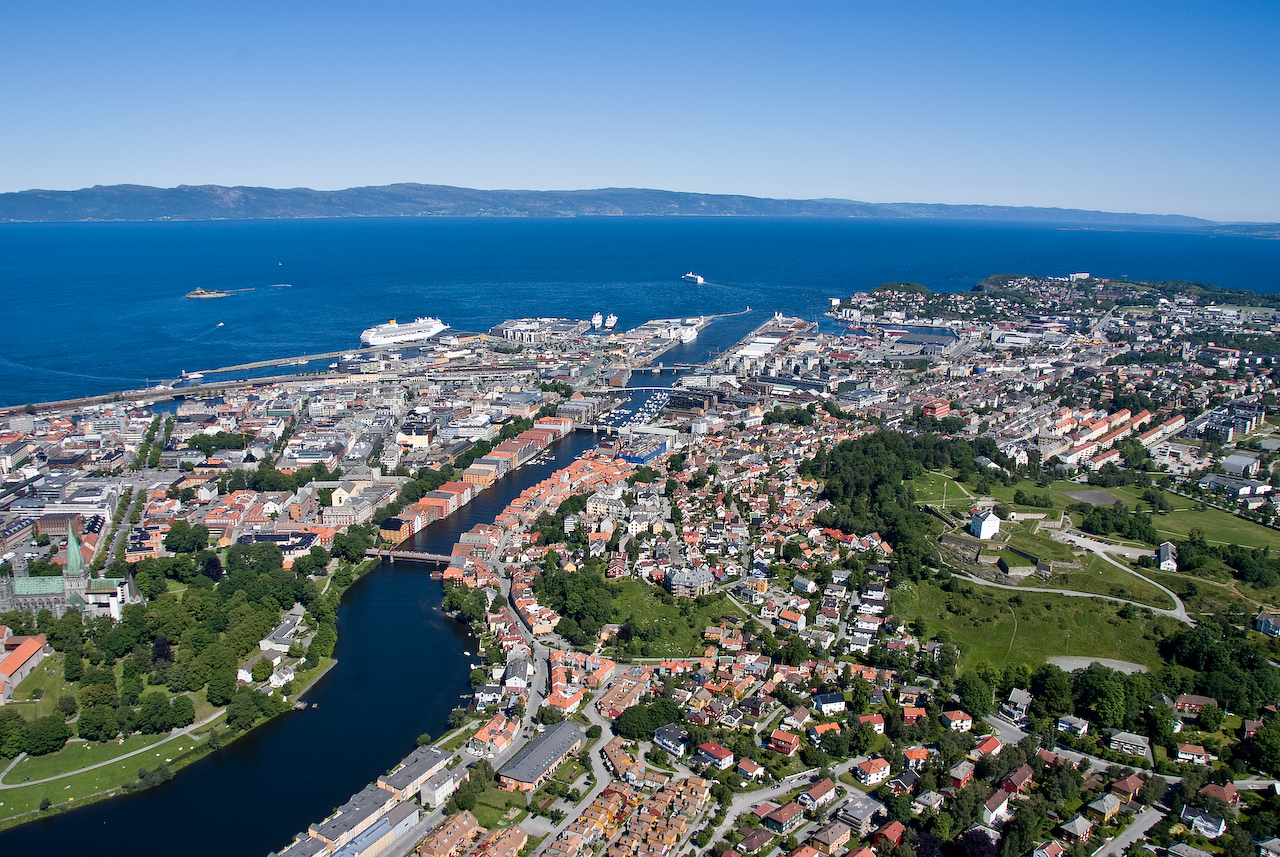
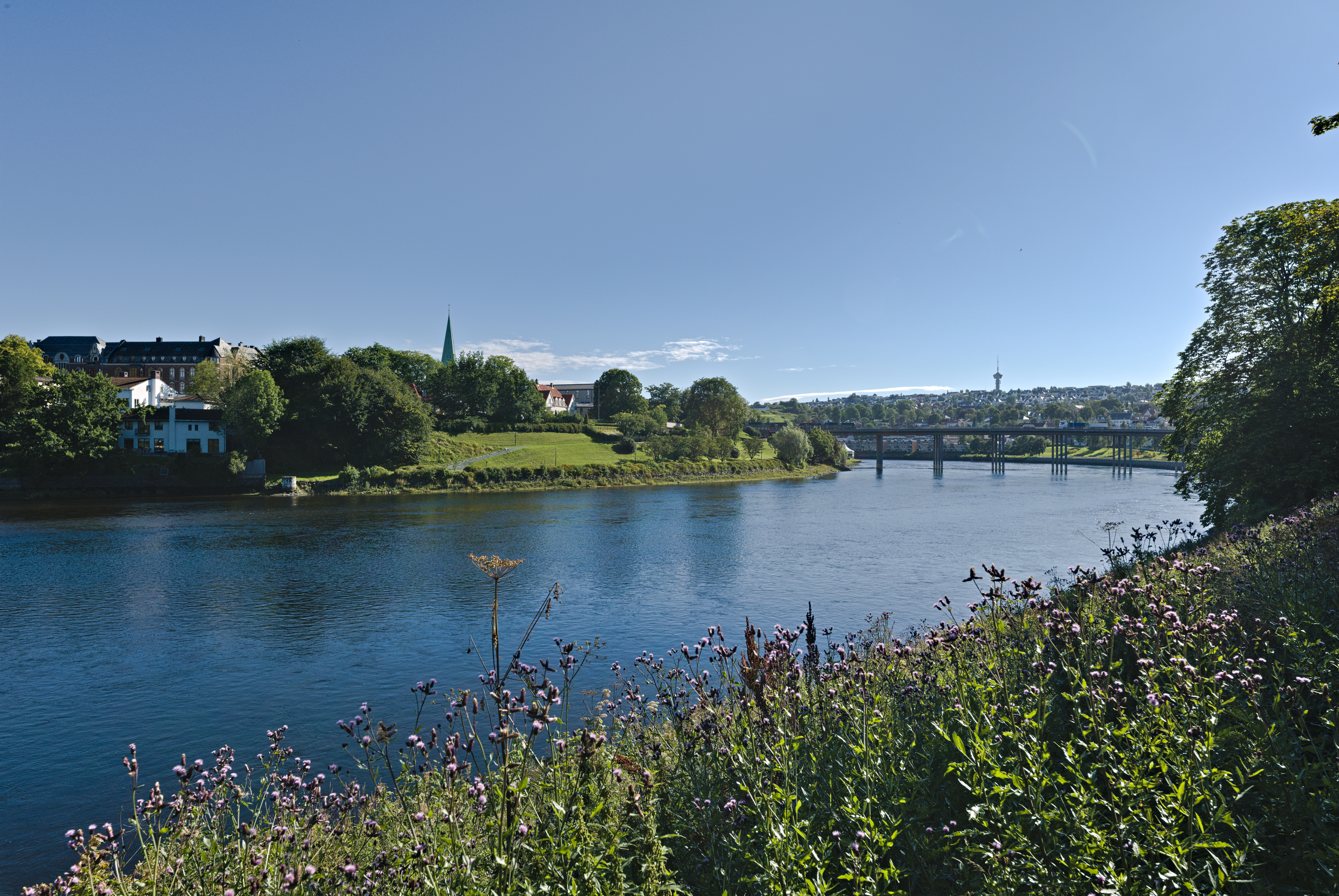
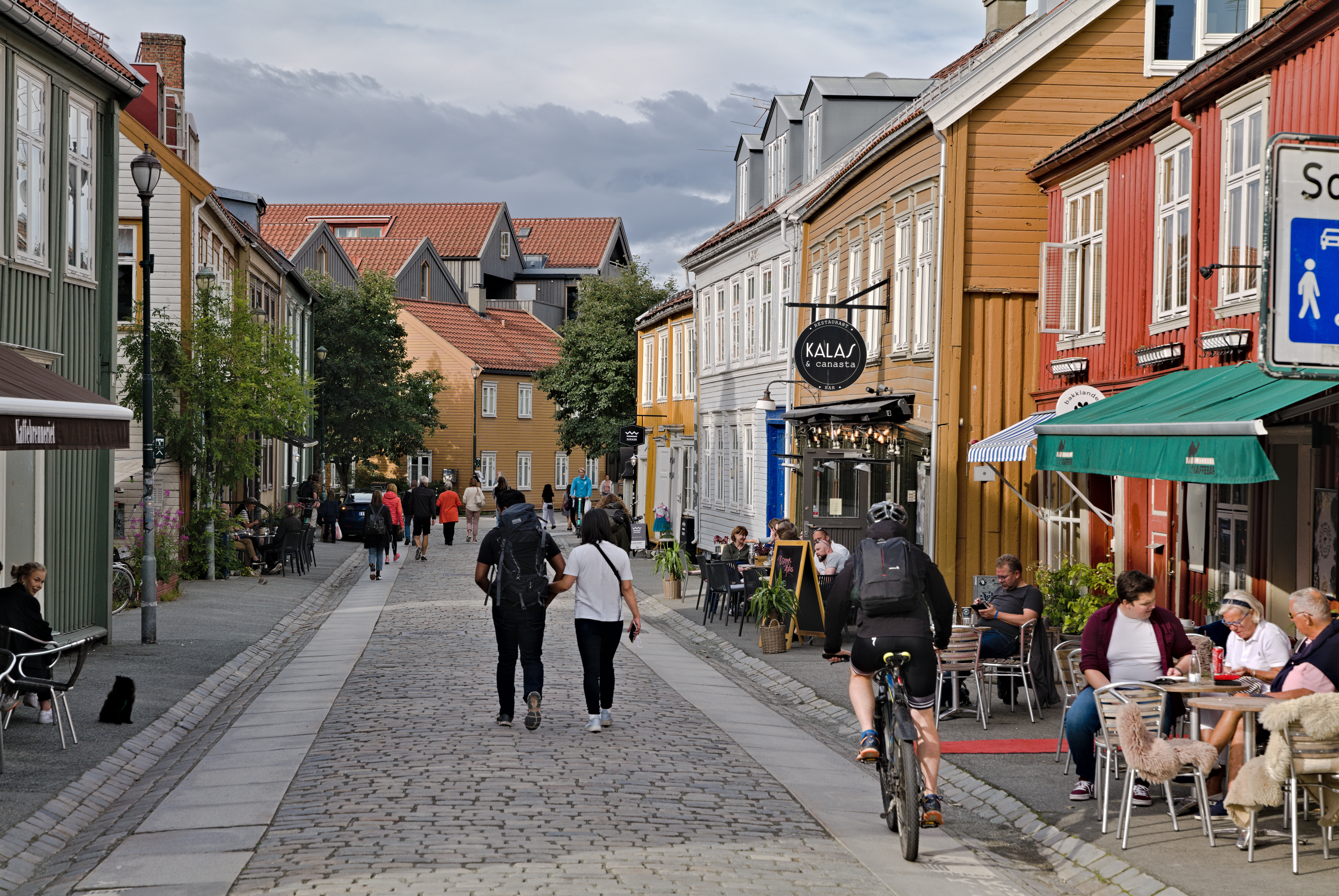
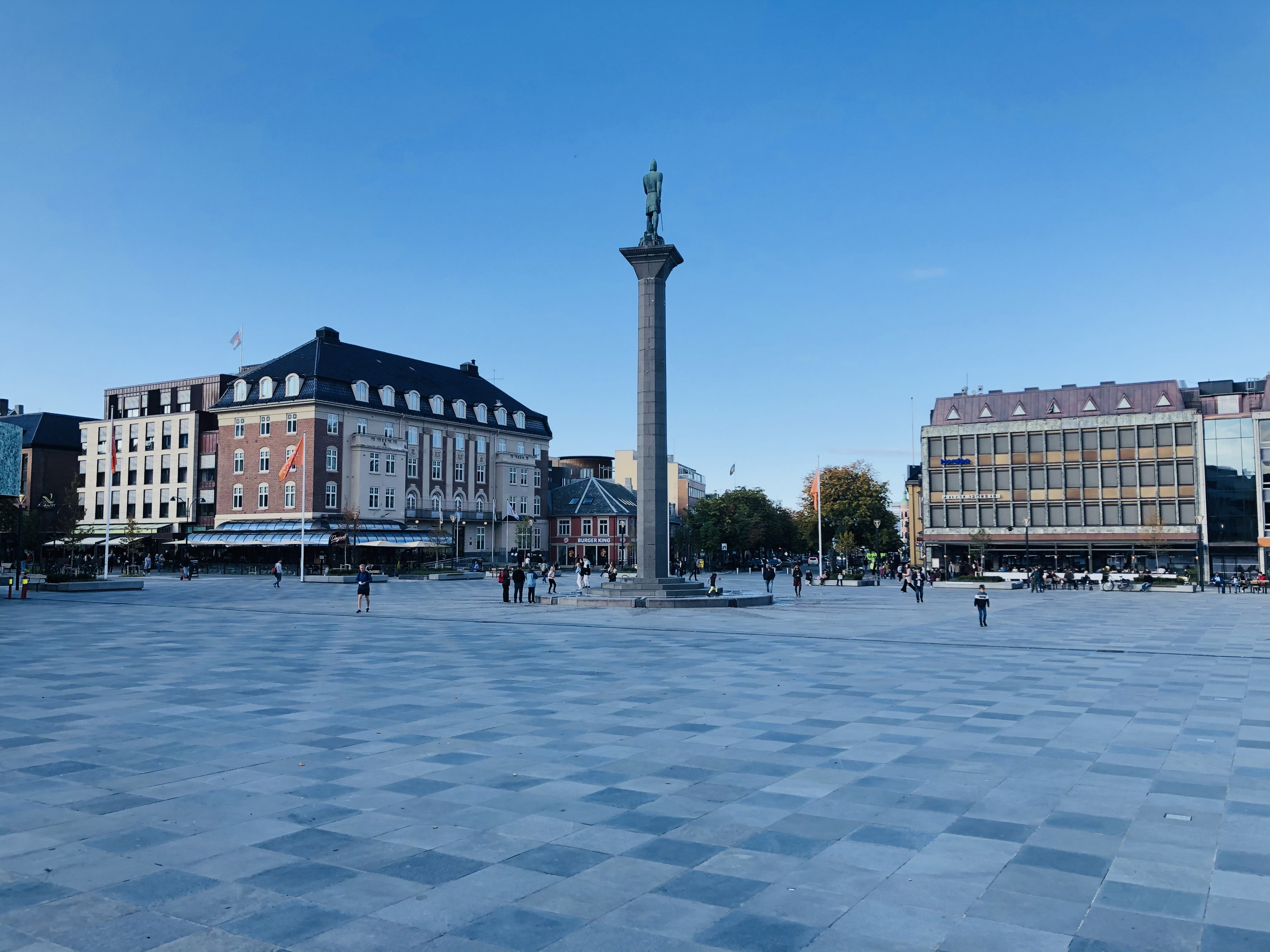
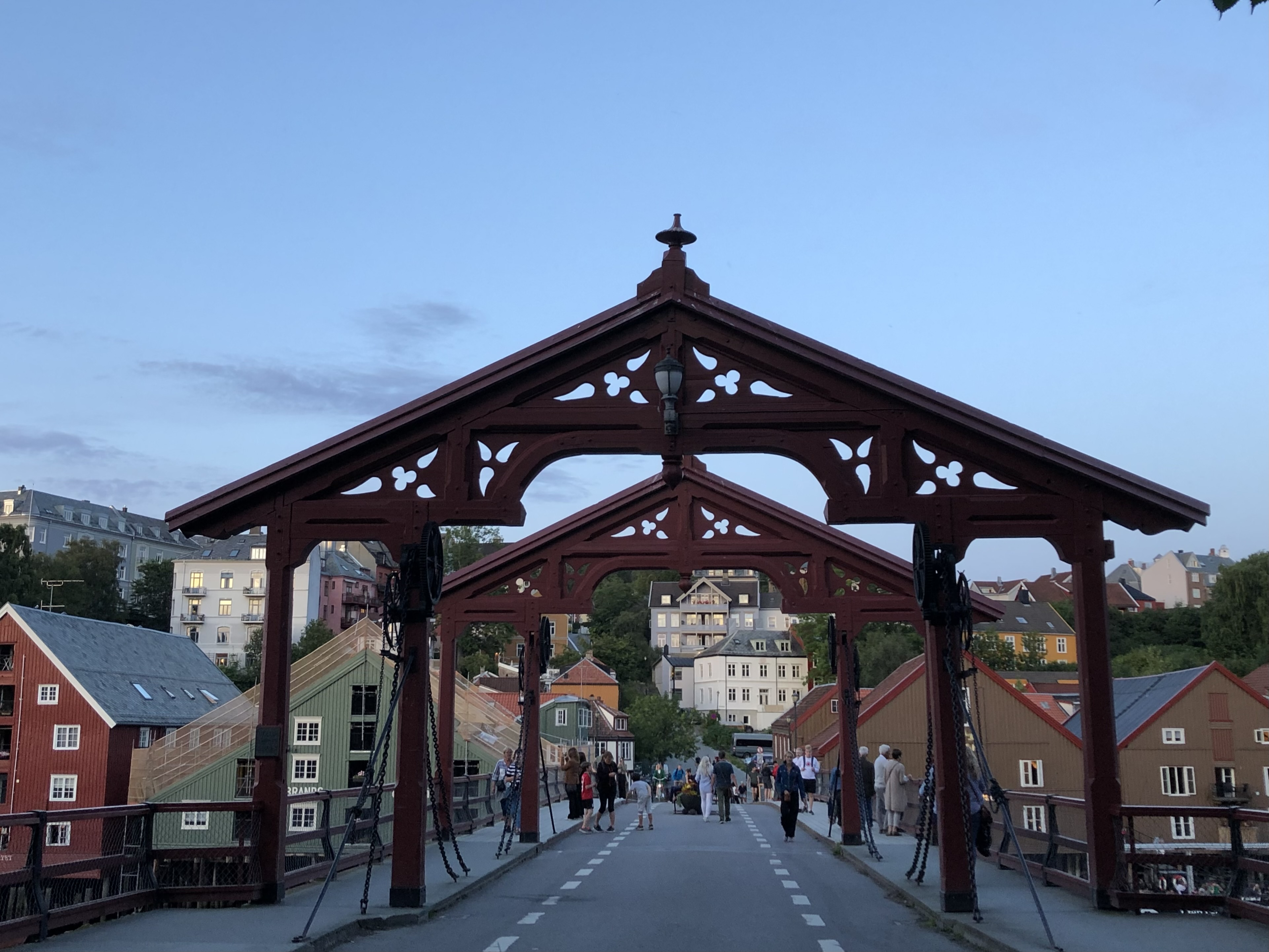
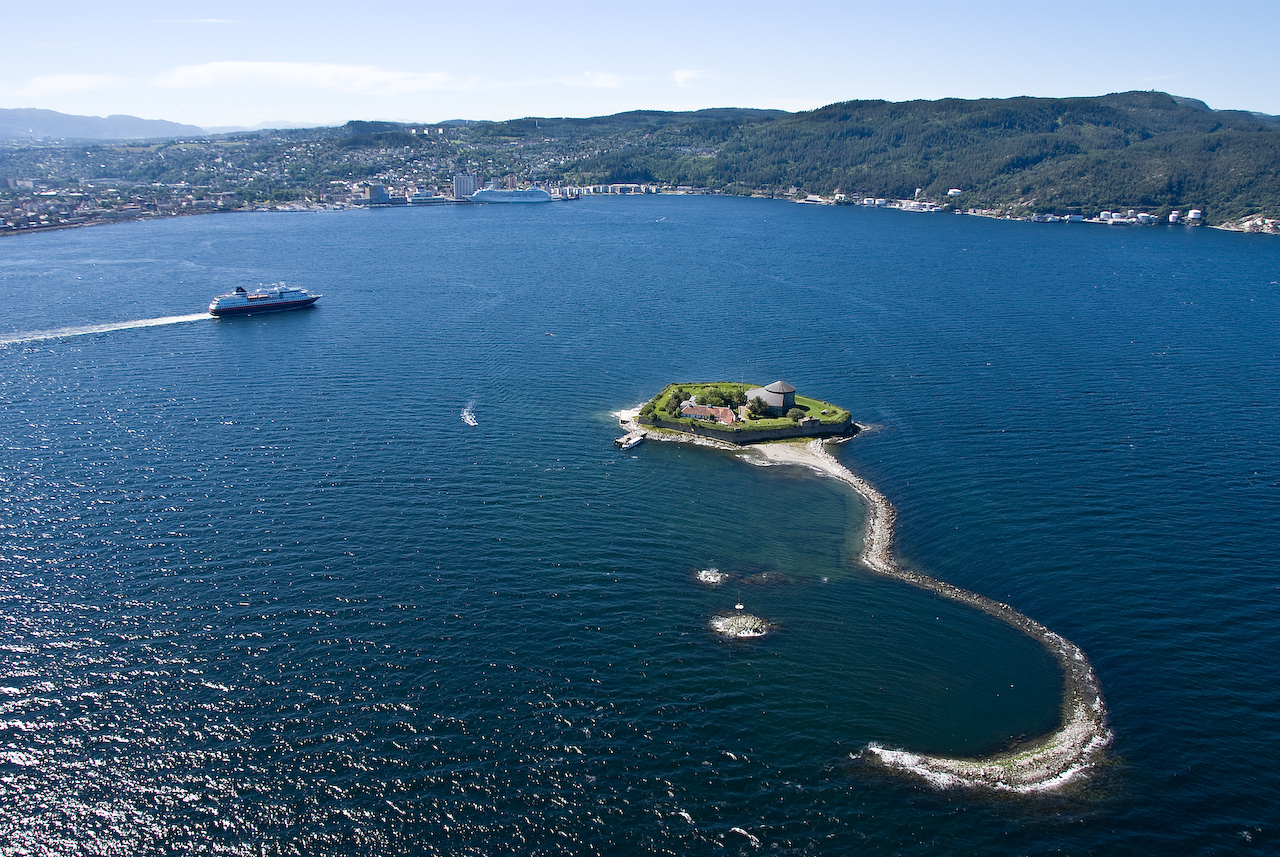
- From the top: Outer city with Nidelva and sea port, Nidelva seen from Øya, Bakklandet, The city's central square (Torvet), Old Town Bridge, Munkholmen seen from the air

- Flag Coat of arms
- Nickname: Stiftstaden (English: "The Diocese City")
- Location of the municipality

- Location within Trøndelag Location within Norway
- Coordinates: 63°25′47″N 10°23′36″E
- Country: Norway
- Municipality: Trondheim
- County: Trøndelag
- District: Trondheim Region
- Official language: Bokmål
- Established: 997

Government
  - Mayor: Kent Ranum (H)
  - Governing mayor: Kristian Dahlberg Hauge (H)

Area
  - City: 321.81 km^{2} (124.25 sq mi)
  - Urban: 342.30 km^{2} (132.16 sq mi)
  - Metro: 7,295 km^{2} (2,817 sq mi)

Population (1 January 2026)
  - City: 218,460
  - Density: 678.85/km^{2} (1,758.2/sq mi)
  - Urban: 186,364
  - Urban density: 544.45/km^{2} (1,410.1/sq mi)
  - Metro: 279,234
  - Metro density: 38.28/km^{2} (99.14/sq mi)
  - Municipality/Urban rank: 3rd/4th
  - Metro rank: 4th
- Demonym(s): Trondheimer, Trondhjemmer,

GDP
  - Metro: €26.143 billion (2021)
- Time zone: UTC+01:00 (CET)
  - Summer (DST): UTC+02:00 (CEST)
- Website: www.trondheim.kommune.no

Historical population
Year	Pop.	±%
1769	11,315	—
1951	56,582	+400.1%
1960	59,286	+4.8%
1970	126,190	+112.8%
1980	134,726	+6.8%
1990	137,346	+1.9%
2000	148,859	+8.4%
2010	171,540	+15.2%
2014	183,960	+7.2%
2022	211,106	+14.8%
Source: Statistics Norway

Trondheim (/ˈtrɒn(d)haɪm/ TRON(D)-hyme; Urban East Norwegian: [ˈtrɔ̂nː(h)æɪm]; Southern Sami: Tråante), historically Kaupangen, Nidaros, and Trondhjem (locally [ˈtrɔ̂nːjæm]), is a city and municipality in Trøndelag county, Norway. As of 1 January 2026, it had a population of 218,460. Trondheim is the third most populous municipality in Norway, and is the fourth largest urban area. Trondheim lies on the south shore of Trondheim Fjord at the mouth of the Nidelva. Among the significant technology-oriented institutions headquartered in Trondheim are the Norwegian University of Science and Technology (NTNU), the Foundation for Scientific and Industrial Research (SINTEF), the Geological Survey of Norway (NGU), and St. Olavs University Hospital.

The settlement was founded in 997 as a trading post and served as the capital of Norway through the Viking Age until 1217. From 1152 to 1537, the city was the seat of the Catholic Archdiocese of Nidaros; it then became, and has remained, the seat of the Lutheran Diocese of Nidaros and the site of the Nidaros Cathedral. The city was incorporated in 1838. The current municipality was formed in 1964, when Trondheim merged with Byneset Municipality, Leinstrand Municipality, Strinda Municipality, and Tiller Municipality, and further expanded on 1 January 2020, when Trondheim merged with Klæbu Municipality.

Trondheim has a mild climate for its northerly latitude, resulting in moderate summers and winters that often remain above the freezing point in seaside areas. At higher elevations, though, the microclimate is colder and snowier.

The city functions as the seat of the County Mayor of Trøndelag county but not as its administrative centre (which is Steinkjer). This is designed to avoid making the county administration too centralized.

Trondheim is home to football club Rosenborg, Norway's most successful football club, and Granåsen Ski Centre, which has hosted the World Championship in Nordic skiing.

== Names and etymology ==
The flag of Trondheim is one of the few Norwegian municipal flags that is not the banner of arms of the municipal coat of arms.

The city was established in 997 by Olav Tryggvason and it was originally named Nidaros (Old Norse: Niðaróss). The first element of the name was the local river Nid. The last element of the name was óss 'mouth (of a river)'. Thus the name meant 'the outlet of the river Nid'. Although the formal name was Nidaros, the city was commonly known as kaupangr 'city; marketplace', or more specifically kaupangr í Þróndheimi 'the city in Trondheim'. Trondheim (Old Norse: Þróndheimr) was the historic name for the whole district which is now known as Trøndelag. This is the area where the people were known as Trønder (þróndr). This district name Trondheim meant 'the home of the Trønder people' (lit. 'Trønder-home') and Trøndelag (Old Norse: Þrǿndalǫg) originally meant the 'law area of the Trønder people' (lit. 'Trønder-law'). The name of the Trønder people derives from the Old Norse word þróndr, an old present participle of the verb þróask 'to grow, thrive'.

During the late Middle Ages, the city name was commonly shortened to Þróndheimr, dropping the kaupanger part, and over time the name became Trondhjem, using the Dano-Norwegian spelling rather than the Old Norse spelling since the city was part of the Kingdom of Denmark-Norway for centuries.

On 21 December 1917, a royal resolution enacted the 1917 Norwegian language reforms. Around the time, many municipalities and cities had their names changed to "Norwegianize" the spelling and make them look less Danish. On 1 January 1919, the name of the local Church of Norway diocese was changed from Trondhjem stift to Nidaros bispedømme (English: Diocese of Nidaros). In 1924, the name of the Norwegian capital city was changed from Kristiania to Oslo, removing the name referencing a Danish King in favor of the very old name Oslo. In 1928, a referendum in Trondhjem was held on whether to keep the current name or to bring back the original name of Nidaros. The vote resulted in 17,163 votes in favour of Trondhjem and only 1,508 votes in favour of Nidaros. Despite this result, the Storting voted in 1929 to make some changes. The Trondhjem Cathedral would be changed to Nidaros Cathedral effective on 1 July 1929 and the name of the city would change to Nidaros starting on 1 January 1930. This change caused public outrage and even riots during 1930. This forced the Storting to reconsider this change. On 6 March 1931, the name was formally changed to Trondheim, using the medieval Norwegian spelling instead of the Danish version Trondhjem. The name of the diocese and cathedral, however, continued using the name Nidaros.

Trondheim was briefly named Drontheim during the Second World War as a German exonym.

== History ==
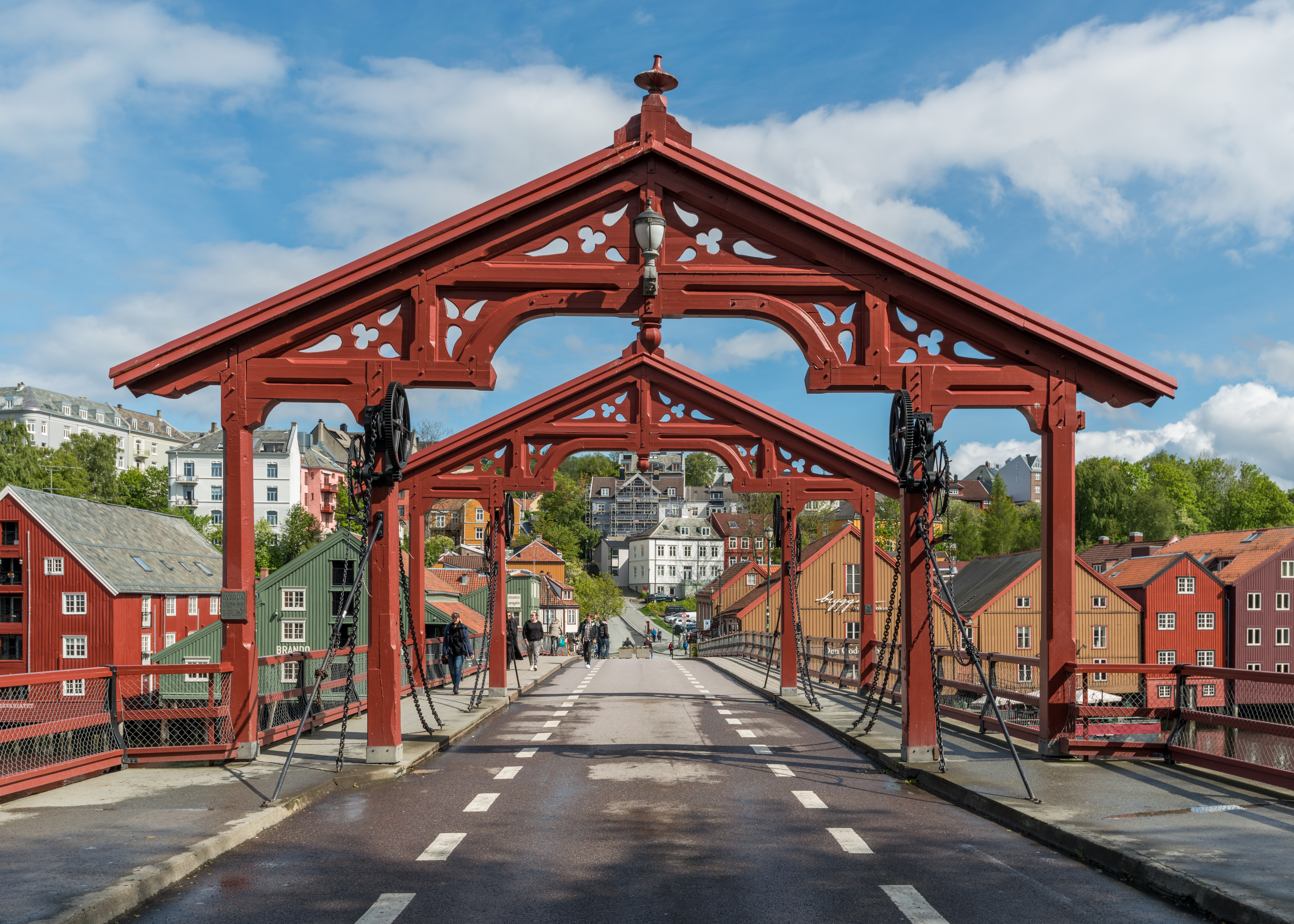
The Old Town Bridge of Trondheim

Trondheim was named Kaupangen (English: market place or trading place) by Viking King Olav Tryggvason in 997 CE. Shortly after that, it came to be called Nidaros. Initially, it was frequently used as a military retainer (Old Norse: "hird"-man) of King Olav I. It was also frequently used as the king's seat and was Norway's capital until 1217.

People have lived in the area for thousands of years, as evidenced by the rock carvings in central Norway, the Nøstvet and Lihult cultures, and the Corded Ware culture. In ancient times, the kings of Norway were hailed in Trondheim at Øretinget, the place for the assembly of all free men by the mouth of the River Nidelva. Harald Fairhair (865–933) was hailed as the king here, as was his son, Haakon I, called 'the Good.' The battle of Kalvskinnet took place in Trondheim in 1179: King Sverre Sigurdsson and his Birkebeiner warriors were victorious against Erling Skakke (a rival to the throne). Some scholars believe that the famous Lewis chessmen, 12th-century chess pieces carved from walrus ivory that were found in the Hebrides and are now at the British Museum, may have been made in Trondheim.

From 1152, Trondheim was the seat of the Archbishop of Nidaros for Norway, which operated from the Archbishop's Palace. Due to the introduction of Lutheran Protestantism in 1537, the last archbishop, Olav Engelbrektsson, had to flee from the city to the Netherlands; he died in what today is Lier, Belgium.

From the 16th through the 19th centuries, the city was repeatedly ravaged by fires that caused widespread damage since many of its buildings were made of wood. The worst occurred in 1598, 1651, 1681, 1708, 1717 (twice), 1742, 1788, 1841 and 1842. The 1651 fire destroyed 90% of all buildings within the city limits. After the "Horneman Fire" in 1681, there was an almost total reconstruction of the city, overseen by General Johan Caspar von Cicignon, originally from Luxembourg. Broad avenues, such as Munkegata, were created, without regard for private property rights, to limit the damage from future fires. At the time, the city had a population of under 10,000 inhabitants, with most living in the downtown area.

After the Treaty of Roskilde on 26 February 1658, Trondheim and the rest of Trøndelag became Swedish territory briefly. However, after a three-month long siege, the area was reconquered 10 months later. The conflict was finally settled by the Treaty of Copenhagen on 27 May 1660.

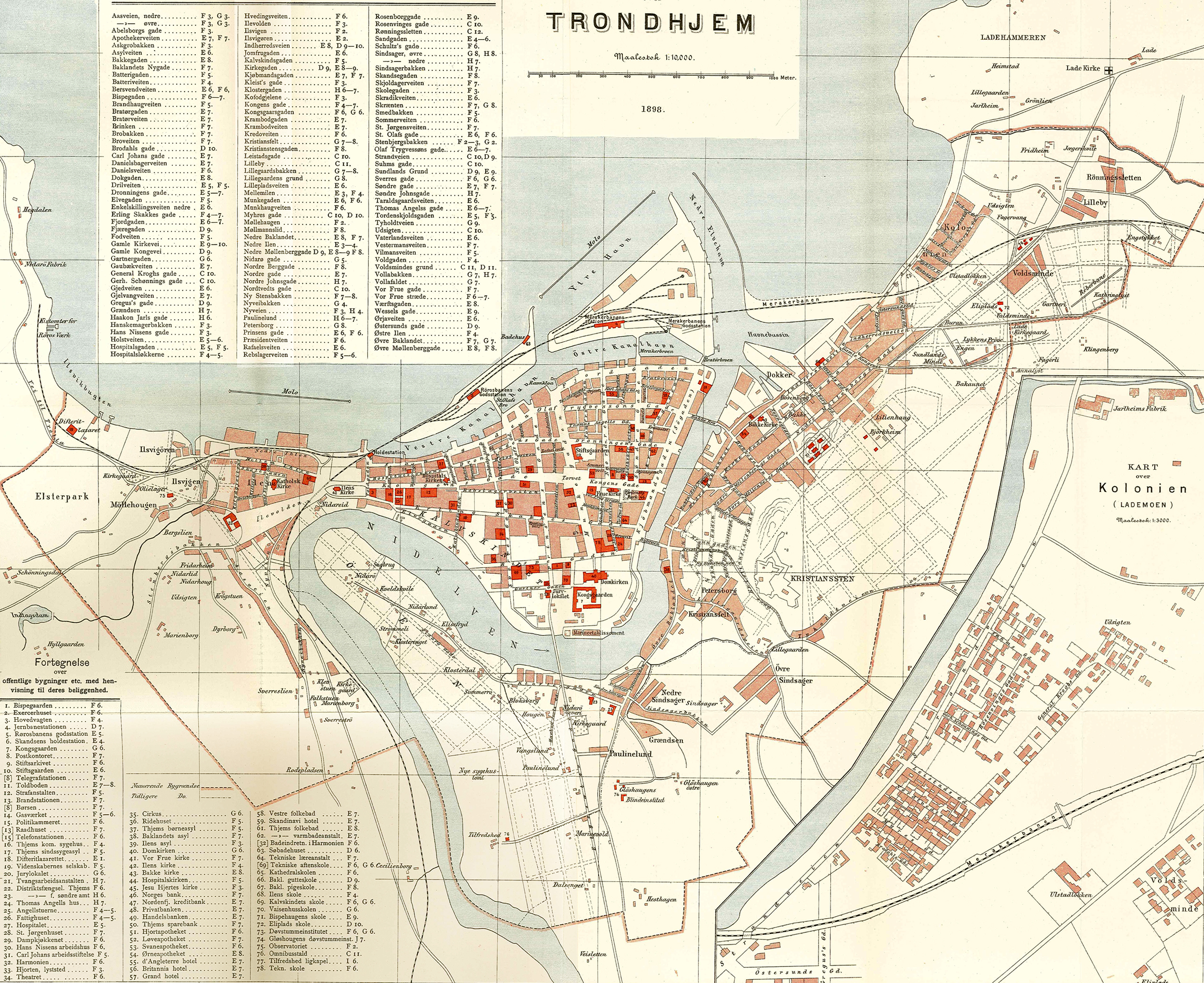
City Map of Trondheim in 1898, Norwegian edition

Plan of Trondheim, 1942

During the Second World War, Trondheim was occupied by Nazi Germany from 9 April 1940, the first day of the invasion of Norway, until the end of the war in Europe, 8 May 1945. The German invasion force consisted of the German cruiser Admiral Hipper, 4 destroyers and 1700 Austrian Mountain troops. Except for a coastal battery that opened fire, there was no resistance to the invasion, which began on 9 April at 5 AM. On 14 and 17 April, British and French forces landed near Trondheim in a failed attempt to liberate Trondheim, as part of the Namsos Campaign. During the occupation, Trondheim was the home of the notorious Norwegian Gestapo agent, Henry Rinnan, who operated from a nearby villa and infiltrated Norwegian resistance groups. The city and its citizens were subjected to harsh treatment by the occupying power, including the imposition of martial law in October 1942. During this time, the Germans turned the city and its environs into a major base for submarines (which included building the large submarine base and bunker DORA I), and contemplated a scheme to build a new city for 300,000 inhabitants, Nordstern ("Northern Star"), centred 15 kilometres (9 miles) southwest of Trondheim, near the wetlands of Øysand on the outskirts of Melhus municipality. This new metropolis was to be accompanied by a massively expanded version of the already existing naval base, which was intended to become the future primary stronghold of the German Kriegsmarine. A start was made on this enormous construction project, but it was far from completed when the war ended, and today, there are few physical remains of it.

=== Municipal history ===
The city of Trondheim was established on 1 January 1838 (see formannskapsdistrikt law). On 1 January 1864, part of Strinda Municipality (population: 1,229) was amalgamated with Trondheim. Then, on 1 January 1893, another part of Strinda Municipality (population: 4,097) was transferred to Trondheim Municipality. On 1 January 1952, the Lade area of Strinda Municipality (population: 2,230) was transferred to Trondheim Municipality. On 1 January 1964, a major municipal merger took place: Leinstrand Municipality (population: 4,193), Byneset Municipality (population: 2,049), Strinda Municipality (population: 44,600), and Tiller Municipality (population: 3,595) were all merged with the city of Trondheim (population: 56,982), which nearly doubled the population of the municipality. On 1 January 2020, the neighboring Klæbu Municipality (population: 6,050) was merged with Trondheim Municipality.

=== Coat of arms and seal ===
The coat of arms dates back to the 13th century. To the left, there is an archbishop with his staff and mitre in a church archway. On the right, a crowned king holding scales in a castle archway. These two pictures rest on a base which forms an arch. Underneath that arch, are three male heads which symbolise the city's rank as Norway's first capital and the archbishop's place of residence. The scales symbolise justice and the motif is based on the political philosophy of the 13th century, where the balance of power between king and church was an important issue. The three heads at the bottom may symbolise the city council. The motif is unique in Norwegian municipal heraldry, but similar motifs are found in bishopric cities on the continent. The design of the coat-of-arms that was adopted in 1897, and is still used today, was made by Håkon Thorsen.

== Geography ==
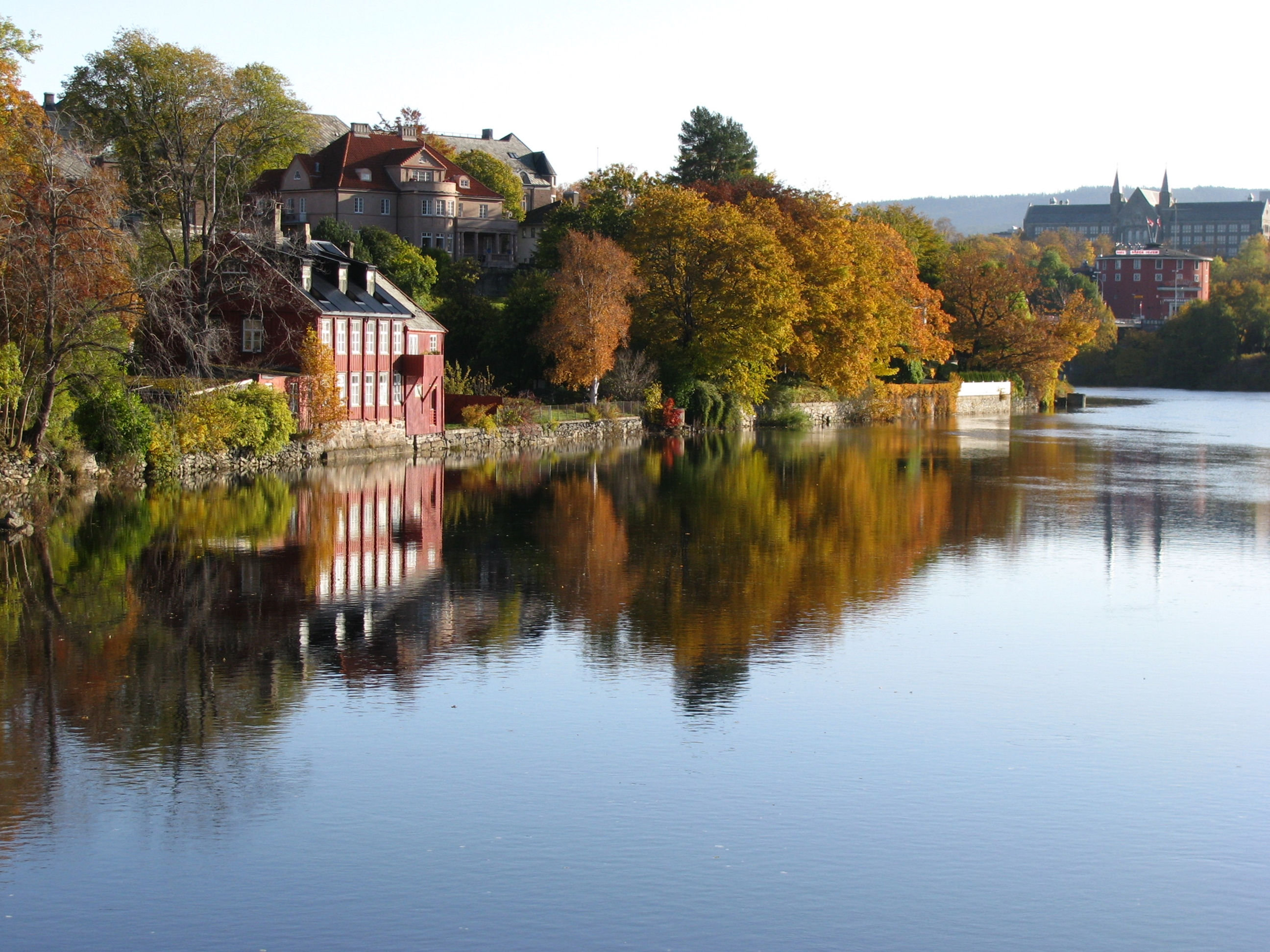
Autumn foliage along Nidelva; October 2009

Trondheim is situated where the River Nidelva meets Trondheim Fjord with an excellent harbour and sheltered condition. In the Middle Ages the river was deep enough to be navigable by most boats. However, in the mid–17th century, an avalanche of mud and stones made it less navigable, and partly ruined the harbour. The municipality's highest elevation is the Storheia hill, 565 metres (1,854 ft) above sea level. At the summer solstice, the sun rises at 03:00 and sets at 23:40, and then stays just below the horizon. Between 23 May and 19 July, when the sky is cloud-free, it remains light enough at night that no artificial lighting is needed outdoors. At the winter solstice, the sun rises at 10:01, stays very low above the horizon (at midday its altitude is slightly more than 3 degrees over the horizon), and sets at 14:31.

=== Climate ===
Trondheim city has an oceanic climate (Cfb) or humid continental climate (Dfb), depending on the winter threshold used (−3°C or 0°C) and the location within the city. Winters are fairly cold and summers are mild. The part of the municipality further away from the fjord has slightly colder winters, while the part close to the fjord has the mildest winters. Trondheim is mostly sheltered from the strong south and southwesterly winds which can occur along the outer seaboard but is more exposed to northwesterly winds. As with the rest of Norway, the weather is dependent on the weather pattern. High pressure over Central Norway or to the east can last for weeks, while Atlantic Lows from the west also can dominate for weeks. Such stuck opposite weather patterns was evident in 2020, when May saw northwesterlies with cold air even bringing some snowfall, while the following June was warm and sunny. Trondheim experiences moderate snowfall from November to March, but mixed with mild weather and rainfall. There is often more snow and later snowmelt in suburban areas at a higher elevation, with good skiing conditions in Bymarka. All the monthly record lows are from 1955 or older, with half of them from before 1920. The last overnight frost in June was in 1958. The all-time low −26 °C (−14.8 °F) was recorded February 1899. The all-time high 35 °C (95 °F) was recorded 22 July 1901. The earliest weather stations were located closer to the city centre, from 1945 onwards the weather station has been located at a higher elevation (Voll, 127 m and Tyholt, 113 m), therefore being slightly colder. A new sunrecorder was established in the city by met.no at Gløshaugen (NTNU campus) December 2015, recording more sunhours than the earlier sunrecorder, which had terrain blocking issues. Trondheim recorded 197 sunhours in October 2016 beating the previous national record for October. In April 2019 Trondheim recorded 308 sunhours, new national record for April. In contrast, December 2016 only recorded 10 sunhours.

Located at 63 degrees north, Trondheim experience "white nights" with only civil twilight during the height of summer. This light allow for normal daytime activities at night, such as reading a book.

Climate data for Trondheim - Voll 1991–2020 (127 m, avg high/low 2002-2025, extremes 1870–present includes earlier stations, sunhrs 2016–2024 Gløshaugen/met.no)
Month	Jan	Feb	Mar	Apr	May	Jun	Jul	Aug	Sep	Oct	Nov	Dec	Year
Record high °C (°F)	13.5 (56.3)	12.6 (54.7)	14.6 (58.3)	22.0 (71.6)	28.9 (84.0)	31.2 (88.2)	35.0 (95.0)	30.4 (86.7)	26.0 (78.8)	21.8 (71.2)	15.4 (59.7)	13.2 (55.8)	35.0 (95.0)
Mean daily maximum °C (°F)	1.2 (34.2)	1.9 (35.4)	4.6 (40.3)	8.9 (48.0)	13.7 (56.7)	17.1 (62.8)	19.9 (67.8)	18.7 (65.7)	14.5 (58.1)	8.9 (48.0)	4.5 (40.1)	2.1 (35.8)	9.7 (49.4)
Daily mean °C (°F)	−1 (30)	−1.2 (29.8)	0.7 (33.3)	4.6 (40.3)	8.5 (47.3)	11.8 (53.2)	14.8 (58.6)	14.1 (57.4)	10.6 (51.1)	5.5 (41.9)	2.1 (35.8)	−0.9 (30.4)	5.8 (42.4)
Mean daily minimum °C (°F)	−4.1 (24.6)	−3.6 (25.5)	−1.9 (28.6)	1.4 (34.5)	5.4 (41.7)	9 (48)	11.6 (52.9)	10.9 (51.6)	7.8 (46.0)	3.3 (37.9)	−0.6 (30.9)	−3.2 (26.2)	3.0 (37.4)
Record low °C (°F)	−25.0 (−13.0)	−26.0 (−14.8)	−22.7 (−8.9)	−15.3 (4.5)	−9.6 (14.7)	−0.8 (30.6)	0.6 (33.1)	1.0 (33.8)	−3.5 (25.7)	−12.6 (9.3)	−18.7 (−1.7)	−24.0 (−11.2)	−26.0 (−14.8)
Average precipitation mm (inches)	81 (3.2)	73 (2.9)	69 (2.7)	49 (1.9)	50 (2.0)	72 (2.8)	70 (2.8)	84 (3.3)	90 (3.5)	80 (3.1)	72 (2.8)	81 (3.2)	871 (34.2)
Mean monthly sunshine hours	35.2	70.9	133.3	206.0	249.7	234.4	213.5	168.1	132.7	97.6	49.1	22.1	1,612.6
Source 1: eklima.met.no
Source 2: Seklima

Climate data for Trondheim - Voll 1981–2010 (127 m, extremes 1870–present includes earlier stations)
Month	Jan	Feb	Mar	Apr	May	Jun	Jul	Aug	Sep	Oct	Nov	Dec	Year
Record high °C (°F)	13.5 (56.3)	12.6 (54.7)	14.6 (58.3)	22.0 (71.6)	28.9 (84.0)	31.2 (88.2)	35.0 (95.0)	30.4 (86.7)	26.0 (78.8)	21.8 (71.2)	15.4 (59.7)	13.2 (55.8)	35.0 (95.0)
Mean daily maximum °C (°F)	1.2 (34.2)	1.8 (35.2)	4.2 (39.6)	8.8 (47.8)	13.7 (56.7)	16.3 (61.3)	19.0 (66.2)	18.0 (64.4)	14.6 (58.3)	8.9 (48.0)	4.7 (40.5)	2.1 (35.8)	9.4 (49.0)
Daily mean °C (°F)	−1.3 (29.7)	−1.1 (30.0)	0.7 (33.3)	4.8 (40.6)	9.1 (48.4)	12.1 (53.8)	15.0 (59.0)	14.2 (57.6)	10.6 (51.1)	5.9 (42.6)	2.0 (35.6)	−0.8 (30.6)	5.9 (42.7)
Mean daily minimum °C (°F)	−4.0 (24.8)	−3.7 (25.3)	−2.2 (28.0)	1.5 (34.7)	5.3 (41.5)	8.5 (47.3)	11.4 (52.5)	10.8 (51.4)	7.9 (46.2)	3.0 (37.4)	−0.5 (31.1)	−3.3 (26.1)	2.9 (37.2)
Record low °C (°F)	−25.0 (−13.0)	−26.0 (−14.8)	−22.7 (−8.9)	−15.3 (4.5)	−9.6 (14.7)	−0.8 (30.6)	0.6 (33.1)	1.0 (33.8)	−3.5 (25.7)	−12.6 (9.3)	−18.7 (−1.7)	−24.0 (−11.2)	−26.0 (−14.8)
Average precipitation mm (inches)	72.6 (2.86)	67.9 (2.67)	72.2 (2.84)	51.5 (2.03)	43.4 (1.71)	70.8 (2.79)	75.6 (2.98)	79.6 (3.13)	84.2 (3.31)	78.4 (3.09)	66.8 (2.63)	78.1 (3.07)	841.1 (33.11)
Average precipitation days (≥ 1.0 mm)	13	12	13	12	10	13	11	12	12	14	12	13	147
Source 1: eklima.met.no
Source 2: Meteo-climat

=== Fauna ===
The city has various wetland habitats. among which there is the Gaulosen. The observation tower accommodates for birdwatching and providing information about birdlife.

Though Trondheim is Norway's third largest city, wild animals are regularly seen. Otters and beavers thrive in Nidelva and Bymarka. Badgers and red foxes are not uncommon sights. Moose and deer are common in the hills surrounding the city, and might wander into the city, especially in May when the one-year-olds are chased away by their mothers, or in late winter when food grows scarce in the snow-covered higher regions. From 2002 until 2017, a wolverine lived in Bymarka.

== Cityscape and sites ==
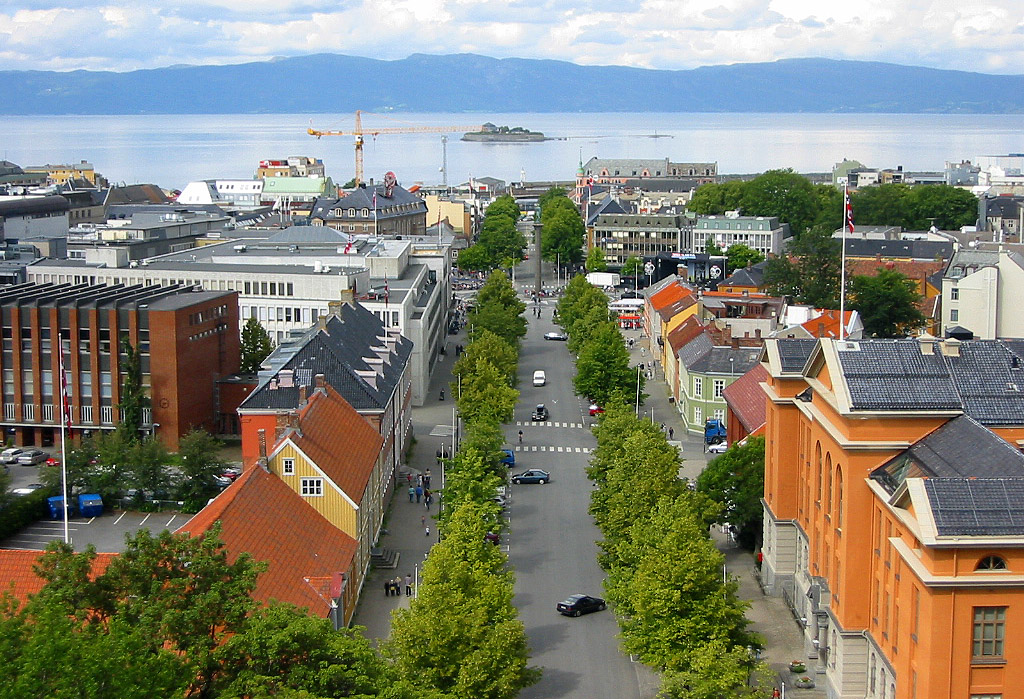
Central Trondheim as seen from the tower of the Nidaros Cathedral looking towards Trondheim Fjord and Munkholmen Island

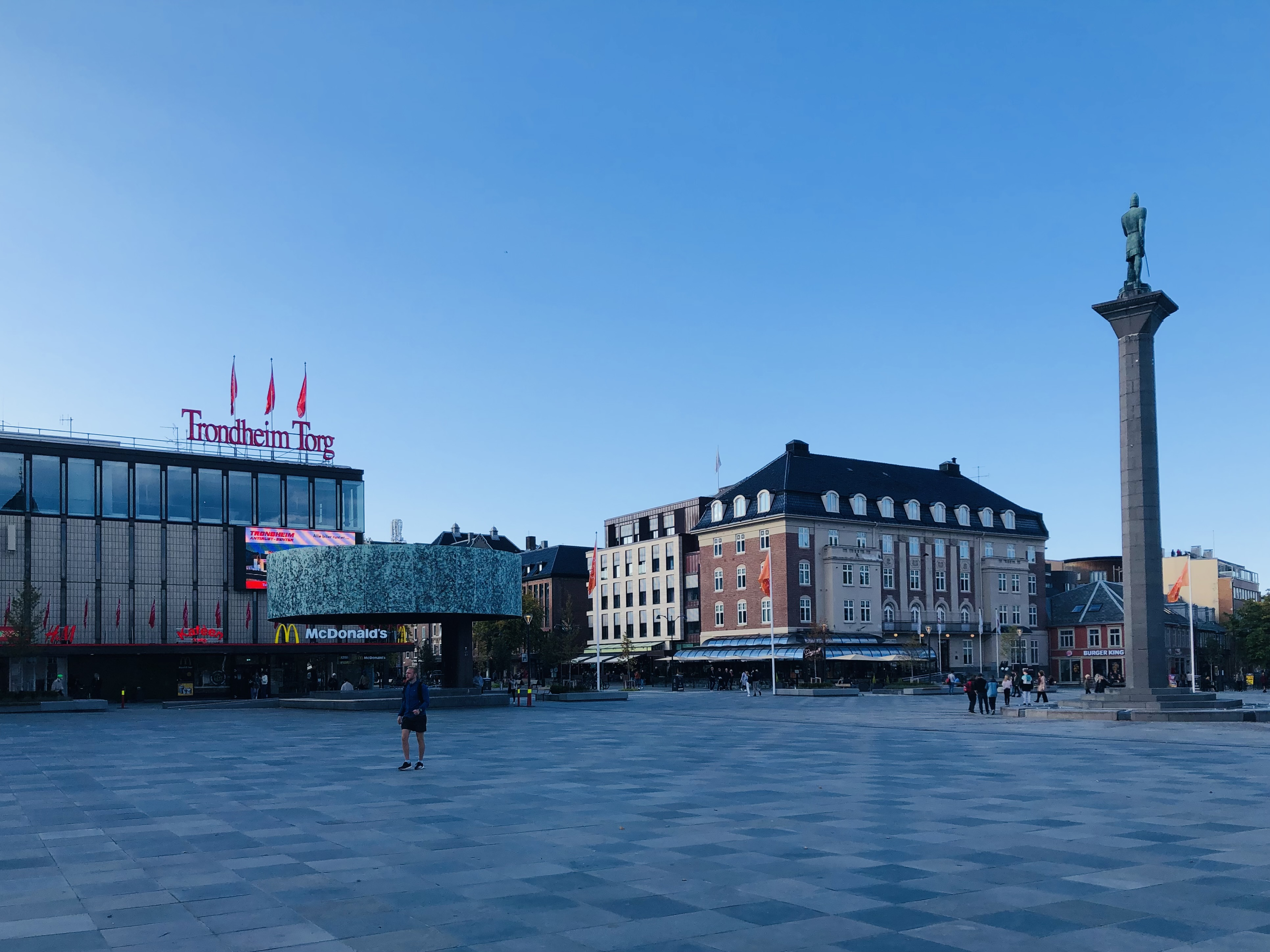
The city's central square (Torvet) in 2020

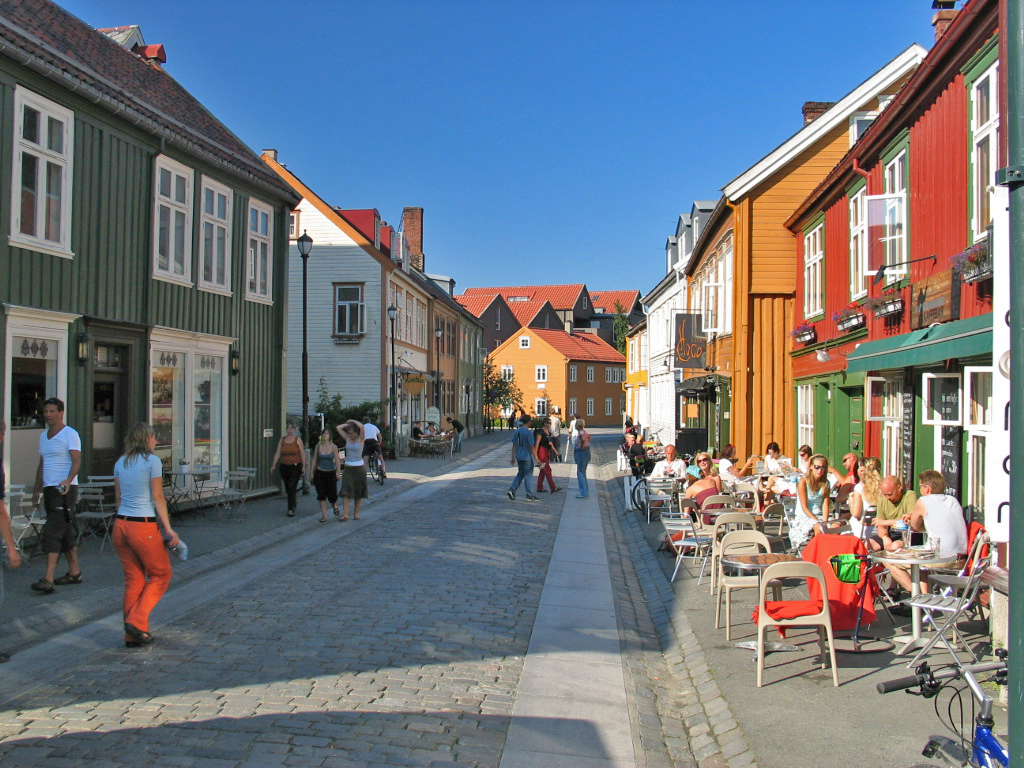
The pavement cafes at Bakklandet

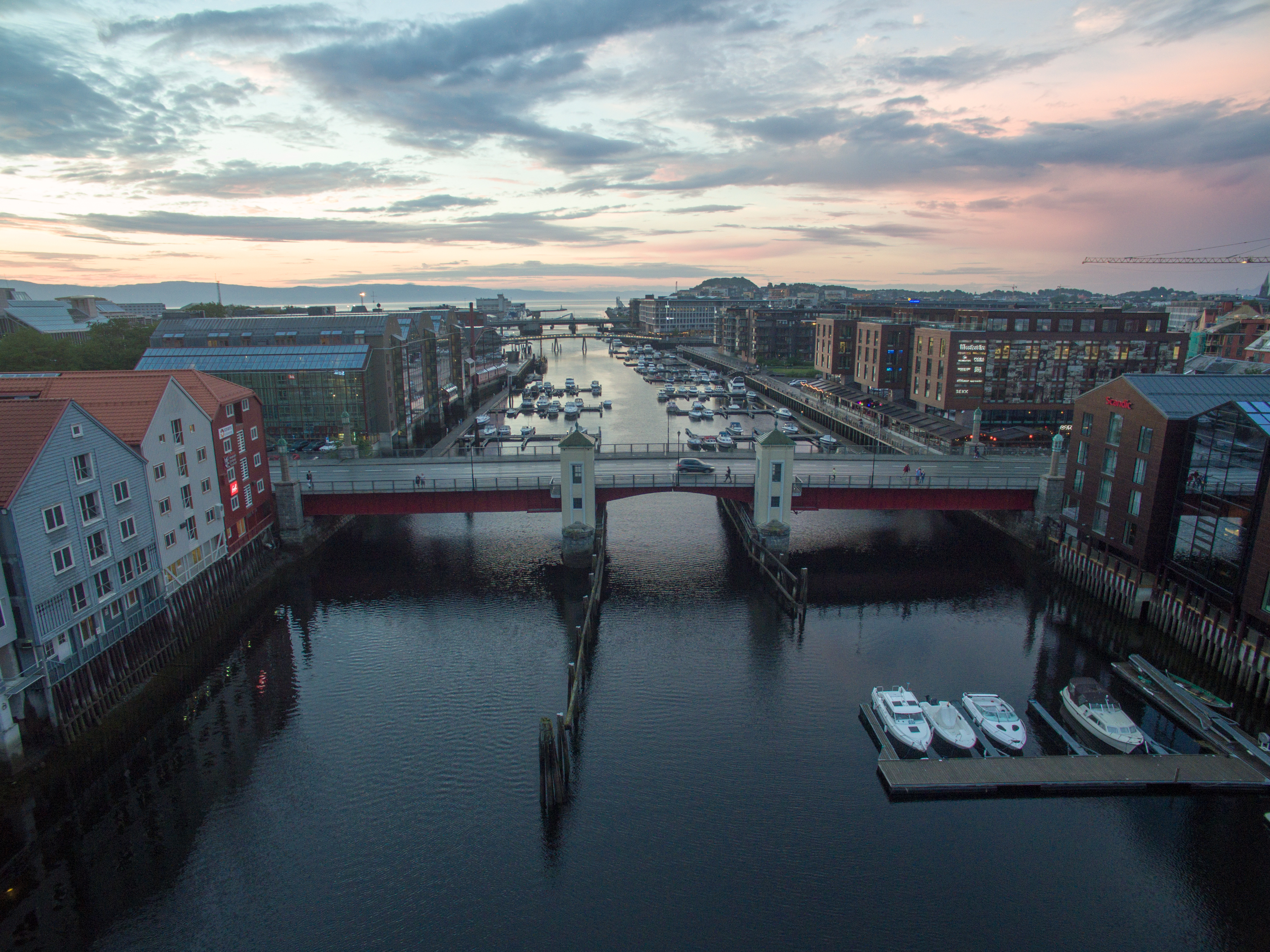
Bakke Bridge

DORA 1 is a German submarine base that housed the 13th U-boat Flotilla during the Second World War occupation of Norway. Today the bunker houses various archives, among them the city archives, the university and state archives. More recently, DORA has been used as a concert venue.

Kristiansten Fortress, built 1681–1684, is located on a hill east of Trondheim. It repelled the invading Swedes in 1718, but was decommissioned in 1816 by Crown Prince Regent Charles John.

A statue of Olav Tryggvason, the founder of Trondheim, is located in the city's central square, mounted on top of an obelisk. The statue base is also a sun dial, but it is calibrated to UTC+1 so that the reading is inaccurate by one hour in the summer.

The islet Munkholmen is a popular tourist attraction and recreation site. The islet has served as a place of execution, a monastery, a fortress, prison, and a Second World War anti-aircraft gun station.

Stiftsgården is the royal residence in Trondheim, originally constructed in 1774 by Cecilie Christine Schøller. At 140 rooms constituting 4,000 square metres (43,056 sq ft), it is possibly the largest wooden building in Northern Europe and has been used by royals and their guests since 1800.

A statue of Leif Ericson is located at the seaside, close to the old Customs Building, the cruise ship facilities and the new swimming hall. The statue is a replica, the original being located at a Seattle marina.

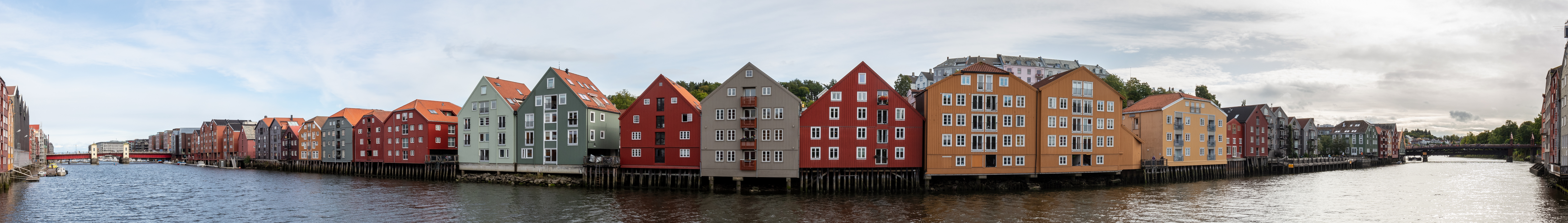
The Nidelva flows through Trondheim with old storehouses flanking both sides of this river. The Old Town Bridge can be seen on the right side of this panorama.

=== Shopping ===
Most of Trondheim's city centre is scattered with small speciality shops. However, the city centre's main shopping area is concentrated around the pedestrianised streets Nordre gate (English: Northern street), Olav Tryggvasons gate and Thomas Angells gate even though the rest of the city centre is provided with everything from old, well-established companies to new, hip and trendy shops.

In the mid-to-late 1990s, the area surrounding the old drydock and ship construction buildings of the defunct Trondhjems mekaniske Værksted shipbuilding company at the Nedre Elvehavn was renovated and old industrial buildings were torn down to make way for condominiums. A shopping centre was also built, known as Solsiden (The Sunny Side). This is a popular residential and shopping area, especially for young people.

Larger multi-mall shopping areas are located in the eastern suburb of Lade-Strindheim along the Haakon VIIs gate and Bromstadvegen streets, and in the southern suburb of Tiller (The latter centred around City Syd). Swedish store chains are widely present throughout the areas, especially in the DIY and clothing store fields, including IKEA, Biltema, and Clas Ohlson.

=== Nidaros Cathedral ===
The Nidaros Cathedral and the Archbishop's Palace are located side by side in the middle of the city centre. The cathedral, built from 1070 on, is the most important Gothic monument in Norway and was Northern Europe's most important Christian pilgrimage site during the Middle Ages, with pilgrimage routes leading to it from Oslo in southern Norway and from the Jämtland and Värmland regions of Sweden. Today, it is the northernmost medieval cathedral in the world, and the second-largest in Scandinavia.

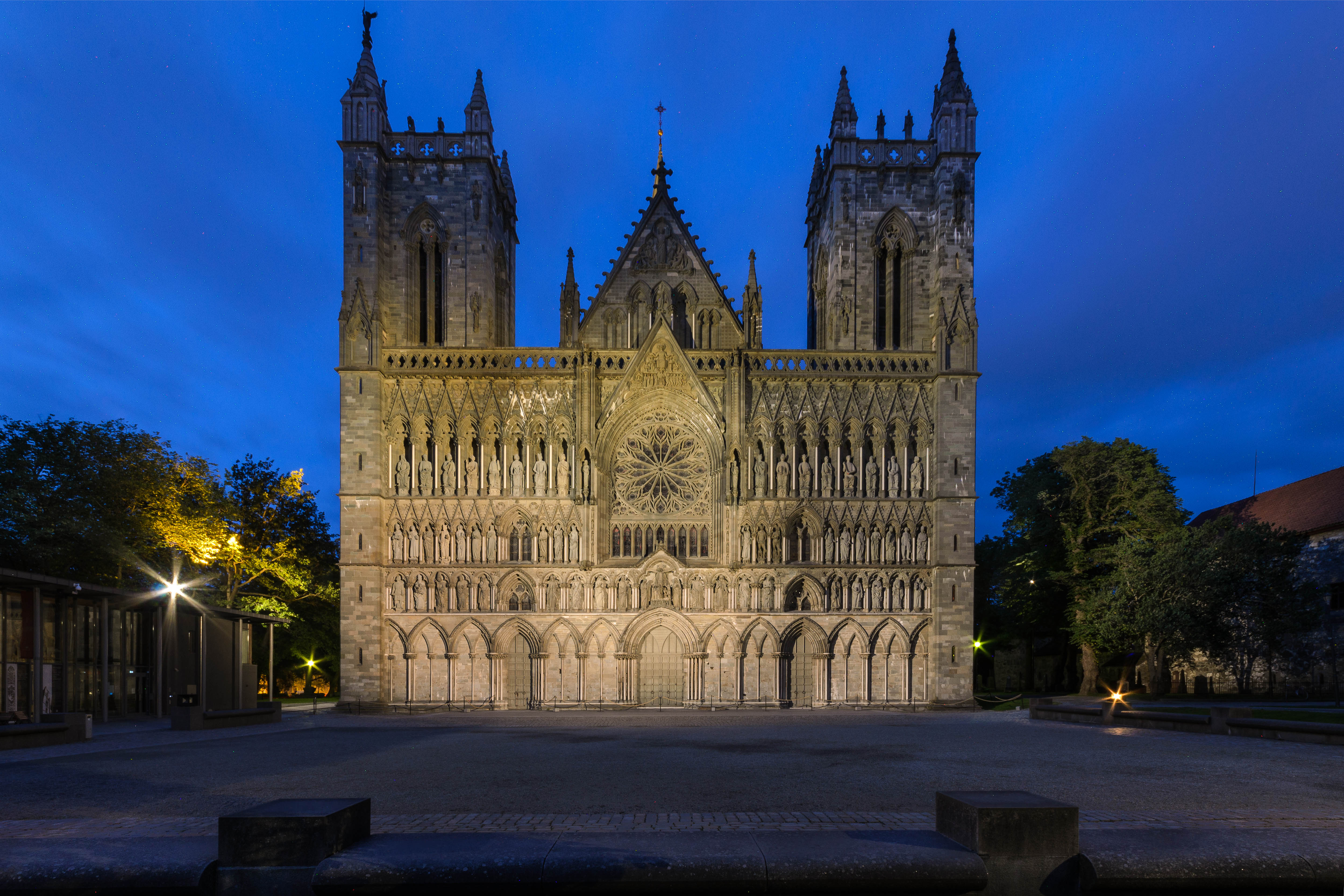
West front of Nidaros Cathedral

During the Middle Ages, and again after independence was restored in 1814, the Nidaros Cathedral was the coronation church of the Norwegian kings. King Haakon VII was the last monarch to be crowned there, in 1906. Starting with King Olav V in 1957, coronation was replaced by consecration. In 1991, the late King Harald V and Queen Sonja were consecrated in the cathedral. On 24 May 2002, their daughter Princess Märtha Louise married the writer Ari Behn in the cathedral.

The Pilgrim's Route (Pilegrimsleden) to the site of Saint Olufs's tomb at Nidaros Cathedral, has recently been re-instated. Also known as St. Olav's Way, (Sankt Olavs vei), the main route, which is approximately 640 kilometres (400 mi) long, starts in Oslo and heads North, along Lake Mjøsa, up the valley Gudbrandsdalen, over the mountain range Dovrefjell and down the Oppdal valley to end at Nidaros Cathedral in Trondheim. There is a Pilgrim's Office in Oslo which gives advice to pilgrims and a Pilgrim Centre in Trondheim, under the aegis of the cathedral, which awards certificates to successful pilgrims upon the completion of their journey.

=== Other churches ===
The Lutheran Church of Norway has 21 churches within the municipality of Trondheim. They are all a part of the Diocese of Nidaros, which is based in Trondheim at the Nidaros Cathedral. Many of the churches are several hundred years old, with a couple which were built almost 1,000 years ago.

Lutheran Churches in Trondheim Municipality
Deanery (prosti)	Parish (sokn)	Church name	Year built	Location
Nidaros	Nidaros Domkirke og Vår Frue	Nidaros Cathedral	1070–1300	Midtbyen
Nidaros	Nidaros Domkirke og Vår Frue	Vår Frue Church	1200	Midtbyen
Nidaros	Bakklandet	Bakke Church	1715	Bakklandet
Nidaros	Lade	Lade Church	1190	Lade
Nidaros	Lademoen	Lademoen Church	1905	Lademoen
Byåsen	Byåsen	Byåsen Church	1974	Byåsen
Byåsen	Ilen	Ilen Church	1889	Ila
Byåsen	Sverresborg	Havstein Church	1857	Sverresborg
Heimdal	Byneset	Byneset Church	1180	Byneset
Heimdal	Heimdal	Heimdal Church	1960	Heimdal
Heimdal	Kolstad	Kolstad Church	1986	Kolstad
Heimdal	Leinstrand	Leinstrand Church	1673	Nypan
Heimdal	Tiller	Tiller Church	1901	Tiller
Strinda	Berg	Berg Church	1972	Berg
Strinda	Bratsberg	Bratsberg Church	1850	Bratsberg
Strinda	Charlottenlund	Charlottenlund Church	1973	Charlottenlund
Strinda	Hoeggen	Hoeggen Church	1997	Lerkendal
Strinda	Ranheim	Ranheim Church	1933	Ranheim
Strinda	Strinda	Strinda Church	1900	Strinda
Strinda	Strindheim	Strindheim Church	1979	Strindheim
Strinda	Tempe	Tempe Church	1960	Lerkendal

The Roman Catholic Sankt Olav domkirke is the cathedral episcopal see of the exempt Territorial Prelature of Trondheim. Being located across the street from the Nidaros Cathedral, the two of them form an unofficial religious quarter along with a synagogue, a Baptist church, a Salvation Army office, and the 8-auditorium cinema Prinsen kinosenter.

=== Museums ===
Sverresborg, also named Zion after King David's castle in Jerusalem, was a fortification built by Sverre Sigurdsson. It is now an open-air museum, consisting of more than 60 buildings. The castle was originally built in 1182–1183, but did not last for long as it was burned down in 1188. However, the Sverresaga indicates it had been restored by 1197.

The Trondheim Science Center (Norwegian: Vitensenteret i Trondheim) is a scientific hands-on experience center. The NTNU University Museum (Norwegian: NTNU Vitenskapsmuseet) is part of the Norwegian University of Science and Technology. There are also a variety of small history, science and natural history museums, such as the Trondheim Maritime Museum, the Armoury, adjacent to the Archbishops's Palace, Kristiansten Fortress, the music and musical instrument museum Ringve National Museum, Ringve Botanical Garden, the Trondheim Tramway Museum, and the Jewish Museum, co-located with the city's synagogue, which is among the northernmost in the world.

Rockheim (Norwegian: Det nasjonale opplevelsessenteret for pop og rock, The National Discovery Center for Pop and Rock) opened at the Pier in August 2010. It is located inside an old warehouse, but characterised by an easily recognisable roof in the shape of a box. "The box" is decorated by thousands of tiny lights that change in a variety of colours and patterns, and is a landmark in the cityscape – especially on dark winter evenings.

=== Prison ===
Vollan District Jail (Norwegian: Vollan kretsfengsel) was a jail during the nazi occupation of Norway and was used to imprison both prisoners of war and criminals. Vollan was not considered a concentration camp. In a summary of prisoners of war in Norway, numerous prisoners were registered at Vollan. One of its roles was as a transit camp for political prisoners. Many prisoners were taken from Vollan to Kristiansten Fortress and shot. The prisoners at Vollan were interrogated at the Mission Hotel in Trondheim. Some were also interrogated by Henry Rinnan and his gang. It was closed in 1971 after the opening of Trondheim Prison at Tunga.

Trondheim Prison (Norwegian: Trondheim fengsel) is a prison that belongs to the Northern Region of the Norwegian Correctional Services. The prison can house 184 inmates.

It consists of four main departments:

- Nermarka ("Tunga") – closed department
- Detention department (no: Forvaringsavdelingen) at Nermarka
- Leira – open division. Through joint positive activities, the individual inmate on certain conditions teaches to be responsible with other people.
- division Kongens gt. – halfway house, located in downtown Trondheim.

=== Attractions ===
The water park and public pool Pirbadet is located on the northernmost shore of the Brattøra district, within walking distance of the central station.

=== Wider urban area ===
Trondheim forms the centre of the Trondheim Region, and is a common commuting point for work, shopping, and healthcare. Although the official list of metropolitan regions of Norway defines the region very broadly, the area of two-way commuting where Trondheim residents too would head outwards for transport, shopping, and upper secondary schools, consists roughly of Trondheim, Malvik, downtown Stjørdal (incl. Værnes), downtown Melhus, Skaun, and the lower sections of Vanvikan in Indre Fosen.

== Government ==
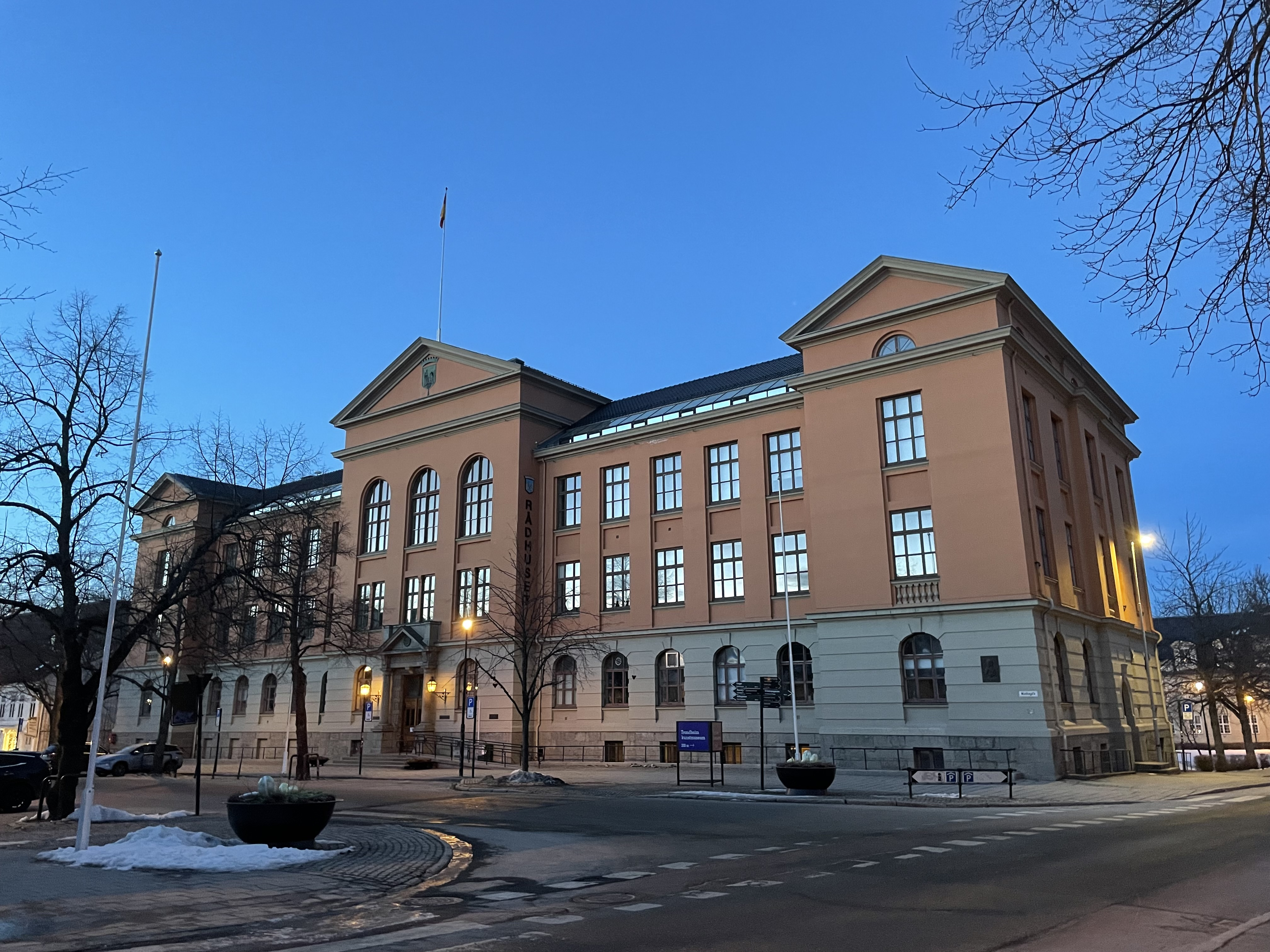
Trondheim's town hall.

Trondheim Municipality is responsible for primary education (through 10th grade), outpatient health services, senior citizen services, welfare and other social services, zoning, economic development, and municipal roads and utilities. The municipality is governed by a municipal council of directly elected representatives. The mayor is indirectly elected by a vote of the municipal council. The municipality is under the jurisdiction of the Trøndelag District Court and the Frostating Court of Appeal.

On 1 January 2005, the city was reorganized from five boroughs into four, with each of these having separate social services offices. The current boroughs are Midtbyen (44,967 inhabitants), Østbyen (42,707 inhabitants), Lerkendal (46,603 inhabitants) and Heimdal (30,744) inhabitants. The Population statistics listed are as of 1 January 2008. Prior to 2005, Trondheim was divided into the boroughs Sentrum, Strinda, Nardo, Byåsen and Heimdal.

=== Municipal council ===
The city council (Bystyret) of Trondheim Municipality is made up of 67 representatives that are elected to four year terms. Prior to 2011, there were 85 city council members, but this number was reduced to 67 in 2011. The tables below show the current and historical composition of the council by political party.

Trondheim kommunestyre 2023–2027
Party name (in Norwegian)	Number of representatives
Labour Party (Arbeiderpartiet)	17
Progress Party (Fremskrittspartiet)	4
Green Party (Miljøpartiet De Grønne)	4
Conservative Party (Høyre)	20
Industry and Business Party (Industri‑ og Næringspartiet)	1
Christian Democratic Party (Kristelig Folkeparti)	1
Pensioners' Party (Pensjonistpartiet)	3
Red Party (Rødt)	3
Centre Party (Senterpartiet)	1
Socialist Left Party (Sosialistisk Venstreparti)	9
Liberal Party (Venstre)	4
Total number of members:	67

Trondheim bystyre 2019–2023
Party name (in Norwegian)	Number of representatives
Labour Party (Arbeiderpartiet)	17
Progress Party (Fremskrittspartiet)	4
Green Party (Miljøpartiet De Grønne)	7
Conservative Party (Høyre)	14
Christian Democratic Party (Kristelig Folkeparti)	1
Pensioners' Party (Pensjonistpartiet)	3
Red Party (Rødt)	5
Centre Party (Senterpartiet)	5
Socialist Left Party (Sosialistisk Venstreparti)	8
Liberal Party (Venstre)	3
Total number of members:	67

Trondheim bystyre 2015–2019
Party name (in Norwegian)	Number of representatives
Labour Party (Arbeiderpartiet)	28
Progress Party (Fremskrittspartiet)	4
Green Party (Miljøpartiet De Grønne)	5
Conservative Party (Høyre)	14
Christian Democratic Party (Kristelig Folkeparti)	2
Pensioners' Party (Pensjonistpartiet)	2
Red Party (Rødt)	2
Centre Party (Senterpartiet)	2
Socialist Left Party (Sosialistisk Venstreparti)	4
Liberal Party (Venstre)	4
Total number of members:	67

Trøndheim bystyre 2011–2015
Party name (in Norwegian)	Number of representatives
Labour Party (Arbeiderpartiet)	27
Progress Party (Fremskrittspartiet)	6
Green Party (Miljøpartiet De Grønne)	2
Conservative Party (Høyre)	18
Christian Democratic Party (Kristelig Folkeparti)	2
Pensioners' Party (Pensjonistpartiet)	1
Red Party (Rødt)	2
Centre Party (Senterpartiet)	1
Socialist Left Party (Sosialistisk Venstreparti)	4
Liberal Party (Venstre)	4
Total number of members:	67

Trondheim bystyre 2007–2011
Party name (in Norwegian)	Number of representatives
Labour Party (Arbeiderpartiet)	37
Progress Party (Fremskrittspartiet)	13
Green Party (Miljøpartiet De Grønne)	2
Conservative Party (Høyre)	13
Christian Democratic Party (Kristelig Folkeparti)	3
The Democrats (Demokratene)	1
Pensioners' Party (Pensjonistpartiet)	1
Red Electoral Alliance (Rød Valgallianse)	3
Centre Party (Senterpartiet)	2
Socialist Left Party (Sosialistisk Venstreparti)	7
Liberal Party (Venstre)	3
Total number of members:	85

Trondheim bystyre 2003–2007
Party name (in Norwegian)	Number of representatives
Labour Party (Arbeiderpartiet)	26
Progress Party (Fremskrittspartiet)	10
Green Party (Miljøpartiet De Grønne)	1
Conservative Party (Høyre)	18
Christian Democratic Party (Kristelig Folkeparti)	3
The Democrats (Demokratene)	1
Pensioners' Party (Pensjonistpartiet)	4
Red Electoral Alliance (Rød Valgallianse)	2
Centre Party (Senterpartiet)	3
Socialist Left Party (Sosialistisk Venstreparti)	15
Liberal Party (Venstre)	2
Total number of members:	85

Trondheim bystyre 1999–2003
Party name (in Norwegian)	Number of representatives
Labour Party (Arbeiderpartiet)	26
Progress Party (Fremskrittspartiet)	7
Green Party (Miljøpartiet De Grønne)	1
Conservative Party (Høyre)	30
Christian Democratic Party (Kristelig Folkeparti)	4
Pensioners' Party (Pensjonistpartiet)	1
Red Electoral Alliance (Rød Valgallianse)	3
Centre Party (Senterpartiet)	1
Socialist Left Party (Sosialistisk Venstreparti)	8
Liberal Party (Venstre)	3
City list (Bylista)	1
Total number of members:	85

Trondheim bystyre 1995–1999
Party name (in Norwegian)	Number of representatives
Labour Party (Arbeiderpartiet)	22
Progress Party (Fremskrittspartiet)	6
Green Party (Miljøpartiet De Grønne)	1
Conservative Party (Høyre)	36
Christian Democratic Party (Kristelig Folkeparti)	4
Red Electoral Alliance (Rød Valgallianse)	2
Centre Party (Senterpartiet)	3
Socialist Left Party (Sosialistisk Venstreparti)	5
Liberal Party (Venstre)	3
City list (Bylista)	3
Total number of members:	85

Trondheim bystyre 1991–1995
Party name (in Norwegian)	Number of representatives
Labour Party (Arbeiderpartiet)	22
Progress Party (Fremskrittspartiet)	4
Green Party (Miljøpartiet De Grønne)	1
Conservative Party (Høyre)	29
Christian Democratic Party (Kristelig Folkeparti)	4
Red Electoral Alliance (Rød Valgallianse)	2
Centre Party (Senterpartiet)	5
Socialist Left Party (Sosialistisk Venstreparti)	12
Liberal Party (Venstre)	2
City List (Bylista)	4
Total number of members:	85

Trondheim bystyre 1987–1991
Party name (in Norwegian)	Number of representatives
Labour Party (Arbeiderpartiet)	31
Progress Party (Fremskrittspartiet)	11
Conservative Party (Høyre)	21
Christian Democratic Party (Kristelig Folkeparti)	4
Red Electoral Alliance (Rød Valgallianse)	2
Centre Party (Senterpartiet)	2
Socialist Left Party (Sosialistisk Venstreparti)	5
Liberal Party (Venstre)	3
City List (Bylista)	6
Total number of members:	85

Trondheim bystyre 1983–1987
Party name (in Norwegian)	Number of representatives
Labour Party (Arbeiderpartiet)	35
Progress Party (Fremskrittspartiet)	5
Conservative Party (Høyre)	28
Christian Democratic Party (Kristelig Folkeparti)	4
Red Electoral Alliance (Rød Valgallianse)	2
Centre Party (Senterpartiet)	2
Socialist Left Party (Sosialistisk Venstreparti)	6
Liberal Party (Venstre)	3
Total number of members:	85

Trondheim bystyre 1979–1983
Party name (in Norwegian)	Number of representatives
Labour Party (Arbeiderpartiet)	36
Progress Party (Fremskrittspartiet)	1
Conservative Party (Høyre)	30
Christian Democratic Party (Kristelig Folkeparti)	5
Red Electoral Alliance (Rød Valgallianse)	1
Centre Party (Senterpartiet)	3
Socialist Left Party (Sosialistisk Venstreparti)	5
Liberal Party (Venstre)	4
Total number of members:	85

Trondheim bystyre 1975–1979
Party name (in Norwegian)	Number of representatives
Labour Party (Arbeiderpartiet)	34
Conservative Party (Høyre)	24
Christian Democratic Party (Kristelig Folkeparti)	8
New People's Party (Nye Folkepartiet)	2
Red Electoral Alliance (Rød Valgallianse)	1
Centre Party (Senterpartiet)	6
Socialist Left Party (Sosialistisk Venstreparti)	7
Liberal Party (Venstre)	3
Total number of members:	85

Trondheim bystyre 1971–1975
Party name (in Norwegian)	Number of representatives
Labour Party (Arbeiderpartiet)	40
Conservative Party (Høyre)	19
Communist Party (Kommunistiske Parti)	2
Christian Democratic Party (Kristelig Folkeparti)	6
Centre Party (Senterpartiet)	6
Socialist People's Party (Sosialistisk Folkeparti)	7
Liberal Party (Venstre)	5
Total number of members:	85

Trondheim bystyre 1967–1971
Party name (in Norwegian)	Number of representatives
Labour Party (Arbeiderpartiet)	43
Conservative Party (Høyre)	22
Communist Party (Kommunistiske Parti)	1
Christian Democratic Party (Kristelig Folkeparti)	4
Centre Party (Senterpartiet)	3
Socialist People's Party (Sosialistisk Folkeparti)	7
Liberal Party (Venstre)	5
Total number of members:	85

Trondheim bystyre 1963–1967
Party name (in Norwegian)	Number of representatives
Labour Party (Arbeiderpartiet)	45
Conservative Party (Høyre)	23
Communist Party (Kommunistiske Parti)	3
Christian Democratic Party (Kristelig Folkeparti)	5
Centre Party (Senterpartiet)	3
Socialist People's Party (Sosialistisk Folkeparti)	3
Liberal Party (Venstre)	3
Total number of members:	85

Trondheim bystyre 1959–1963
Party name (in Norwegian)	Number of representatives
Labour Party (Arbeiderpartiet)	41
Conservative Party (Høyre)	21
Communist Party (Kommunistiske Parti)	6
Christian Democratic Party (Kristelig Folkeparti)	5
Centre Party (Senterpartiet)	1
Liberal Party (Venstre)	3
Total number of members:	77

Trondheim bystyre 1955–1959
Party name (in Norwegian)	Number of representatives
Labour Party (Arbeiderpartiet)	38
Conservative Party (Høyre)	21
Communist Party (Kommunistiske Parti)	9
Christian Democratic Party (Kristelig Folkeparti)	6
Liberal Party (Venstre)	3
Total number of members:	77

Trondheim bystyre 1951–1955
Party name (in Norwegian)	Number of representatives
Labour Party (Arbeiderpartiet)	36
Conservative Party (Høyre)	20
Communist Party (Kommunistiske Parti)	10
Christian Democratic Party (Kristelig Folkeparti)	6
Liberal Party (Venstre)	4
Total number of members:	76

Trondheim bystyre 1947–1951
Party name (in Norwegian)	Number of representatives
Labour Party (Arbeiderpartiet)	31
Conservative Party (Høyre)	19
Communist Party (Kommunistiske Parti)	15
Christian Democratic Party (Kristelig Folkeparti)	5
Liberal Party (Venstre)	6
Total number of members:	76

Trondheim bystyre 1945–1947
Party name (in Norwegian)	Number of representatives
Labour Party (Arbeiderpartiet)	30
Conservative Party (Høyre)	14
Communist Party (Kommunistiske Parti)	18
Christian Democratic Party (Kristelig Folkeparti)	9
Liberal Party (Venstre)	5
Total number of members:	76

Trondheim bystyre 1937–1941*
Party name (in Norwegian)	Number of representatives
Labour Party (Arbeiderpartiet)	33
Free-minded People's Party (Frisinnede Folkeparti)	11
Conservative Party (Høyre)	21
Communist Party (Kommunistiske Parti)	8
Liberal Party (Venstre)	3
Total number of members:	76
Note: Due to the German occupation of Norway during World War II, no elections were held for new municipal councils until after the war ended in 1945.

Trondheim bystyre 1934–1937
Party name (in Norwegian)	Number of representatives
Labour Party (Arbeiderpartiet)	29
Free-minded People's Party (Frisinnede Folkeparti)	16
Conservative Party (Høyre)	18
Communist Party (Kommunistiske Parti)	8
Liberal Party (Venstre)	4
Local List(s) (Lokale lister)	1
Total number of members:	76

Trondheim bystyre 1931–1934
Party name (in Norwegian)	Number of representatives
Labour Party (Arbeiderpartiet)	24
Temperance Party (Avholdspartiet)	2
Free-minded People's Party (Frisinnede Folkeparti)	11
Conservative Party (Høyre)	22
Communist Party (Kommunistiske Parti)	10
Liberal Party (Venstre)	3
Joint List(s) of Non-Socialist Parties (Borgerlige Felleslister)	4
Total number of members:	76

Trondhjem / Nidaros bystyre 1928–1931
Party name (in Norwegian)	Number of representatives
Labour Party (Arbeiderpartiet)	28
Temperance Party (Avholdspartiet)	4
Free-minded Liberal Party (Frisinnede Venstre)	9
Conservative Party (Høyre)	22
Communist Party (Kommunistiske Parti)	9
Liberal Party (Venstre)	4
Total number of members:	76

Trondhjem bystyre 1925–1928
Party name (in Norwegian)	Number of representatives
Labour Party (Arbeiderpartiet)	18
Temperance Party (Avholdspartiet)	3
Free-minded Liberal Party (Frisinnede Venstre)	9
Conservative Party (Høyre)	21
Communist Party (Kommunistiske Parti)	12
Social Democratic Labour Party (Socialdemokratiske Arbeiderparti)	4
Liberal Party (Venstre)	5
Workers' Common List (Arbeidernes fellesliste)	4
Total number of members:	76

Trondhjem bystyre 1922–1925
Party name (in Norwegian)	Number of representatives
Labour Party (Arbeiderpartiet)	28
Free-minded Liberal Party (Frisinnede Venstre)	9
Conservative Party (Høyre)	18
Social Democratic Labour Party (Socialdemokratiske Arbeiderparti)	7
Liberal Party (Venstre)	5
Local List(s) (Lokale lister)	9
Total number of members:	76

Trondhjem bystyre 1919–1922
Party name (in Norwegian)	Number of representatives
Labour Party (Arbeiderpartiet)	22
Temperance Party (Avholdspartiet)	5
Free-minded Liberal Party (Frisinnede Venstre)	8
Conservative Party (Høyre)	22
Liberal Party (Venstre)	4
Local List(s) (Lokale lister)	7
Total number of members:	68

Trondhjem bystyre 1917–1919
Party name (in Norwegian)	Number of representatives
Labour Party (Arbeiderpartiet)	32
Free-minded Liberal Party (Frisinnede Venstre)	6
Conservative Party (Høyre)	20
Liberal Party (Venstre)	7
Joint list of the Conservative Party (Høyre) and the Free-minded Liberal Party (Frisinnede Venstre)	3
Total number of members:	68

Trondhjem bystyre 1914–1916
Party name (in Norwegian)	Number of representatives
Labour Party (Arbeiderpartiet)	26
Temperance Party (Avholdspartiet)	3
Free-minded Liberal Party (Frisinnede Venstre)	8
Conservative Party (Høyre)	21
Liberal Party (Venstre)	10
Total number of members:	68

== Education and research ==
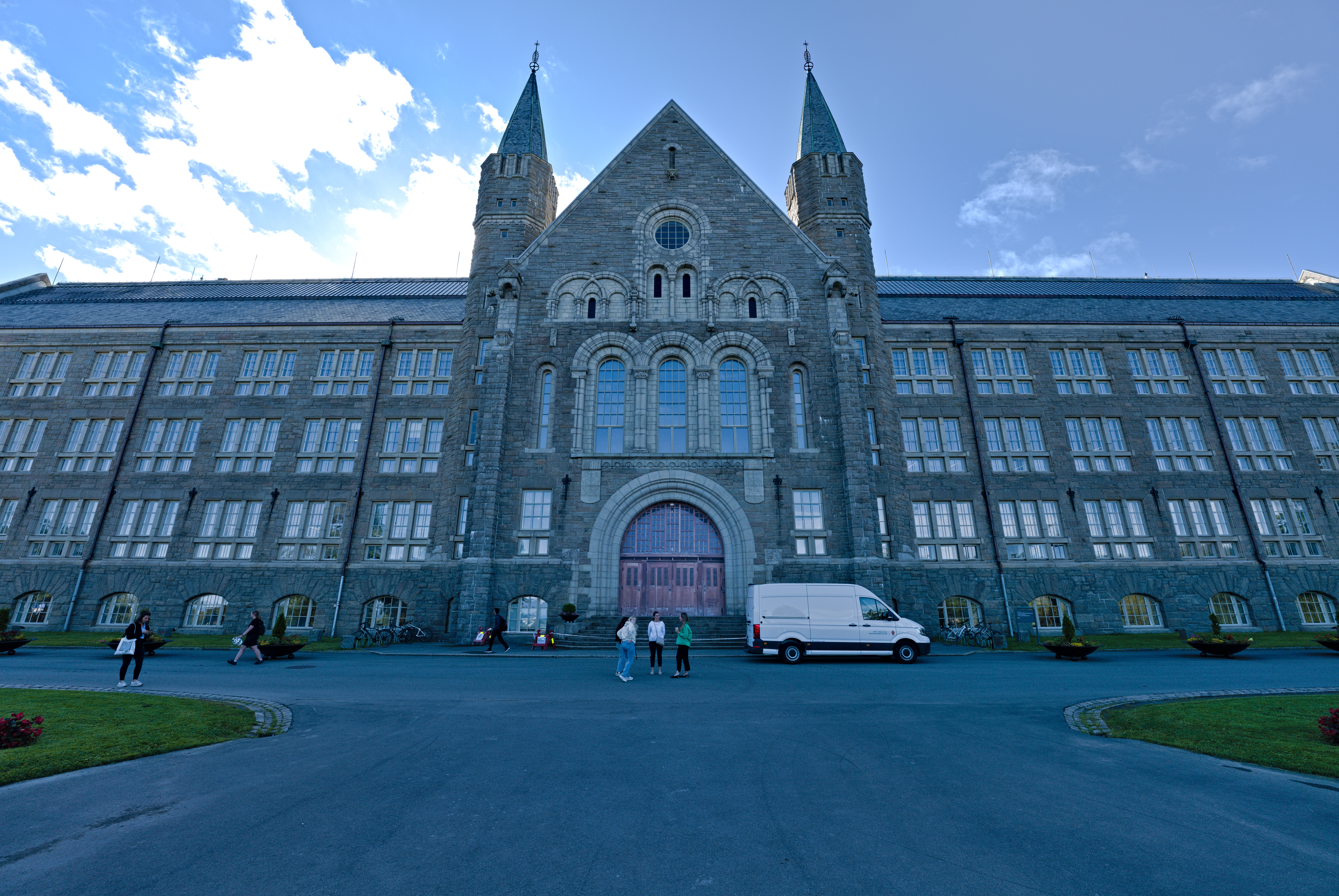
NTNU's main building

See also the list of primary schools in Trondheim.

Trondheim is home to both the Norwegian University of Science and Technology (NTNU) with its many technical lab facilities and disciplines, and BI-Trondheim, a satellite campus for the Norwegian Business School (BI). Both universities welcome a number of international students on a yearly basis and offer various scholarships.

St. Olav's University Hospital, a regional hospital for Central Norway, is located in downtown Trondheim. St. Olav's is a teaching hospital and cooperates closely with the Norwegian University of Science and Technology (NTNU) on both research and medical education.

SINTEF, a large independent research organisation in Scandinavia, has 1,800 employees with 1,300 of these located in Trondheim. The Air Force Academy of the Royal Norwegian Air Force is located at Kuhaugen in Trondheim.

The Geological Survey of Norway is located at Lade in Trondheim and is a major geoscientific institution with 220 employees of which 70% are scientists.

There are 11 high schools in the city. Trondheim katedralskole ("Trondheim Cathedral School") was founded in 1152 and is the oldest upper secondary school (gymnasium) in Norway, while Charlottenlund videregående skole is the largest in Sør-Trøndelag with its 1,100 students and 275 employees. Brundalen Skole, has big festivals each year, and is building out to increase space.

Ila skole was founded in 1770 and is the oldest primary school in Trondheim.

== Media ==
Adresseavisen is the largest regional newspaper and the oldest active newspaper in Norway, having been established in 1767. The two headquarters of the Norwegian Broadcasting Corporation (NRK) are located at Tyholt in Trondheim, and in Oslo. On 31 December 2019 the fully digital and local newspaper Nidaros was launched as a competitor to Adresseavisen. The student press of Trondheim features three types of media. Under Dusken is the student paper, Radio Revolt is the student radio, and Student-TV broadcasts videos online.

Radio stations established in Trondheim include Trøndelag-focused opt-out feeds of NRK P1 and NRK P1+, a local version of NRK Yr's radio station, and Radio Revolt. Along with Norway's national radio stations, they can be listened to on DAB+ across most of Trøndelag, as well as on internet radio. As of 2017, the commercial stations Radio Trondheim and Radio 247 also broadcast from within Trondheim, but as of May 2025 there are no commercial local stations that broadcast from within Trondheim Municipality proper, but intra-regional stations like Nea Radio, Radio Trøndelag, and P5 Fosen (Not to be mistaken for the national P5 Hits) are fully available on DAB+ in Trondheim.

== Culture ==
=== Visual arts ===
The Trondheim Art Museum has Norway's third largest public art collection, mainly Norwegian art from the last 150 years.

The National Museum of Decorative Arts and Design boasts a collection of decorative arts and design, including tapestries from the Norwegian tapestry artist Hannah Ryggen, as well as Norway's only permanent exhibibition of Japanese arts and crafts.

Trøndelag senter for samtidskunst (English: Trøndelag Centre for Contemporary Art, TSSK) was established in 1976.

There are two artist-run spaces, Galleri Blunk, that was founded by students of the Trondheim Academy of Fine Art in 2002, and Babel, that was founded by Lademoen Kunstnerverksteder (English: Lademoen Artist Workshops, LKV) in 2006.

Kunsthall Trondheim was inaugurated at its permanent premises on Kongens gate in October 2016.

The PoMo Museum, dedicated to modern and contemporary art, opened on Dronningens gate in February 2025.

=== Stage ===
The main regional theatre, Trøndelag Teater, is situated in Trondheim. Built in 1816, the theatre is the oldest theatre still in use in Scandinavia. The city also features an alternative theatre house Teaterhuset Avant Garden, and the theatre company Teater Fusentast.

=== Music ===
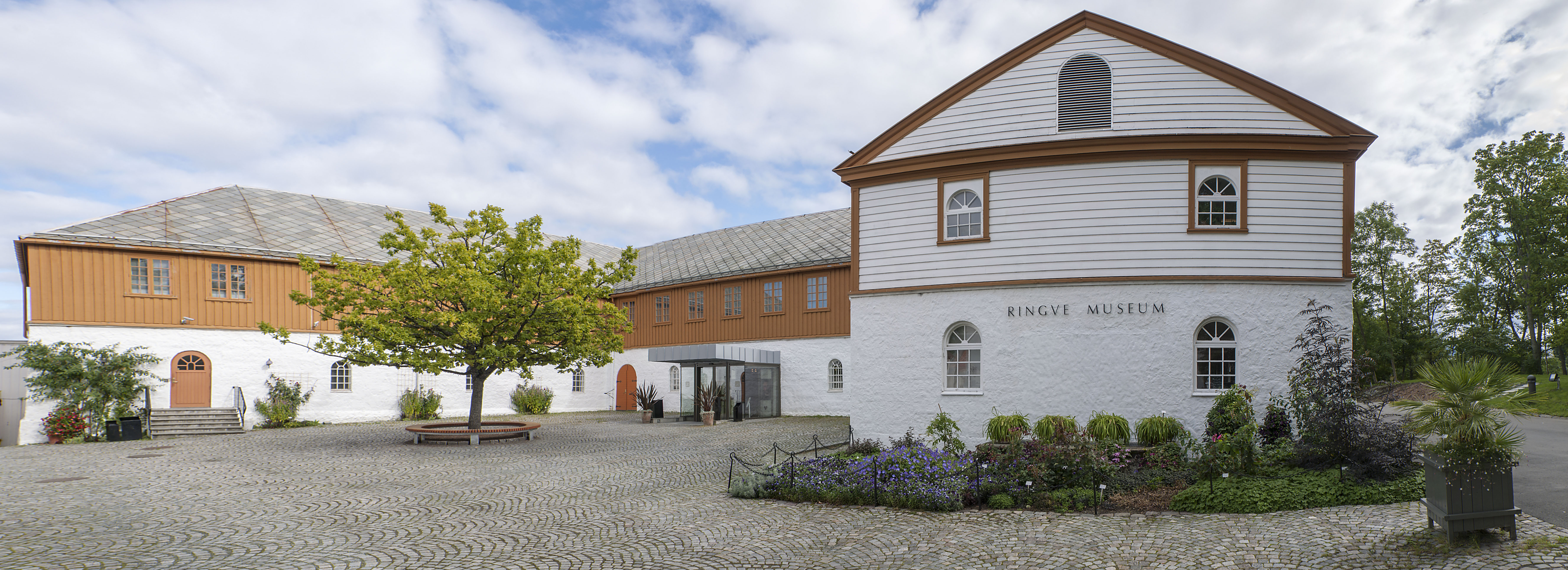
The Ringve Museum is a museum devoted to music

Trondheim has a broad music scene, and is known for its strong communities committed to rock, jazz and classical music. The city's interest in Jazz and classical music are spearheaded by the music conservatory at NTNU which has been called one of the most innovative in the world, and the municipal music school, Trondheim Kommunale Musikk- og Kulturskole. The Trondheim Symphony Orchestra and the Trondheim Soloists are well-known. The city hosts a yearly Jazz festival, and is home to Trondheim Jazz Orchestra. The Fjordgata Records label is also hosted in Trondheim.

Classical artists hailing from Trondheim include violinist Arve Tellefsen, Elise Båtnes and Marianne Thorsen. Also the Nidaros Cathedral Boys' Choir.

Thomas Bergersen, a Norwegian self-taught composer, multi-instrumentalist, and the co-founder of the production music company Two Steps From Hell, was born in Trondheim.

Pop/rock artists and bands associated with Trondheim include Åge Aleksandersen, Margaret Berger, DumDum Boys, Lasse Marhaug, Gåte, Keep Of Kalessin, Lumsk, Motorpsycho, Kari Rueslåtten, the 3rd and the Mortal, TNT, Tre Små Kinesere, the Kids, Bokassa, Casino Steel (of the Boys), Atrox, Bloodthorn, Celestial Bloodshed, Manes, child prodigy Malin Reitan and Aleksander With. The most popular punk scene is UFFA.

Georg Kajanus, creator of the bands Eclection, Sailor and DATA, was born in Trondheim. The music production team Stargate started out in Trondheim.

Trondheim is also home to Rockheim, the national museum of popular music, which is responsible for collecting, preserving and sharing Norwegian popular music from the 1950s to the present day.

=== Film ===
Trondheim features a lively film scene, including three filmfests: Minimalen Short Film Fest and Kosmorama International Film Fest in March, and Trondheim Documentarfestival in November. Trondheim has two cinemas in the center of the city, Prinsen Kino and Nova kino Prinsen Kinosenter, Nova Kinosenter

=== Student culture ===
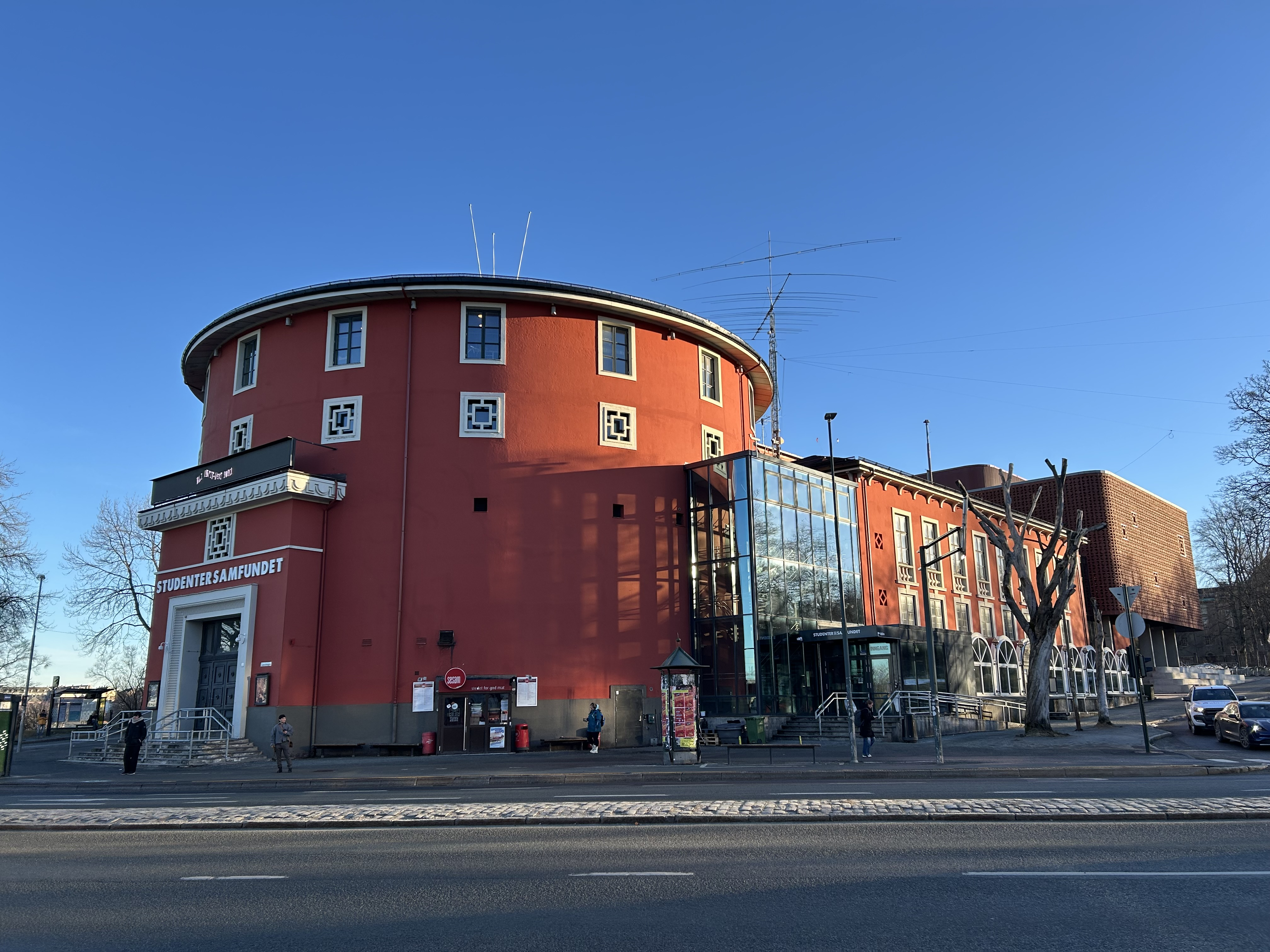
The building of the Studentersamfundet i Trondhjem

With students comprising almost a fifth of the population, the city of Trondheim is heavily influenced by student culture. Most noticeable is Studentersamfundet i Trondhjem, the city's student society. Its characteristic round, red building from 1929 sits at the head of the bridge crossing the river southwards from the city centre. As the largest university in Norway, the Norwegian University of Science and Technology (NTNU) is the host of some 36,000 students.

Student culture in Trondheim is characterised by a long-standing tradition of volunteer work. The student society is for example run by more than 1,200 volunteers. NTNUI, Norway's largest sports club, is among the other volunteer organisations that dominate student culture in Trondheim. Students in Trondheim are also behind two major Norwegian culture festivals, UKA and The International Student Festival in Trondheim (ISFiT). NTNU lists over 200 student organisations with registered web pages on its servers alone.

=== In popular culture ===
Trondheim culture is parodied on the Monty Python album Another Monty Python Record in the form of the fictitious Trondheim Hammer Dance.

Trondheim is also a key location in the Command & Conquer: Tiberian Sun universe, as it is a critical battleground for both factions.

Trondheim was the name of a planet in the Hundred Worlds of the Ender's Game novel series.

Trondheim likely serves as an inspiration for the fictional city Tronjheim in The Inheritance Cycle.

== Sports and recreation ==
Granåsen Ski Centre, a Nordic skiing venue located in Byåsen, regularly hosts World Cup competitions in ski jumping, biathlon and cross-country skiing, as well as the 1997 and 2025 FIS Nordic World Ski Championships. Trondheim attempted but failed to become the Norwegian candidate for the 2018 Winter Olympics. Hiking and recreational skiing is available around the city, particularly in Bymarka, which can be reached by the tramway. Trondheim Golfklubb, one of the oldest golf clubs in Norway, has a nine-hole golf course in Byåsen. Byneset Golfklubb has a full 18 hole par 72 course, which has hosted the Norwegian Challenge of the Challenge Tour in 2012, as well as a short and easy 9 hole course, located at Spongdal. Klæbu Golfklubb in Klæbu has another 9 hole course, albeit with artificial greens. There's also a public (no golf experience of course required) 9 hole par 3 course with a nice view overlooking the city centre at Byåsen.

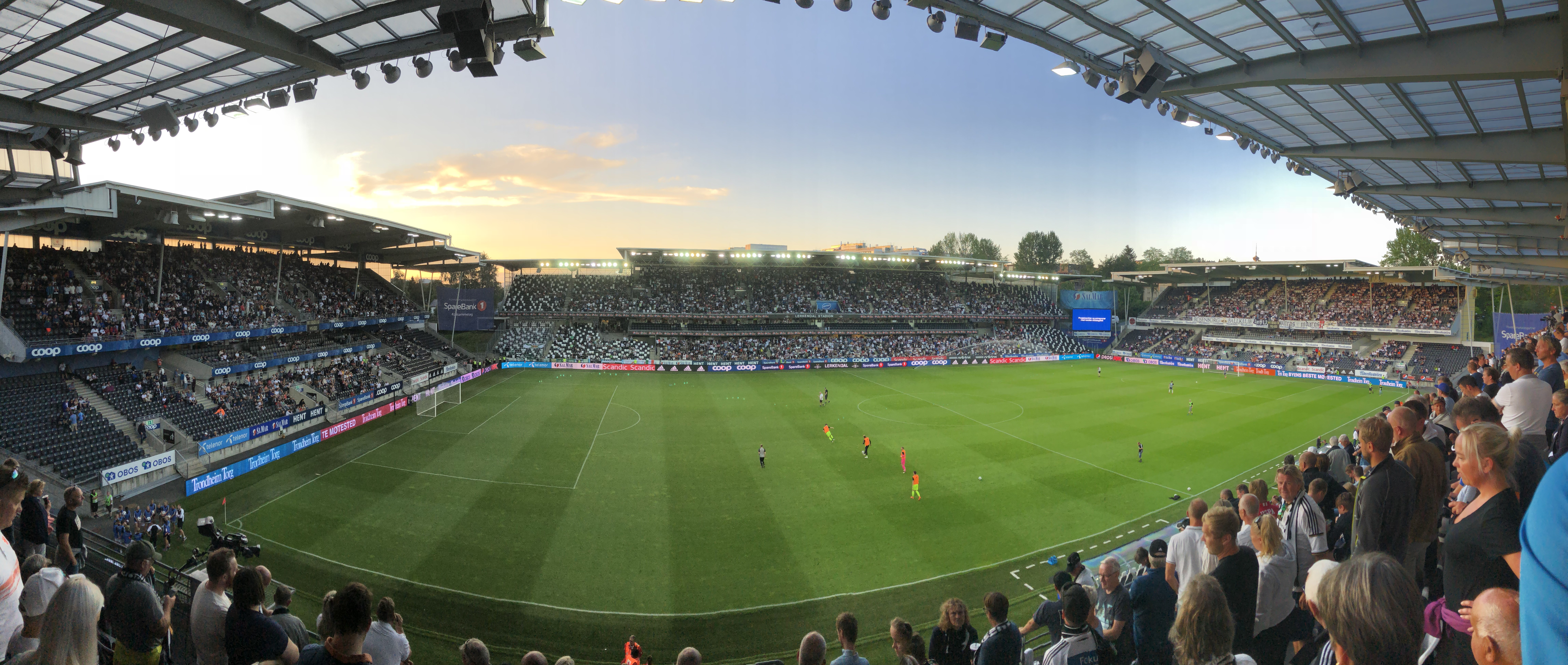
Rosenborg's Lerkendal Stadium.

Rosenborg BK is the city's only top flight football club. They play their home matches at Lerkendal Stadion. They have won the Norwegian Premier League 26 times between 1967 and 2018, have reached the UEFA Champions League group stage 12 times, and made it to the last 8 on one occasion. Ranheim Fotball was promoted from the Norwegian First Division to join Eliteserien in 2018. They finished seventh in their first season in the top flight, but finished last the following season and was relegated. They have played in the first division since the 2020 season. Ranheim's home ground is the EXTRA Arena.

Byåsen IL plays in the women's handball league, and used to be a regular in the EHF Women's Champions League, whereas Kolstad Håndball plays in the men's handball league and have played in the 2023–24 and 2024–25 seasons of the EHF Champions League. The 2 teams variably play their home games at Trondheim Spektrum and Kolstad Arena depending on expected attendances and economic viability.

Trondheim and Trøndelag is also regarded as the home of the basse game, a game played using a ball made from tightly bound rubber bands.

=== Major sports teams ===
Club	Sport	Founded	League	Venue
Rosenborg BK	Football	1917	Eliteserien (football)	Lerkendal stadion
Ranheim Fotball	Football	1901	OBOS-ligaen	EXTRA Arena
Byåsen	Handball (Women)	1921	Eliteserien (women's handball)	Kolstad Arena
Nidaros Hockey	Ice hockey	2015	1. divisjon	Leangen Ishall
Rosenborg BK Kvinner	Football (women)	1972	Toppserien	Koteng Arena
Kolstad Håndball	Handball (men)	1972	Eliteserien (men's handball)	Kolstad Arena
Spektra Cricket	Cricket	2014	NCF Menn	Lade and Spektrum
Nidaros Jets	Basketball	2014	BLNO Menn	Husebyhallen

=== Major championships hosted ===
Event	Sport	Years	Venue
FIS Nordic World Ski Championships	Nordic skiing	1997, 2025	Granåsen
World Allround Speed Skating Championships	Speed skating	1907, 1911, 1926, 1933, 1937	Øya Stadion
IHF World Women's Handball Championship	Handball	1993, 1999, 2023	Trondheim Spektrum
IHF World Men's Handball Championship	Handball	2025	Trondheim Spektrum
European Men's Handball Championship	Handball	2008, 2020	Trondheim Spektrum
World Orienteering Championships	Orienteering	2010	Throughout Trondheim
UEFA Super Cup	Football	2016	Lerkendal Stadion

== Transportation ==
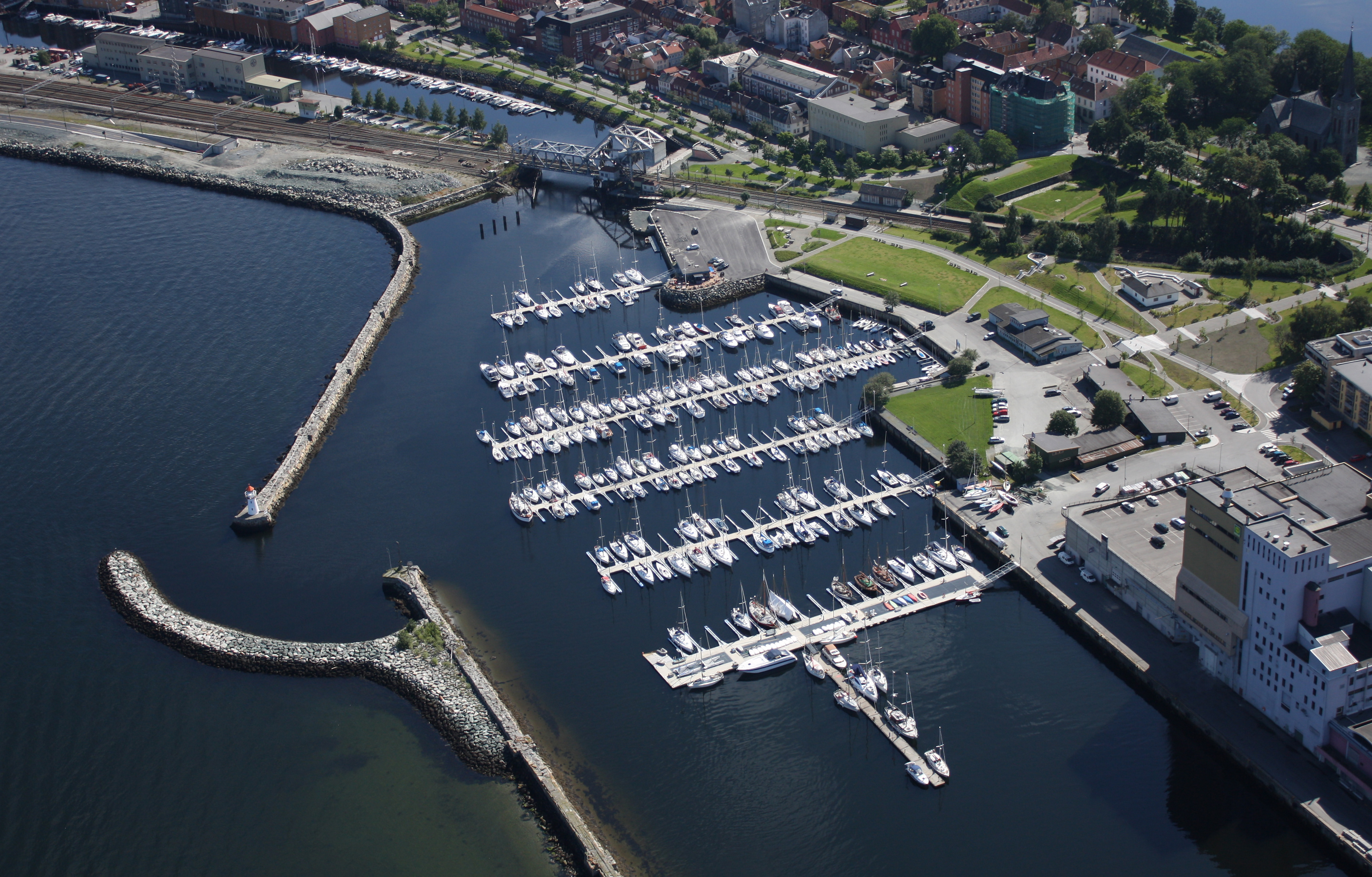
Skansen Marina

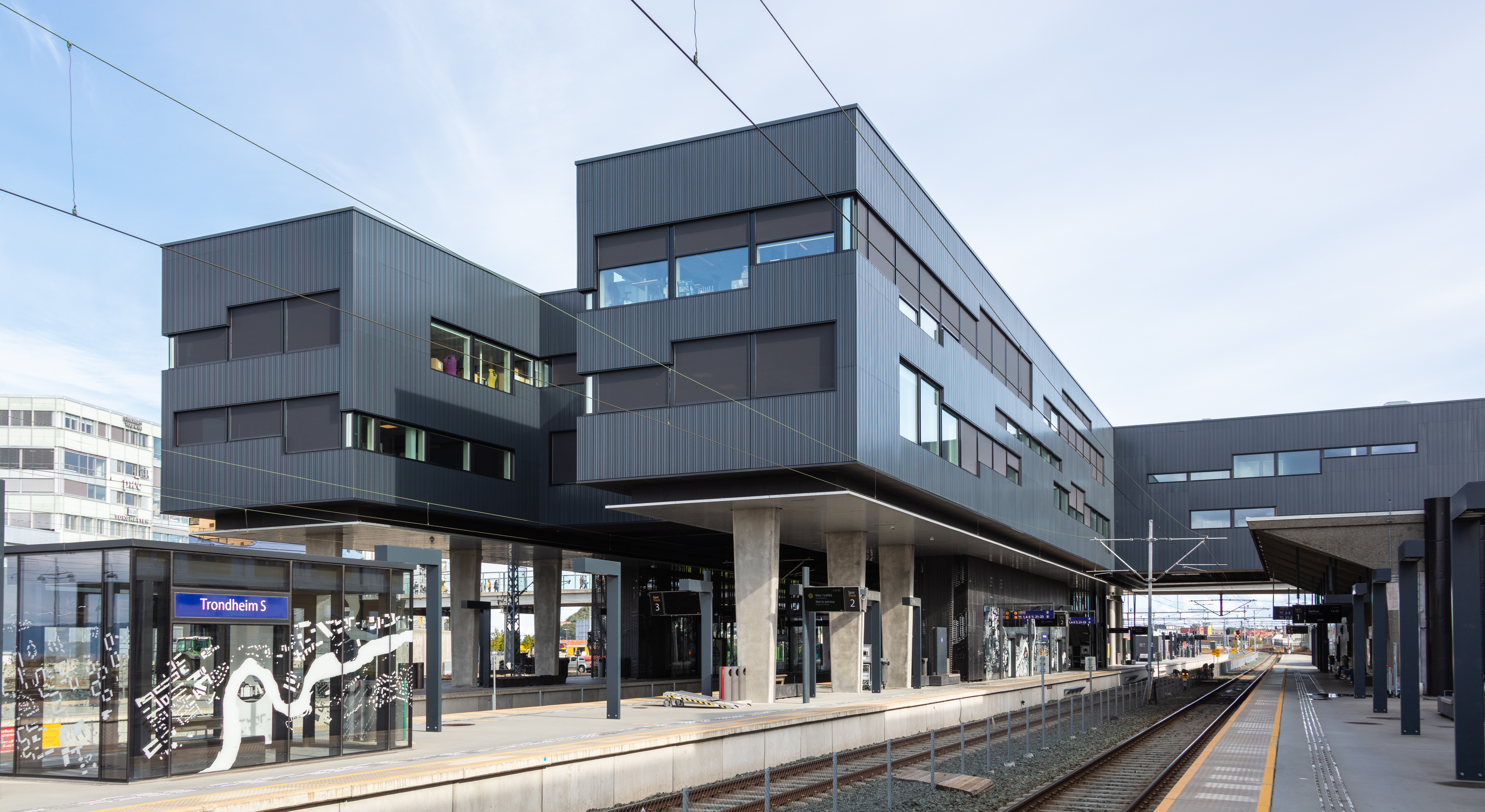
Railway station

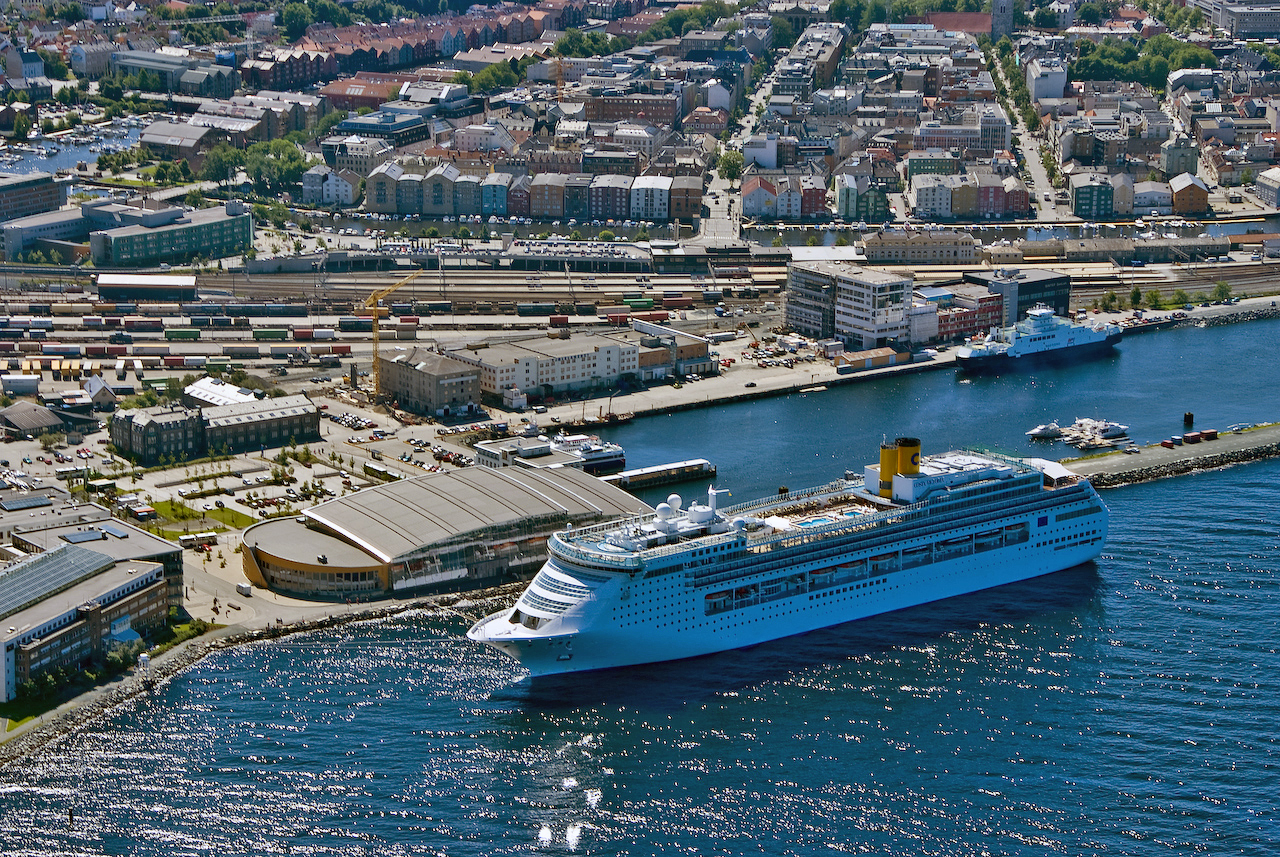
Costa Victoria in Trondheim

Trondheim has an international airport at Værnes in Stjørdal municipality, 32 kilometres (20 mi) away. It is Norway's fourth largest airport in terms of passenger traffic, with non-stop connections to cities such as London, Amsterdam, Copenhagen, and Stockholm, among others. The domestic route Trondheim – Oslo is among the busiest air routes in Europe with around 2 million passengers annually.

Trondheim boasts the world's only bicycle lift, Trampe.

=== Bus ===
The bus network, operated by AtB, runs throughout most of the city and its suburbs. A new metro line system went public 3 August 2019. The new transportation system covers the Trondheim area (Trondheim, Malvik, and Melhus). The three metro lines and the city lines that link the city across. The new public transport system becomes flexible, with buses running more often and accommodating more passengers. Fewer travelers must take a detour through the center of Trondheim, but relies more on bus transits.

In addition, the Nattbuss (Night Bus) service ensures transport for those enjoying nightlife in the city centre during the weekends. The Nattbus has other and expensive prices than ordinary buses.

=== Boats ===
The Coastal Express ships (Hurtigruten: Covering the Bergen–Kirkenes stretch of the coast) call at Trondheim, as do many cruise ships during the summer season. Every morning the Hurtigruten ships have one southbound and one northbound arrival and departure in Trondheim.

Since 1994 there is also a fast commuter boat service to Kristiansund (via Brekstad), the closest coastal city to the southwest; there is also a second commuter boat service to Vanvikan.

A car ferry route from the port of Flakk in the northwest of the municipality, connects Trondheim with Fosen.

=== Rail transport ===
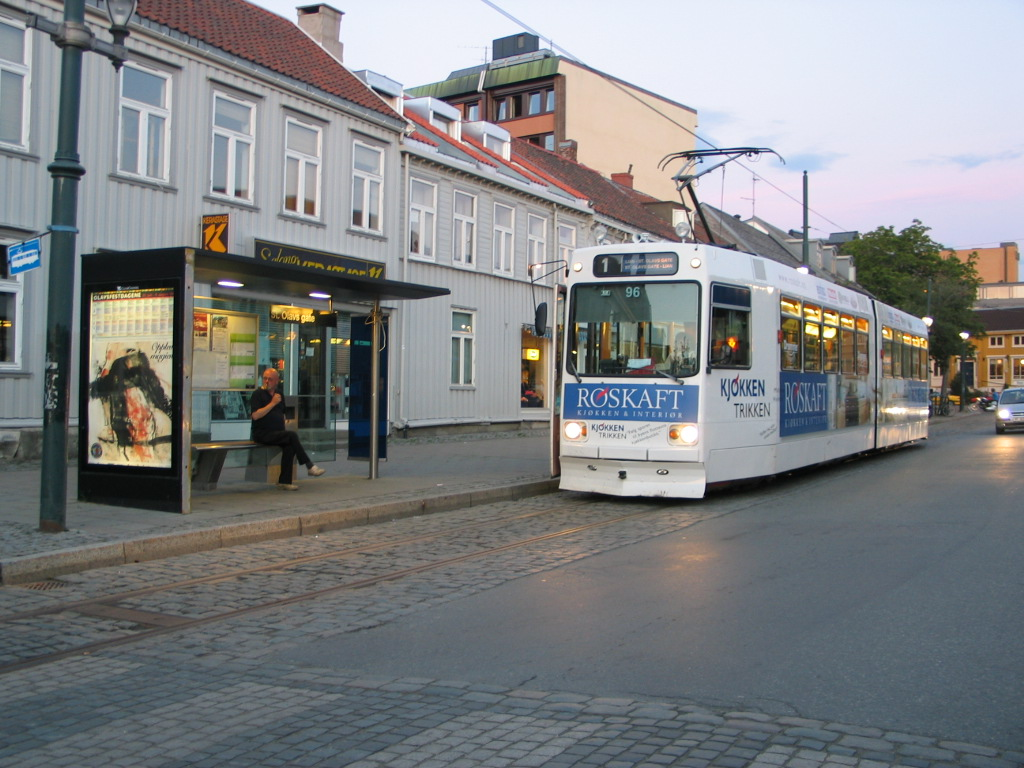
A tram in Trondheim in 2006

Major railway connections are the northbound Nordland Line, the eastbound Meråker Line to Åre and Östersund in Sweden, and two southbound connections to Oslo, the Røros Line and Dovre Line.

Trondheim also boasts the northernmost tramway in the world (since closure of Arkhangelsk tram system in 2004). The Gråkallen Line, the last remaining segment of the Trondheim Tramway, is an 8.8 km-long (5.5 mi) route (which is mostly single-track outside the innermost parts of the city; except the stretch between Breidablikk and Nordre Hoem stations) which runs from the city centre, through the Byåsen district, and up to Lian, in the large recreation area of Bymarka.

=== Roads ===
Norway's longest road, the European route E6 north-south motorway, passes through Trondheim mostly southeast of the major districts, except a long section between Tiller and Sluppen just north of Nidelva. The eastern terminus for European route E39 is at Klett narrowly within the municipality border, which heads west to Møre og Romsdal.

The later built National Road 706, Nordre avlastningsvei, is an alternate bypass that heads northwest instead of northeast at Sluppen, passing through Ila, Piren, and northern Strindheim before rejoining European Route E6 northeast of IKEA. This bypass is slower and has various roundabout crosses.

Various bridge projects over the Trondheim Fjord to replace the car ferry have been planned, but none have begun construction.

== Twin towns – sister cities ==
Trondheim is twinned with:

- Darmstadt, Germany (1968)
- Dunfermline, Scotland, United Kingdom (1945)
- Graz, Austria (1968)
- Klaksvík, Faroe Islands (1987)
- Kópavogur, Iceland (1946)
- Norrköping, Sweden (1946)
- Odense, Denmark (1946)
- Petah Tikva, Israel (1975)
- Ramallah, Palestine (2004)
- Split, Croatia (1956)
- Tampere, Finland (1946)
- Tiraspol, Moldova (1987)
- Vallejo, United States (1960)

== Business ==
- Lilleby smelteverk (1927–2002)

== Notable people ==
=== Public Service & public thinking ===
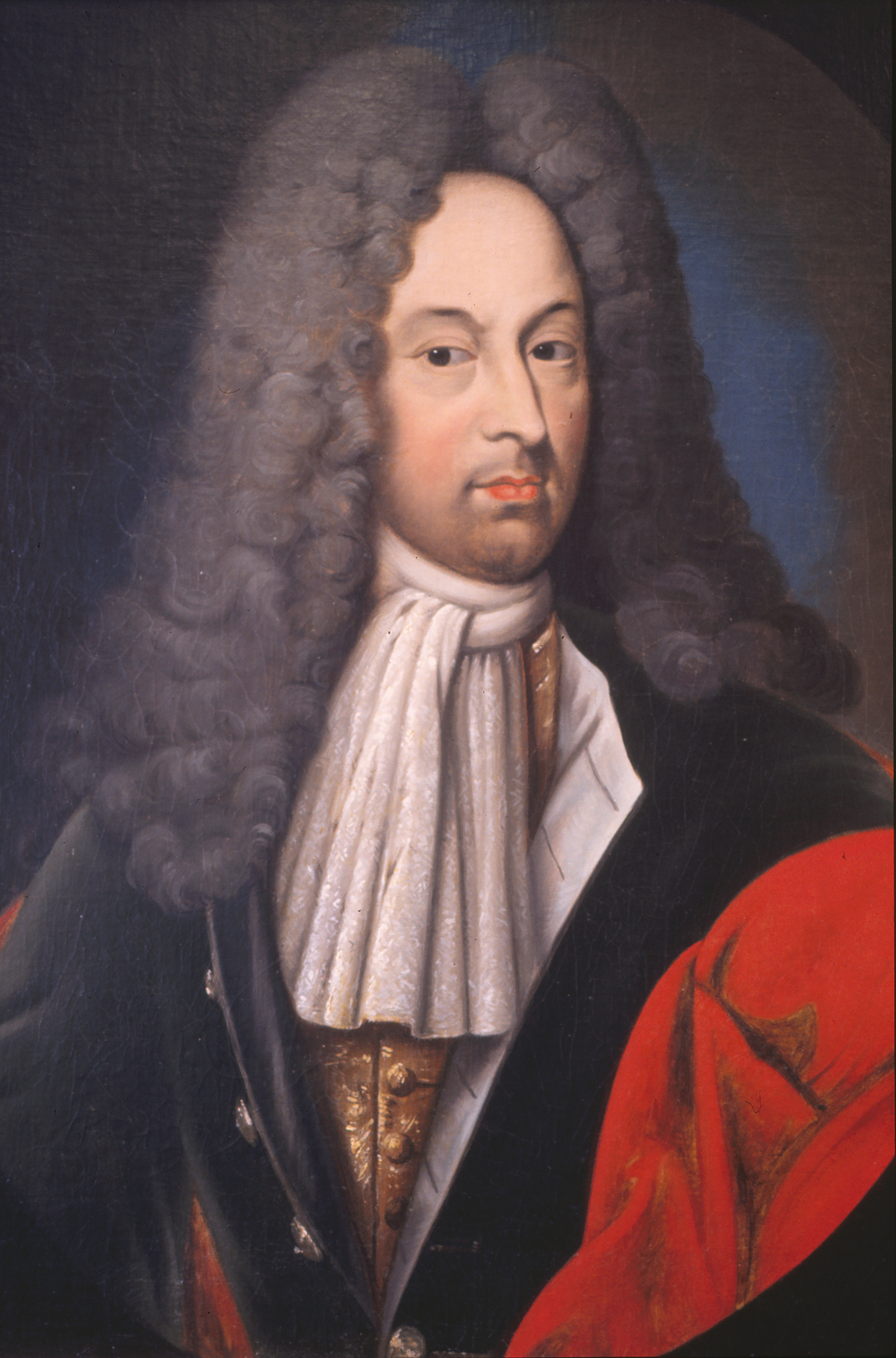
Albert Angell

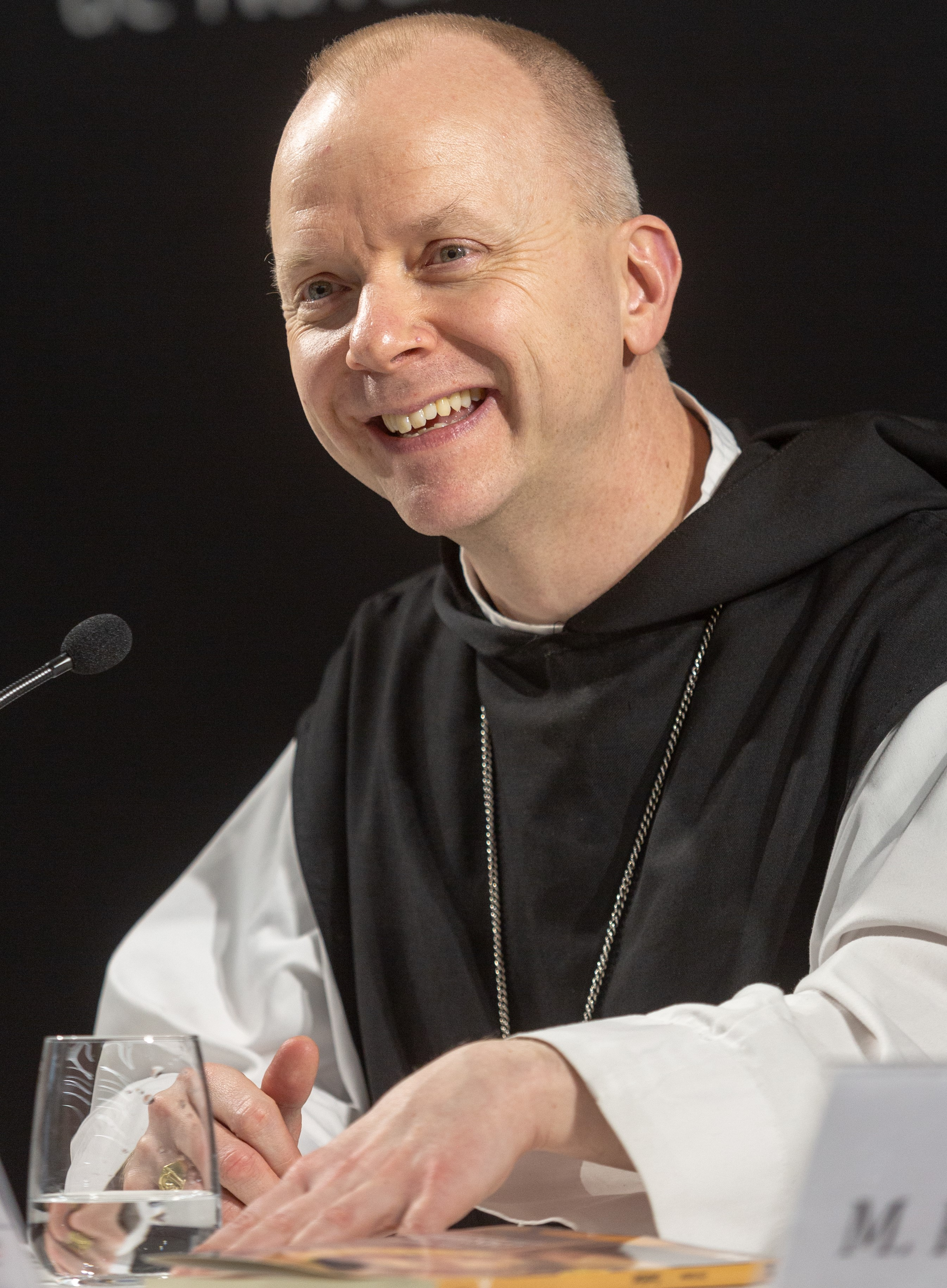
Erik Varden

- Lisbet Nypan (c. 1610–1670) an executed alleged Norwegian witch
- Ove Bjelke (1611–1674) nobleman, feudal lord and Chancellor of Norway
- Albert Angell (1660–1705) landowner, businessman and Mayor of Trondheim
- Peter Tordenskiold (1691–1720) a Dano-Norwegian nobleman and flag officer
- Frederik Due (1796–1873) Norwegian prime minister in Stockholm, 1841–1858
- Johan Thoning Owesen (1804–1881), shipowner, landowner and philanthropist
- Hans Gerhard Colbjørnsen Meldahl (1815–1877) politician and sixth Chief Justice of the Supreme Court of Norway, 1874–1877
- John Gunder North (1826–1872) ship builder in San Francisco
- Fritz Jenssen (1886–1966) banker and politician for Nasjonal Samling
- Bernt Ingvaldsen (1902–1985) politician, President of the Storting 1965–1972
- John Lyng (1905–1978) a politician, briefly Prime Minister of Norway in 1963
- Anne Margrethe Strømsheim (1914–2008) nurse and Norwegian resistance member
- Henrik Rogstad (1916–1945) a politician with Nasjonal Samling
- Kaare Langlete (1931–2009) military officer and Lord Chamberlain
- Per Arne Watle (born 1948) politician and CEO of Widerøe 1997–2008
- Georg Müller (1951-2015) RC Bishop of Trondheim until resignation following child sexual abuse, 2009
- Erik Varden (born 1974) RC Bishop of Trondheim

Stephen Zhao 1990- Notable Engineer and CTO

=== Science, education, mathematics ===
- Hilchen Sommerschild (1756–1831) pioneer educator
- Olaus Dons Schmidt (1895-1969) genealogist, fellow, Royal Norwegian Society of Sciences and Letters
- David Abrahamsen (1903–2002) forensic psychiatrist, psychoanalyst and author in the USA
- Knut Schmidt-Nielsen (1915–2007) animal physiologist
- Idun Reiten (1942-2025) mathematician

=== The Arts ===
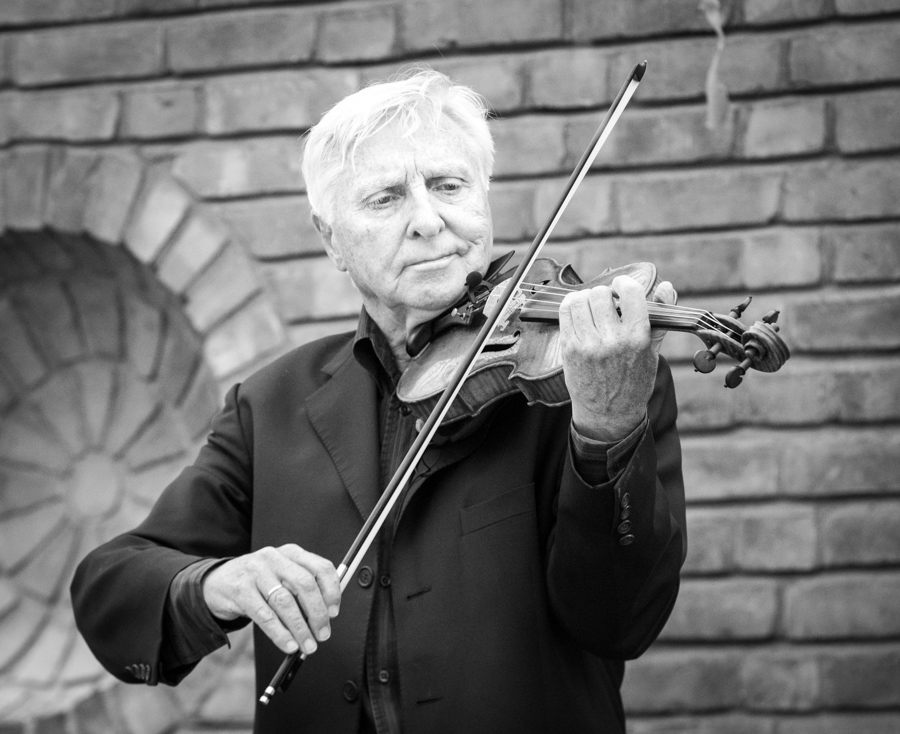
Arve Tellefsen, 2017

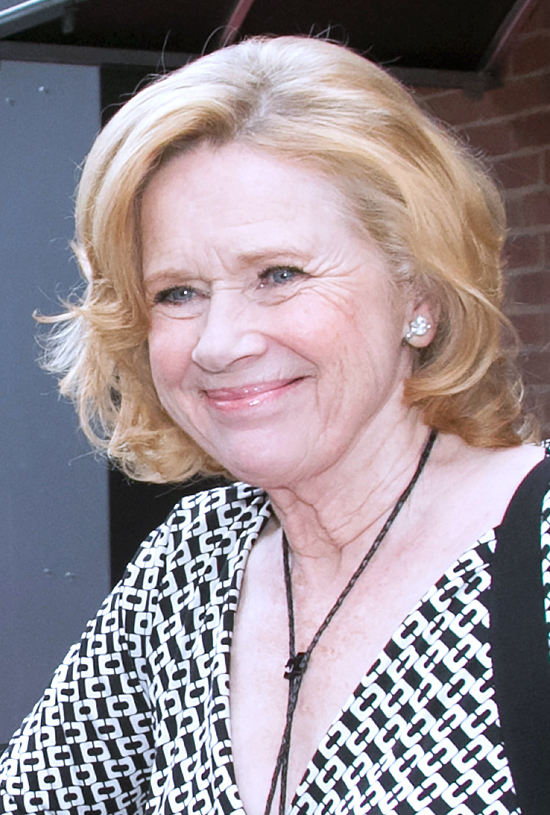
Liv Ullmann, 2014

- Carl Lorck (1829–1882) a Norwegian painter
- Anna Munch (1856–1932), novelist, playwright
- Knut Glomsaas (1863–1935) a military musician
- Tupsy Clement (1871–1959) a Skagen painter of landscapes
- Emmy Worm-Müller (1875–1950) silent film actress
- Arne Eggen (1881–1955) a classical composer and organist
- Bjarne Amdahl (1903–1968) pianist, composer and orchestra conductor
- Erling Viksjø (1910–1971) architect, exponent of architectural modernism
- Agnar Mykle (1915–1994) author, controversial figure in Norwegian literature
- Håkon Bleken (1929-2025) painter and graphic artist.
- Arve Tellefsen (born 1936) classical violinist
- Liv Ullmann (born 1938) actress and director
- Jan Erik Kongshaug (1944–2019) sound engineer, jazz guitarist and composer
- Sidsel Endresen (born 1952) singer, composer and actress
- Trond Halstein Moe (born 1954), operatic baritone
- Brit Dyrnes (born 1955), ceramist
- Geir Lysne (born 1965) a jazz musician and Big Band leader
- Øystein Baadsvik (born 1966) tuba soloist and chamber musician
- Merethe Trøan (born 1970) singer at the 1992 Eurovision Song Contest
- Elise Båtnes (born 1971) violinist, leader of the Oslo Philharmonic orchestra since 2006
- Mona Grudt (1971) Miss Universe 1990.
- Ingrid Lorentzen (born 1972) ballet dancer, artistic director of the Norwegian National Ballet
- Thomas Bergersen (born 1980) composer and multi-instrumentalist
- Georg Kajanus (born 1946) singer-songwriter, composer. Known from UK bands Sailor, Data and Noir.
- Casino Steel (born 1952) keyboardist, singer and songwriter. Known from UK band The Boys.
- Bernt Østhus (born 1970), lawyer, investor and photographer

=== Sports ===
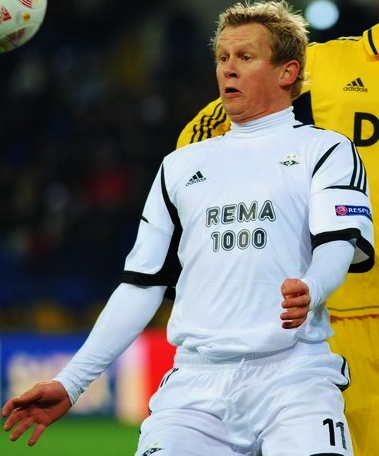
Steffen Iversen, 2012

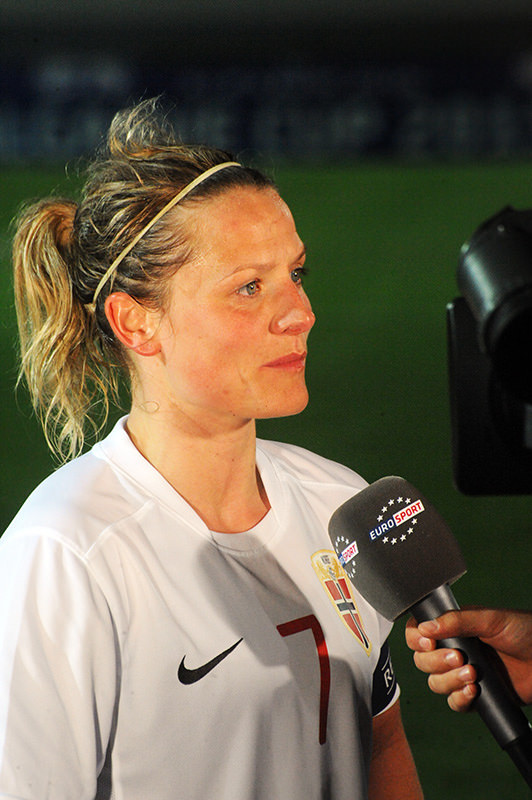
Trine Rønning, 2015

- Nils Uhlin Hansen (1919–1945) long jumper and Norwegian resistance member in WWII.
- Hjalmar Andersen (1923–2013) speed skater, triple gold medalist at the 1952 Winter Olympics
- Arnfinn Bergmann (1928–2011) ski jumper, gold medallist at the 1952 Winter Olympics
- Odd Iversen (1945–2014) a footballer with 282 club appearances and 45 caps for Norway
- Steffen Iversen (born 1976) footballer with 79 caps for Norway
- Martin Schanche (born 1945), racing driver and politician
- Jan Egil Storholt (born 1949) speed skater, gold medallist at the 1976 Winter Olympics
- Ingrid Kristiansen (born 1956) former long-distance runner
- Frode Rønning (born 1959) speed skater, bronze medallist at the 1980 Winter Olympics
- Rune Bratseth (born 1961) former footballer with 313 club appearances and 60 caps for Norway
- Atle Kvålsvoll (born 1962) cyclist and coach
- Roar Strand (born 1970) footballer with 464 club caps and 42 for Norway
- Bjørn Otto Bragstad (born 1971) footballer with 251 club appearances and 15 caps for Norway
- Gøril Kringen (born 1972) former footballer and coach
- Vegard Heggem (born 1975) former footballer with 20 caps for Norway
- Fredrik Winsnes (born 1975) former footballer with 353 club appearances and 19 caps for Norway
- Øystein Kvaal Østerbø (born 1981) orienteering and ski-orienteering competitor
- Trine Rønning (born 1982) a former captain of the Norway women's national football team
- Emil Hegle Svendsen (born 1985) biathlete, eight medals at Winter Olympics (four gold)
- Torstein Horgmo (born 1987) snowboarder
- Emil Weber Meek (born 1988) mixed martial artist
- Jørgen Gråbak (born 1991) Nordic combined skier, double gold at the 2014 Winter Olympics
- Sander Sagosen (born 1995) handball player
- Alexander Sørloth (born 1995) footballer
- Johannes Høsflot Klæbo (born 1996) a cross-country skier, triple gold medallist at the 2018 Winter Olympics
- Sverre Nypan (born 2006) footballer

== See also ==
- Estenstadmarka
- List of mayors of Trondheim
- Norwegian Society for Photobiology and Photomedicine (1983)
- Trondheim toll scheme
- Tyholt Tower
