= Tuller =

Tuller is a surname of German origin, with several different meanings. Notable people with the surname include:

- Annita Tuller (1910-1994), American mathematician
- Horst Tüller (1931-2001), German road and track cyclist
- James Tuller, American police superintendent
- Tamir Tuller, Israeli engineer, computer scientist, and systems and synthetic biologist

== See also ==
- Hotel Tuller, a hotel in Detroit, Michigan
- Tiller (disambiguation)
- Toller (disambiguation)
