= Tiller (disambiguation) =

A tiller is a lever to provide leverage for the helmsman to turn the rudder of a ship. Tiller may also refer to:

== Animals ==
- Tiller (horse) (born 1974), an American thoroughbred racehorse

== Archery ==
- Tiller, the stock of a crossbow
- Tiller, the difference between the limb-string distances measured where the limbs are attached to the riser (Recurve bow)
- Tiller, the device a bowyer (maker of bows) uses to see if the bending of the bow limbs is equal

== Mechanical ==
- Tiller (automobile), a steering device present on some very early automobiles before the steering wheel
- Tiller (aircraft), a small steering wheel in the cockpit of an aircraft used to steer the nose wheel
- Tiller truck, a fire truck with separate steering wheels for front and rear wheels
- Rotary tiller, a garden implement used for turning soil (or the person who operates such a device)

== Places ==
- Tiller, Norway, a neighborhood in Trondheim, Norway
- Tiller Municipality, a former municipality that is now part of Trondheim Municipality in Trøndelag County, Norway
- Tiller, Oregon, an unincorporated community in Douglas County, Oregon in the United States
- Tiller Ranger Station, a United States Forest Service compound in Oregon's Umpqua National Forest
- Tiller Church, a church in the city of Trondheim in Trøndelag county, Norway
- Tiller School, a non-profit charter school serving kindergarten through fifth grade in Beaufort, North Carolina

== Plants ==
- Tiller (botany), a stem produced by grass plants, and refers to all shoots that grow after the initial parent shoot grows from a seed

== People ==
- Andrew Tiller (born 1989), American football guard for the New Orleans Saints of the National Football League (NFL)
- Bill Tiller (born 1967), American computer game designer, writer, and artist
- Bjørn Tiller (born 1959), Norwegian chess player
- Bryson Tiller (born 1993), American singer, songwriter and rapper
- Carl Frode Tiller (born 1970), Norwegian author, historian and musician
- Chris Tiller (born 1978), former Major League Baseball umpire
- David Tiller (born 1958), former Australian rules footballer in the South Australian National Football League
- David Tiller (professor), Australian Professor of Medicine
- George Tiller (1941–2009), murdered American abortion doctor
- Gerald Tiller, a member of Dem Franchize Boyz rap group
- Henry Tiller (1914–1999), Norwegian boxer who competed in the 1936 Summer Olympics
- J. T. Tiller (born 1988), American professional basketball player
- Joe Tiller (1942–2017), American football player and coach
- John Tiller (1854–1925), musical theatre director
- John Tiller (priest) (born 1938), Anglican priest and author
- Kate Tiller, reader emerita in English local history at Kellogg College, University of Oxford
- Kelvin Tiller (born 1990), American mixed martial artist
- Mavis Tiller (1901–1989), New Zealand women's advocate, scientist and president of the National Council of Women of New Zealand
- Morgan Tiller (1918–1983), American football player and coach
- Nadja Tiller (1929–2023), Austrian actress
- Rasmus Tiller (born 1996), Norwegian cyclist
- Robert Tiller (born 1949), Canadian Thoroughbred racehorse trainer
- Sharon Tiller, American film maker who has numerous film and television credits as a writer, director, and producer
- Stephen Tiller (born 1987), Australian rules footballer for the Western Bulldogs of the AFL
- Terence Tiller (1916–1987), English poet and radio producer
- Tony Tiller (born 1981), former American football cornerback
- William A. Tiller, professor emeritus of materials science and engineering at Stanford University
- Tiller Girls, a popular dance troupe of the 1890s in England

== Sports ==
- Tiller IL, A Norwegian sports club

== Other ==
- Tiller Systems (software), a leading cloud-based iPad point of sale (POS) software company headquartered in Paris, France

== See also ==
- Tilley (disambiguation)
