= Byneset Municipality =

Former municipality in Trøndelag, Norway

Byneset Municipality Byneset herred
- Former municipality
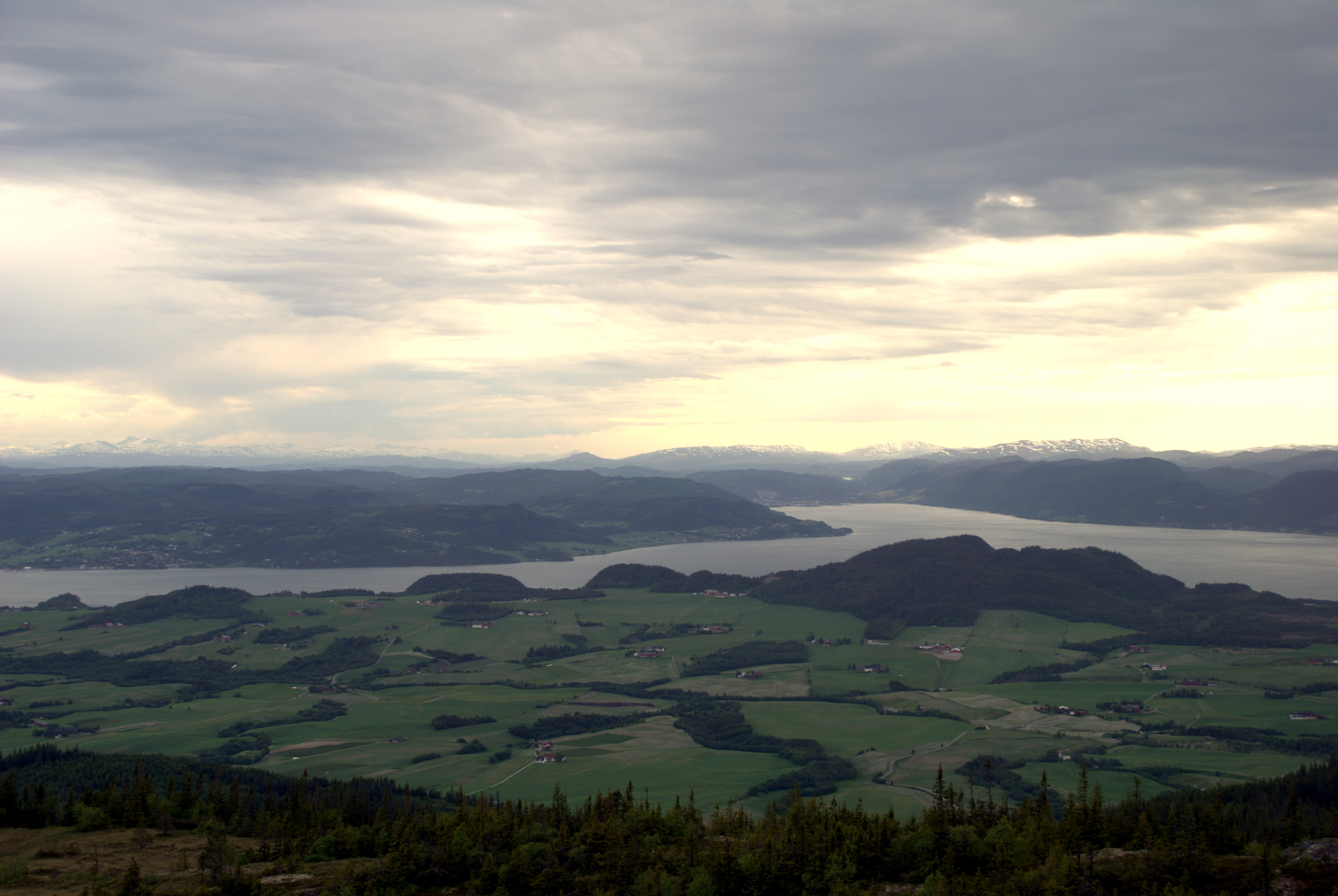
- View of southern Byneset, looking south

- Sør-Trøndelag within Norway

- Byneset within Sør-Trøndelag
- Coordinates: 63°22′34″N 10°08′10″E
- Country: Norway
- County: Sør-Trøndelag
- District: Trondheim Region
- Established: 1 Jan 1838
  - Created as: Formannskapsdistrikt
- Disestablished: 1 Jan 1964
  - Succeeded by: Trondheim Municipality
- Administrative centre: Spongdal

Government
  - Mayor (1960–1963): Kristen Løvseth (Sp)

Area (upon dissolution)
  - Total: 78.5 km^{2} (30.3 sq mi)
  - Rank: #548 in Norway
- Highest elevation: 565 m (1,854 ft)

Population (1963)
  - Total: 2,008
  - Rank: #437 in Norway
  - Density: 25.6/km^{2} (66/sq mi)
  - Change (10 years): ▲ +4.7%
- Demonym: Bynesing

Official language
  - Norwegian form: Neutral
- Time zone: UTC+01:00 (CET)
  - Summer (DST): UTC+02:00 (CEST)
- ISO 3166 code: NO-1655

Byneset is a former municipality in the old Sør-Trøndelag county in Norway. The 78.5-square-kilometre (30.3 sq mi) municipality existed from 1838 until its dissolution in 1964. The municipality of Byneset encompassed the western part of what is now Trondheim Municipality in Trøndelag county. Byneset Municipality was located along an arm of the Trondheimsfjord and it was separated from the city of Trondheim by the Bymarka recreation area. The local Byneset Church is one of the oldest stone churches in Norway. The largest village in Byneset was Spongdal which was the administrative centre of the municipality. Other villages included Byneset and Langørjan.

Prior to its dissolution in 1964, the 78.5-square-kilometre (30.3 sq mi) municipality was the 548th largest by area out of the 689 municipalities in Norway. Byneset Municipality was the 437th most populous municipality in Norway with a population of about 2,008. The municipality's population density was 25.6 inhabitants per square kilometre (66/sq mi) and its population had increased by 4.7% over the previous 10-year period.

== General information ==
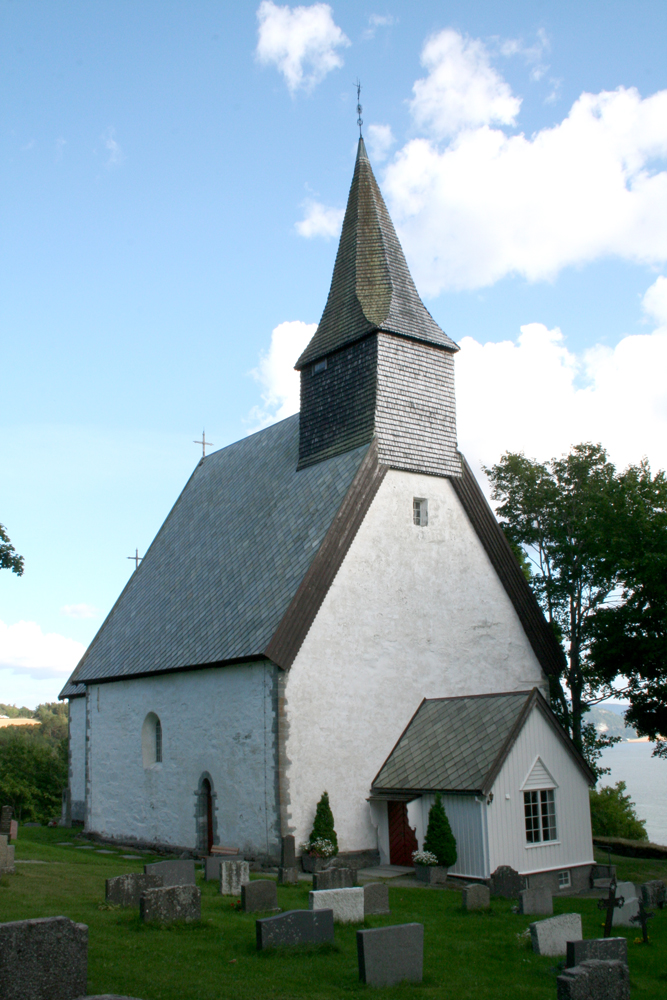
Byneset Church

The municipality of Byneset was established on 1 January 1838 (see formannskapsdistrikt law). According to the 1835 census, there were 2,143 people living in the area that became Byneset Municipality. In 1855, the part of the municipality located south of the Gaulosen bay (population: 841) was separated to become the new Buvik Municipality. This left Byneset Municipality with a population of 2,109.

During the 1960s, there were many municipal mergers across Norway due to the work of the Schei Committee. On 1 January 1964, there was a major municipal merger: Byneset Municipality (population: 2,049), Leinstrand Municipality (population: 4,193), Strinda Municipality (population: 44,600), Tiller Municipality (population: 3,595), and the city of Trondheim (population: 56,982) were merged to form the new Trondheim Municipality which would have a total population of 111,419.

=== Name ===
The municipality is named Bynes or Byneset since this has been the name for the area since the mid-1400s. The first element is the name of the old By farm (Old Norse: býr) which means "farm". The last element is the old name (1400s and earlier) for the medieval parish for this area, Nes, which is the word for "headland" (because this area is located on a headland between the Trondheimsfjorden and Gaulosen fjord.

=== Churches ===
The Church of Norway had one parish (sokn) within Byneset Municipality. At the time of the municipal dissolution, it was part of the Byneset prestegjeld and the Heimdal prosti (deanery) in the Diocese of Nidaros.

Churches in Byneset Municipality
Parish (sokn)	Church name	Location of the church	Year built
Byneset	Byneset Church	Byneset	c. 1150

== Geography ==
The municipality was located on the Byneset peninsula, just west of the city of Trondheim. It was bordered by Trondheim Municipality, Strinda Municipality, and Leinstrand Municipality to the east. The Trondheimsfjorden was to the north, Orkdalsfjorden to the west, and the Gaulosen bay to the south. The highest point in the municipality was the 565-metre (1,854 ft) tall mountain Storheia.

== Government ==
While it existed, Byneset Municipality was responsible for primary education (through 10th grade), outpatient health services, senior citizen services, welfare and other social services, zoning, economic development, and municipal roads and utilities. The municipality was governed by a municipal council of directly elected representatives. The mayor was indirectly elected by a vote of the municipal council. The municipality was under the jurisdiction of the Frostating Court of Appeal.

=== Municipal council ===
The municipal council (Herredsstyre) of Byneset Municipality was made up of 17 representatives that were elected to four year terms. The tables below show the historical composition of the council by political party.

Byneset herredsstyre 1959–1963
Party name (in Norwegian)	Number of representatives
Labour Party (Arbeiderpartiet)	4
Conservative Party (Høyre)	2
Christian Democratic Party (Kristelig Folkeparti)	2
Centre Party (Senterpartiet)	9
Total number of members:	17

Byneset herredsstyre 1955–1959
Party name (in Norwegian)	Number of representatives
Labour Party (Arbeiderpartiet)	4
Conservative Party (Høyre)	1
Christian Democratic Party (Kristelig Folkeparti)	3
Farmers' Party (Bondepartiet)	9
Total number of members:	17

Byneset herredsstyre 1951–1955
Party name (in Norwegian)	Number of representatives
Labour Party (Arbeiderpartiet)	3
Conservative Party (Høyre)	1
Christian Democratic Party (Kristelig Folkeparti)	3
Farmers' Party (Bondepartiet)	7
Local List(s) (Lokale lister)	2
Total number of members:	16

Byneset herredsstyre 1947–1951
Party name (in Norwegian)	Number of representatives
Labour Party (Arbeiderpartiet)	3
Christian Democratic Party (Kristelig Folkeparti)	2
Farmers' Party (Bondepartiet)	11
Total number of members:	16

Byneset herredsstyre 1945–1947
Party name (in Norwegian)	Number of representatives
Labour Party (Arbeiderpartiet)	4
Farmers' Party (Bondepartiet)	9
Local List(s) (Lokale lister)	3
Total number of members:	16

Byneset herredsstyre 1937–1941*
Party name (in Norwegian)	Number of representatives
Labour Party (Arbeiderpartiet)	3
Joint List(s) of Non-Socialist Parties (Borgerlige Felleslister)	13
Total number of members:	16
Note: Due to the German occupation of Norway during World War II, no elections were held for new municipal councils until after the war ended in 1945.

=== Mayors ===
The mayor (Norwegian: ordfører) of Byneset Municipality was the political leader of the municipality and the chairperson of the municipal council. Here is a list of people who held this position:

- 1838–1841: Christian Petersen
- 1842–1845: Christen Larsen Rye
- 1846–1849: Johan Lausen Koren Dahl
- 1850–1851: Christen Monsen Hangeraas
- 1852–1852: Lars Ingebretsen Skjøstad
- 1852–1859: Christen Larsen Rye
- 1860–1863: Lars Christensen Gaustad
- 1864–1871: Anders Olsen Vorset
- 1872–1873: Ingebrigt Andersen Brendsel
- 1874–1877: Ole Knutsen Haugan
- 1878–1887: Lars Christensen Gaustad (V)
- 1888–1893: Anders Larsen Bodsberg
- 1894–1897: Ole Larsen Risstad (H)
- 1898–1898: Ole Larsen Engen (V)
- 1899–1901: Ole Larsen Risstad (H)
- 1902–1907: Ole Gudmundsen Frøseth (V)
- 1908–1919: Ole Larsen Engen (V)
- 1920–1925: Ole Knutsen Rye (LL)
- 1926–1934: Axel Høyem (Bp)
- 1935–1940: Elling Larsen Opland (Bp)
- 1941–1945: Anders Skogstad (NS)
- 1945–1947: Elling Larsen Opland (Bp)
- 1948–1953: Lars Olsen Gaustad (Bp)
- 1954–1959: Kristoffer Rye (Bp)
- 1960–1963: Kristen Løvseth (Bp)

== See also ==
- List of former municipalities of Norway
