= Grunge (disambiguation) =

Grunge is a genre of rock music.

Grunge may also refer to:

- Grunge (comics), a teenage comic book super-hero and a member of Gen^{13}
- Grunge.com, a website on weird history, entertainment, science, and sports
- Grunge fashion, a fashion trend popular in the 1990s associated with the genre of music
- Johnny Grunge, a ring name of professional wrestler Michael Lynn Durham (1965–2006)
- Grunge, Norway, a village in Vinje municipality in Telemark, Norway

== See also ==
- Grunge lit, an Australian literary genre
- Grunge speak, a hoax reported by the New York Times
- Post-grunge, a music genre
