= Tiller Municipality =

Former municipality in Trøndelag, Norway

Tiller Municipality Tiller herred
- Former municipality
- Tilder herred (historic name)
- Sør-Trøndelag within Norway

- Tiller within Sør-Trøndelag
- Coordinates: 63°20′34″N 10°25′34″E
- Country: Norway
- County: Sør-Trøndelag
- District: Trondheim Region
- Established: 1 Jan 1899
  - Preceded by: Klæbu Municipality
- Disestablished: 1 Jan 1964
  - Succeeded by: Trondheim Municipality
- Administrative centre: Heimdal

Government
  - Mayor (1963–1963): Bernhard Gylland (Ap)

Area (upon dissolution)
  - Total: 23.7 km^{2} (9.2 sq mi)
  - Rank: #622 in Norway
- Highest elevation: 379 m (1,243 ft)

Population (1963)
  - Total: 3,328
  - Rank: #274 in Norway
  - Density: 140.4/km^{2} (364/sq mi)
  - Change (10 years): ▲ +75.3%
- Demonym: Tillerbygg

Official language
  - Norwegian form: Bokmål
- Time zone: UTC+01:00 (CET)
  - Summer (DST): UTC+02:00 (CEST)
- ISO 3166 code: NO-1661

Tiller is a former municipality in the old Sør-Trøndelag county, Norway. The 23.7-square-kilometre (9.2 sq mi) municipality of Tiller existed from 1899 until its dissolution in 1964. The municipality encompassed part of the south-central part of what is now Trondheim Municipality in Trøndelag county. The municipality was generally located between the river Nidelva in the east and the Dovrebanen railway line in the west. The administrative centre was located at Heimdal, on the western edge of the municipality. The local Tiller Church was built shortly after the creation of the municipality (1901) to serve its residents.

Prior to its dissolution in 1963, the 23.7-square-kilometre (9.2 sq mi) municipality was the 622nd largest by area out of the 689 municipalities in Norway. Tiller Municipality was the 274th most populous municipality in Norway with a population of about 3,328. The municipality's population density was 140.4 inhabitants per square kilometre (364/sq mi) and its population had increased by 75.3% over the previous 10-year period.

== General information ==
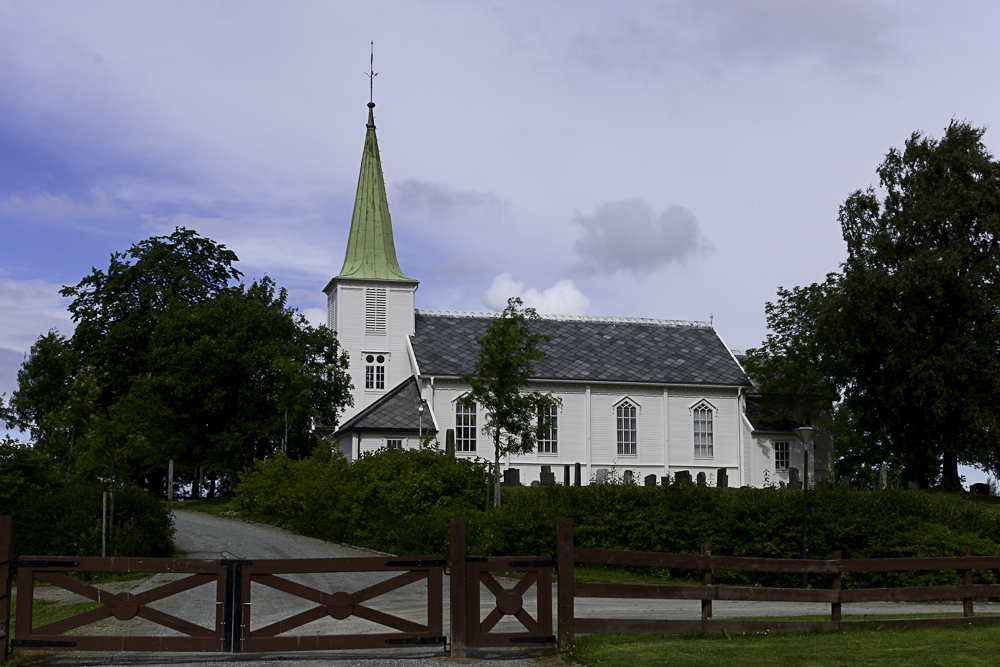
Tiller Church

The municipality of Tiller was established on 1 January 1899 when the northwestern part of Klæbu Municipality was split off to form the new Tiller Municipality. Initially, Tiller Municipality had a population of 533.

During the 1960s, there were many municipal mergers across Norway due to the work of the Schei Committee. On 1 January 1964, Byneset Municipality (population: 2,049), Leinstrand Municipality (population: 4,193), Strinda Municipality (population: 44,600), Tiller Municipality (population: 3,595), and the city of Trondheim (population: 56,982) were merged to form the new urban Trondheim Municipality which would have a total population of 111,419.

=== Name ===
The municipality (originally the parish) is named after the old Tilder farm (Old Norse: Tildrar) since the first Tiller Church was built there. The name is the plural form of the word tildr which was probably the old name for a local river that flows into the large river Nidelva. The meaning of the name is uncertain. Historically, the name of the municipality was spelled Tilder. On 3 November 1917, a royal resolution changed the spelling of the name of the municipality to Tiller.

=== Churches ===
The Church of Norway had one parish (sokn) within Tiller Municipality. At the time of the municipal dissolution, it was part of the Klæbu prestegjeld and the Heimdal prosti (deanery) in the Diocese of Nidaros.

Churches in Tiller Municipality
Parish (sokn)	Church name	Location of the church	Year built
Tiller	Tiller Church	Tiller	1901

== Geography ==
The municipality was located south of the city of Trondheim. It was bordered by Leinstrand Municipality to the west, Strinda Municipality to the north and east, Klæbu Municipality to the southeast, and Melhus Municipality to the south. The highest point in the municipality was the 379-metre (1,243 ft) tall mountain Svartåsen, on the southern border with Melhus Municipality.

== Government ==
While it existed, Tiller Municipality was responsible for primary education (through 10th grade), outpatient health services, senior citizen services, welfare and other social services, zoning, economic development, and municipal roads and utilities. The municipality was governed by a municipal council of directly elected representatives. The mayor was indirectly elected by a vote of the municipal council. The municipality was under the jurisdiction of the Frostating Court of Appeal.

=== Municipal council ===
The municipal council (Herredsstyre) of Tiller was made up of 19 representatives that were elected to four year terms. The tables below show the historical composition of the council by political party.

Tiller herredsstyre 1959–1963
Party name (in Norwegian)	Number of representatives
Labour Party (Arbeiderpartiet)	12
Conservative Party (Høyre)	2
Communist Party (Kommunistiske Parti)	1
Christian Democratic Party (Kristelig Folkeparti)	2
Centre Party (Senterpartiet)	1
Liberal Party (Venstre)	1
Total number of members:	19

Tiller herredsstyre 1955–1959
Party name (in Norwegian)	Number of representatives
Labour Party (Arbeiderpartiet)	11
Communist Party (Kommunistiske Parti)	2
Christian Democratic Party (Kristelig Folkeparti)	2
Liberal Party (Venstre)	1
Joint List(s) of Non-Socialist Parties (Borgerlige Felleslister)	3
Total number of members:	19

Tiller herredsstyre 1951–1955
Party name (in Norwegian)	Number of representatives
Labour Party (Arbeiderpartiet)	9
Communist Party (Kommunistiske Parti)	1
Joint list of the Conservative Party (Høyre) and the Farmers' Party (Bondepartiet)	3
Joint list of the Liberal Party (Venstre) and Christian Democratic Party (Kristelig Folkeparti)	3
Total number of members:	16

Tiller herredsstyre 1947–1951
Party name (in Norwegian)	Number of representatives
Labour Party (Arbeiderpartiet)	6
Communist Party (Kommunistiske Parti)	1
Liberal Party (Venstre)	1
Joint List(s) of Non-Socialist Parties (Borgerlige Felleslister)	3
Local List(s) (Lokale lister)	1
Total number of members:	12

Tiller herredsstyre 1945–1947
Party name (in Norwegian)	Number of representatives
Labour Party (Arbeiderpartiet)	5
Communist Party (Kommunistiske Parti)	1
Joint List(s) of Non-Socialist Parties (Borgerlige Felleslister)	4
Local List(s) (Lokale lister)	2
Total number of members:	12

Tiller herredsstyre 1937–1941*
Party name (in Norwegian)	Number of representatives
Labour Party (Arbeiderpartiet)	6
Joint List(s) of Non-Socialist Parties (Borgerlige Felleslister)	6
Total number of members:	12
Note: Due to the German occupation of Norway during World War II, no elections were held for new municipal councils until after the war ended in 1945.

=== Mayors ===
The mayor (Norwegian: ordfører) of Tiller Municipality was the political leader of the municipality and the chairperson of the municipal council. The following people have held this position:

- 1899–1904: Sivert Thonstad (H)
- 1905–1910: Arnt Solberg (V)
- 1911–1913: Johan Tiller (LL)
- 1914–1916: Arnt Solberg (V)
- 1917–1919: Johan Tiller (LL)
- 1920–1922: Mentz Skjetne (Ap)
- 1923–1924: Alf Godager (LL)
- 1924–1928: John Thonstad (LL)
- 1928–1928: Carl Schjetnan (Ap)
- 1929–1931: Eyvind Løkken (V)
- 1932–1932: Gjerlov Thonstad (Ap)
- 1932–1933: Johan Tiller (LL)
- 1935–1937: Eyvind Løkken (V)
- 1938–1941: Arne Solberg (LL)
- 1941–1945: Harald Hansen (NS)
- 1945–1945: Arne Solberg (LL)
- 1945–1945: John Bjørgum (Ap)
- 1946–1947: Martin L. Kregnes (V)
- 1948–1963: Gjerlov Thonstad (Ap)
- 1963–1963: Bernhard Gylland (Ap)

== See also ==
- List of former municipalities of Norway
