= Kolstad Church =

Church in Trøndelag, Norway

- Kolstad kirke
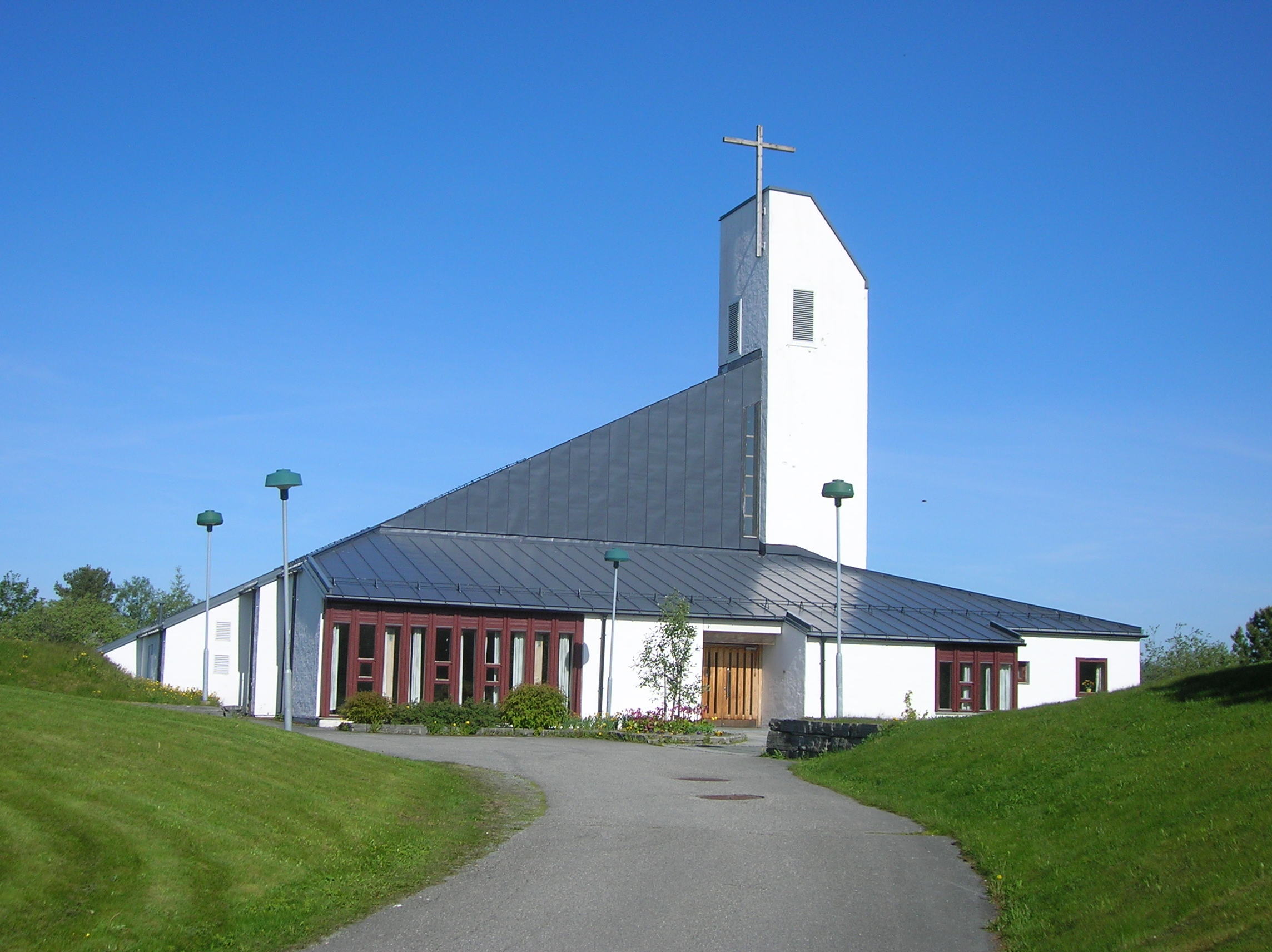
- View of the church
- Kolstad Church
- 63.364696255°N 10.3465037389°E
- Location: Trondheim Municipality, Trøndelag
- Country: Norway
- Denomination: Church of Norway
- Churchmanship: Evangelical Lutheran

History
- Status: Parish church
- Founded: 1986
- Consecrated: 4 May 1986

Architecture
- Functional status: Active
- Architect: Nils Henrik Eggen
- Architectural type: Rectangular
- Style: Modern
- Completed: 1986 (40 years ago)

Specifications
- Capacity: 460
- Materials: Concrete

Administration
- Diocese: Nidaros bispedømme
- Deanery: Heimdal og Byåsen prosti
- Parish: Kolstad
- Norwegian Cultural Heritage Site
- Type: Church
- Status: Not protected
- ID: 84806

Kolstad Church (Norwegian: Kolstad kirke) is a parish church of the Church of Norway in Trondheim Municipality in Trøndelag county, Norway. It is located in the Kolstad area of the city of Trondheim, about 1.5 kilometres (0.93 mi) from the nearby Heimdal Church. It is the church for the Kolstad parish which is part of the Heimdal og Byåsen prosti (deanery) in the Diocese of Nidaros. The modern, concrete church was built in a rectangular design in 1986 using plans drawn up by the architect Nils Henrik Eggen. The church seats about 460 people.

== History ==
The white, concrete building was built from 1985 to 1986 by the lead contractor Ole Stjern. The new building was consecrated on 4 May 1986 by Bishop Kristen Kyrre Bremer. The altarpiece (from 1989) is made by Sigmund Lystrup out of old beams from the old Grunge Church in Vinje Municipality in Telemark county.

== See also ==
- List of churches in Nidaros
