= Ringvål =

Village in Trondheim Municipality, Norway

- Village
- Interactive map of Ringvål
- Location within Trøndelag Location within Norway
- Coordinates: 63.3556°N 10.2597°E
- Country: Norway
- Region: Central Norway
- County: Trøndelag
- Municipality: Trondheim Municipality
- Borough: Heimdal

Area
  - Total: 0.19 km^{2} (0.073 sq mi)
- Elevation: 172 m (564 ft)

Population (2024)
  - Total: 448
  - Density: 2,358/km^{2} (6,110/sq mi)
- Time zone: UTC+01:00 (CET)
  - Summer (DST): UTC+02:00 (CEST)
- Post Code: 7089 Heimdal

Ringvål is a village in Trondheim Municipality in Trøndelag county, Norway. The village is located in the borough of Heimdal, at the mouth of the Gaula River between the urban areas of Heimdal and Spongdal.

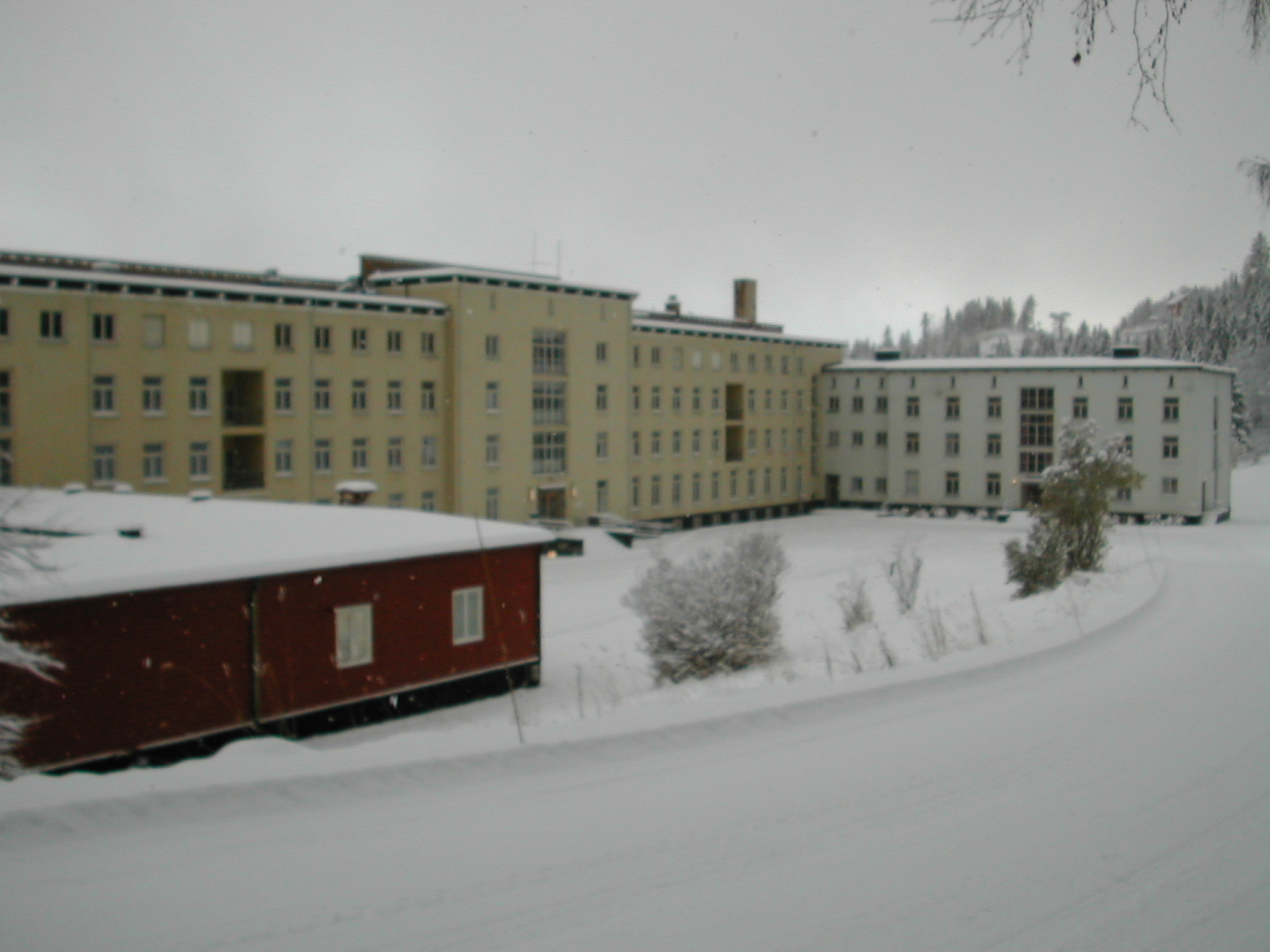
Old sanatorium in Ringvål

The 0.19-square-kilometre (47-acre) village has a population (2024) of 448 and a population density of 2,358 inhabitants per square kilometre (6,110/sq mi).
