= Spongdal =

Village in Trondheim Municipality, Norway

- Village
- Interactive map of Spongdal
- Location within Trøndelag Location within Norway
- Coordinates: 63.3556°N 10.1665°E
- Country: Norway
- Region: Central Norway
- County: Trøndelag
- Municipality: Trondheim Municipality
- Borough: Heimdal

Area
  - Total: 0.28 km^{2} (0.11 sq mi)
- Elevation: 104 m (341 ft)

Population (2024)
  - Total: 498
  - Density: 1,779/km^{2} (4,610/sq mi)
- Time zone: UTC+01:00 (CET)
  - Summer (DST): UTC+02:00 (CEST)
- Post Code: 7074 Spongdal

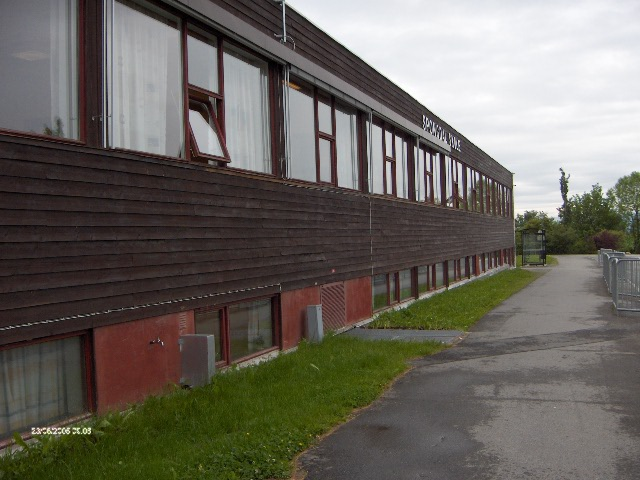
Spongdal School

Spongdal is a village in Trondheim Municipality in Trøndelag county, Norway. It is the largest village in the Byneset area in Heimdal borough. It is located between the villages of Langørjan and Ringvål. The Byneset Church lies about 2.5 kilometres (1.6 mi) west of the village of Spongdal. It sits right next to the main bus stop in Spongdal.

The picture of the school is outdated. It was abandoned in 2015 because black mold was found inside. Rarely it's used for military or police exercises.

The school is mostly still intact except for the windows, and it has been vandalised with graffiti. So far the commune has chosen not to tear the building down.

The 0.28-square-kilometre (69-acre) village has a population (2024) of 498 and a population density of 1,779 inhabitants per square kilometre (4,610/sq mi).
