= Langørjan =

Village in Trondheim Municipality, Norway

Langørjan Rye
- Village
- Interactive map of Langørjan
- Location within Trøndelag Location within Norway
- Coordinates: 63.4171°N 10.1358°E
- Country: Norway
- Region: Central Norway
- County: Trøndelag
- Municipality: Trondheim Municipality
- Borough: Heimdal

Area
  - Total: 0.35 km^{2} (0.14 sq mi)
- Elevation: 103 m (338 ft)

Population (2024)
  - Total: 620
  - Density: 1,771/km^{2} (4,590/sq mi)
- Time zone: UTC+01:00 (CET)
  - Summer (DST): UTC+02:00 (CEST)
- Post Code: 7070 Bosberg

Langørjan or Rye is a village in Trondheim Municipality in Trøndelag county, Norway. The village is located in the borough of Heimdal in the Byneset district about 12 kilometres (7.5 mi) west of the city of Trondheim and about 7.5 kilometres (4.7 mi) north of the village of Spongdal.

The 0.35-square-kilometre (86-acre) village has a population (2024) of 620 and a population density of 1,771 inhabitants per square kilometre (4,590/sq mi).
