= Leinstrand Municipality =

Former municipality in Trøndelag, Norway

Leinstrand Municipality Leinstrand herred
- Former municipality
- Leinstranden herred (historic name)
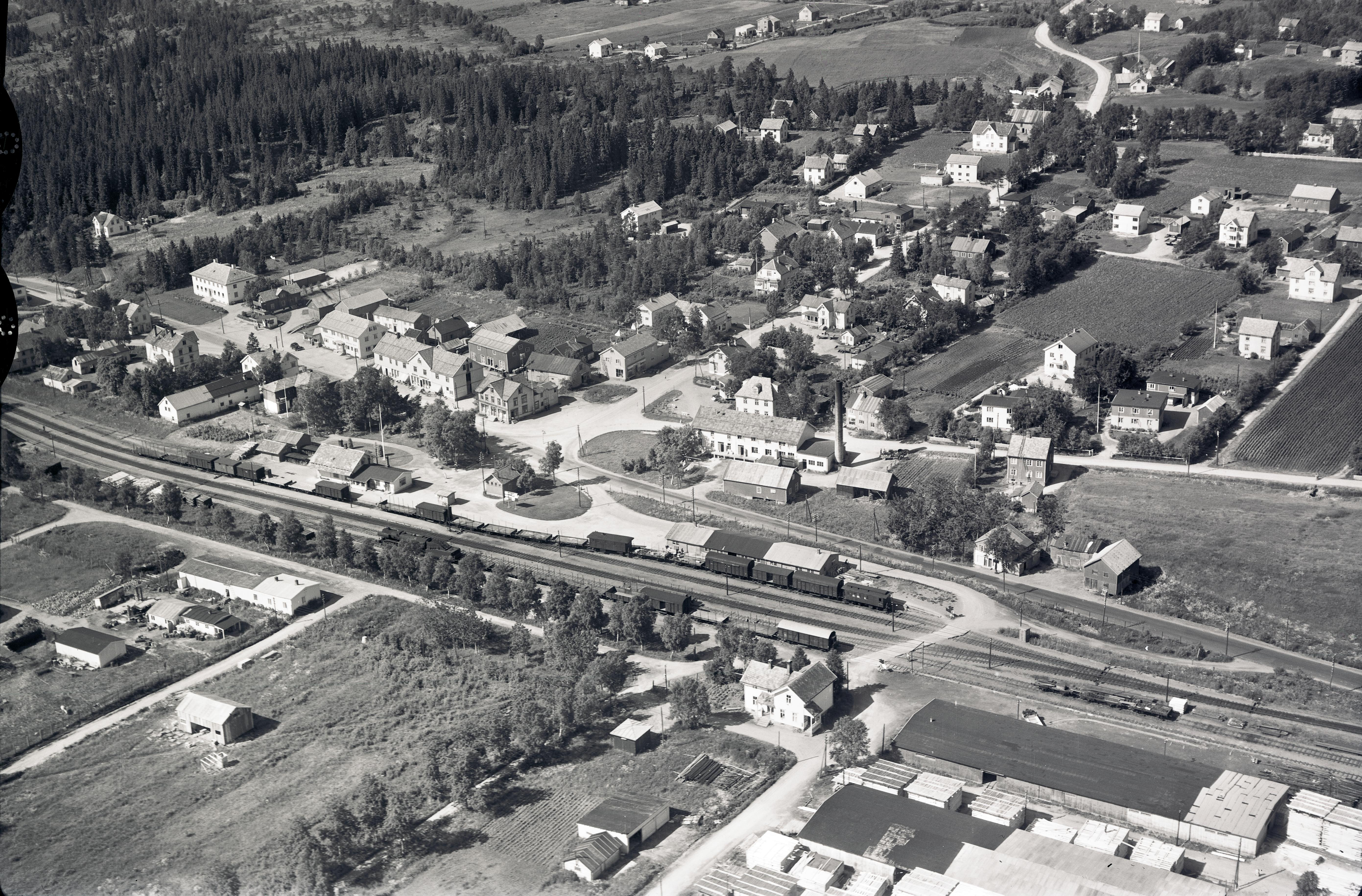
- View of Heimdal in 1952

- Sør-Trøndelag within Norway

- Leinstrand within Sør-Trøndelag
- Coordinates: 63°19′12″N 10°17′52″E
- Country: Norway
- County: Sør-Trøndelag
- District: Trondheim Region
- Established: 1 Jan 1838
  - Created as: Formannskapsdistrikt
- Disestablished: 1 Jan 1964
  - Succeeded by: Trondheim Municipality
- Administrative centre: Heimdal

Government
  - Mayor (1960–1963): Ivar Sakshaug (Sp)

Area (upon dissolution)
  - Total: 45.7 km^{2} (17.6 sq mi)
  - Rank: #591 in Norway
- Highest elevation: 291 m (955 ft)

Population (1963)
  - Total: 4,011
  - Rank: #215 in Norway
  - Density: 87.8/km^{2} (227/sq mi)
  - Change (10 years): ▲ +31.4%
- Demonym: Leinstranding

Official language
  - Norwegian form: Neutral
- Time zone: UTC+01:00 (CET)
  - Summer (DST): UTC+02:00 (CEST)
- ISO 3166 code: NO-1654

Leinstrand is a former municipality in the old Sør-Trøndelag county, Norway. The 46-square-kilometre (18 sq mi) municipality existed from 1838 until its dissolution in 1964. Leinstrand Municipality encompassed the south-central part of what is now Trondheim Municipality in Trøndelag county. The administrative centre was located in the village of Heimdal, just west of the border with Tiller Municipality. The local Leinstrand Church was built in 1673.

Prior to its dissolution in 1963, the 45.7-square-kilometre (17.6 sq mi) municipality was the 591st largest by area out of the 689 municipalities in Norway. Leinstrand Municipality was the 215th most populous municipality in Norway with a population of about 4,011. The municipality's population density was 87.8 inhabitants per square kilometre (227/sq mi) and its population had increased by 31.4% over the previous 10-year period.

== General information ==
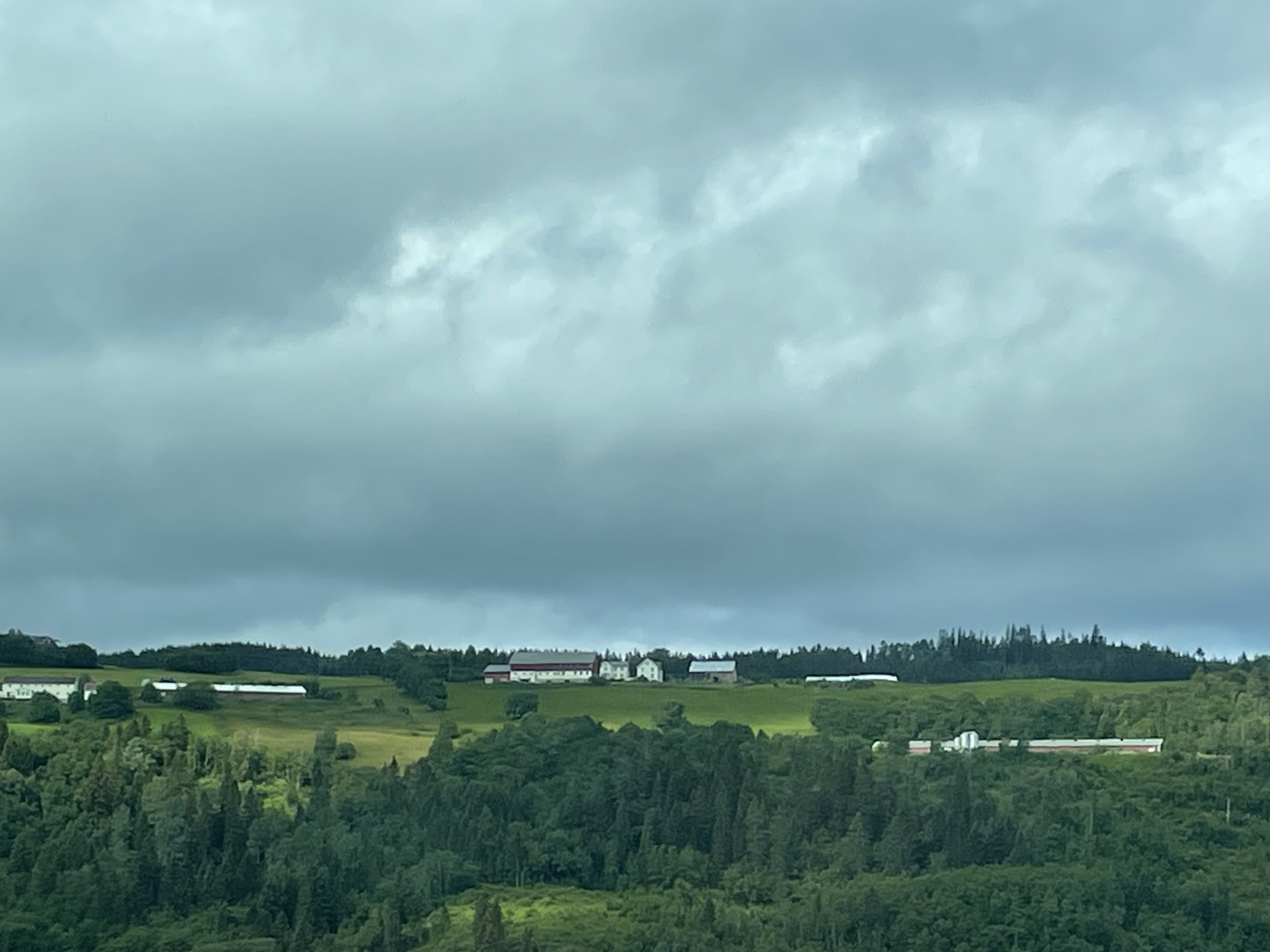
View of the Leinstrand area

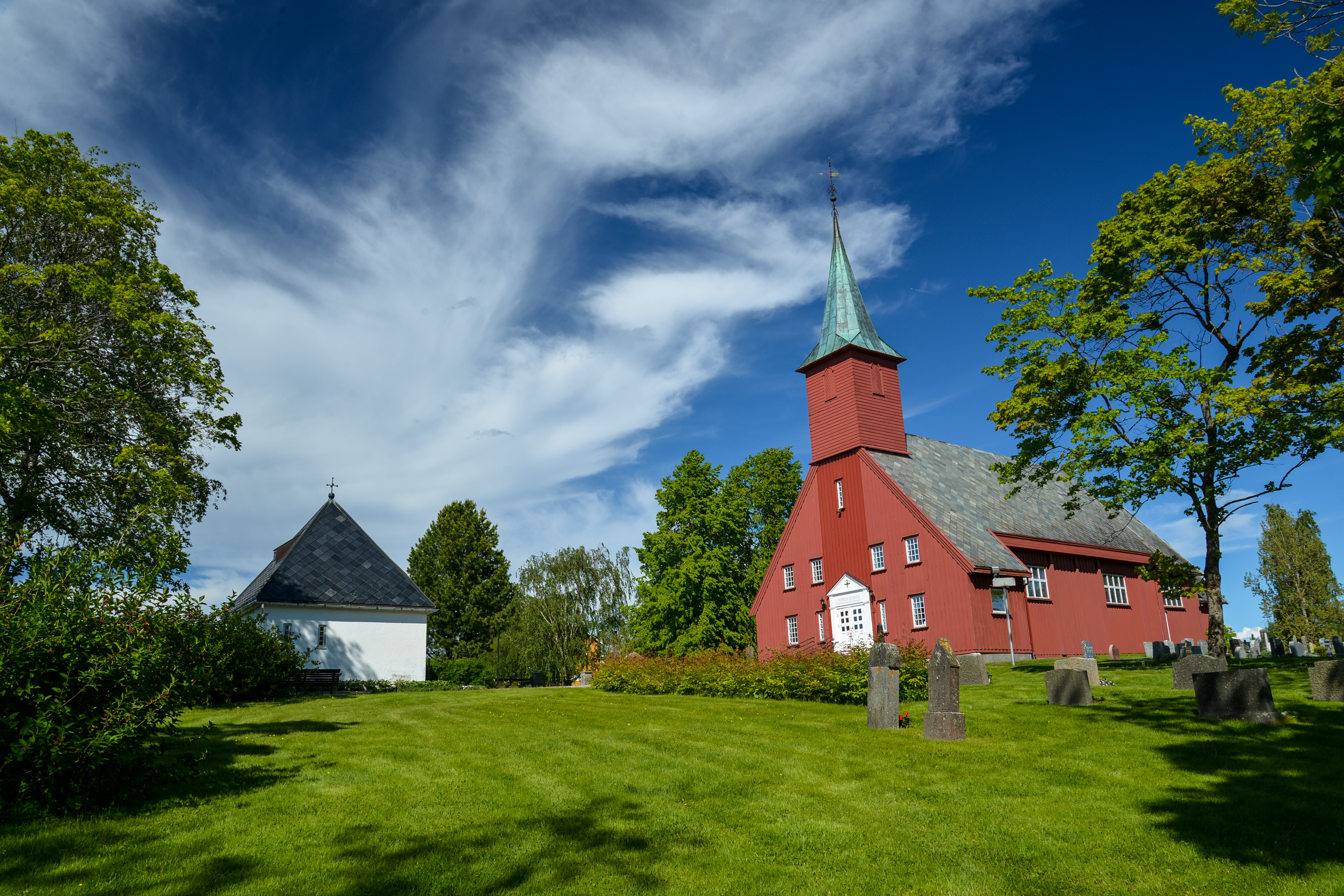
View of the Leinstrand Church

The municipality of Leinstrand was established on 1 January 1838 (see formannskapsdistrikt law). According to the 1835 census, Leinstrand had a population of 1,165.

During the 1960s, there were many municipal mergers across Norway due to the work of the Schei Committee. On 1 January 1964, Byneset Municipality (population: 2,049), Leinstrand Municipality (population: 4,193), Strinda Municipality (population: 44,600), Tiller Municipality (population: 3,595), and the city of Trondheim (population: 56,982) were merged to form the new urban Trondheim Municipality which would have a total population of 111,419.

=== Name ===
The municipality (originally the parish) is named Leinstrand (Old Norse: Leinastrǫnd). The first element comes from the old Leinan farm (Old Norse: Leinar). The name of the farm is the plural form of lein which means "slope". The last element is strǫnd which means "shore". Historically, the name of the municipality was spelled Leinstranden. On 3 November 1917, a royal resolution changed the spelling of the name of the municipality to Leinstrand, removing the definite form ending -en.

=== Churches ===
The Church of Norway had one parish (sokn) within Leinstrand Municipality. At the time of the municipal dissolution, it was part of the Melhus prestegjeld and the Heimdal prosti (deanery) in the Diocese of Nidaros.

Churches in Leinstrand Municipality
Parish (sokn)	Church name	Location of the church	Year built
Leinstrand	Leinstrand Church	Nypan	1673

== Geography ==
The municipality was located at the eastern end of the Gaulosen fjord, just south of the city of Trondheim. It was bordered by Byneset Municipality to the west, Strinda Municipality to the north, Tiller Municipality to the east, and Melhus Municipality to the south. The highest point in the municipality was the 291-metre (955 ft) tall mountain Hesjeberget.

== Government ==
While it existed, Leinstrand Municipality was responsible for primary education (through 10th grade), outpatient health services, senior citizen services, welfare and other social services, zoning, economic development, and municipal roads and utilities. The municipality was governed by a municipal council of directly elected representatives. The mayor was indirectly elected by a vote of the municipal council. The municipality was under the jurisdiction of the Frostating Court of Appeal.

=== Municipal council ===
The municipal council (Herredsstyre) of Leinstrand Municipality was made up of 21 representatives that were elected to four year terms. The tables below show the historical composition of the council by political party.

Leinstrand herredsstyre 1959–1963
Party name (in Norwegian)	Number of representatives
Labour Party (Arbeiderpartiet)	9
Conservative Party (Høyre)	3
Communist Party (Kommunistiske Parti)	1
Christian Democratic Party (Kristelig Folkeparti)	2
Centre Party (Senterpartiet)	4
Liberal Party (Venstre)	2
Total number of members:	21

Leinstrand herredsstyre 1955–1959
Party name (in Norwegian)	Number of representatives
Labour Party (Arbeiderpartiet)	10
Conservative Party (Høyre)	2
Communist Party (Kommunistiske Parti)	1
Christian Democratic Party (Kristelig Folkeparti)	2
Farmers' Party (Bondepartiet)	4
Liberal Party (Venstre)	2
Total number of members:	21

Leinstrand herredsstyre 1951–1955
Party name (in Norwegian)	Number of representatives
Labour Party (Arbeiderpartiet)	9
Conservative Party (Høyre)	2
Communist Party (Kommunistiske Parti)	1
Christian Democratic Party (Kristelig Folkeparti)	2
Farmers' Party (Bondepartiet)	4
Liberal Party (Venstre)	2
Total number of members:	20

Leinstrand herredsstyre 1947–1951
Party name (in Norwegian)	Number of representatives
Labour Party (Arbeiderpartiet)	6
Conservative Party (Høyre)	2
Communist Party (Kommunistiske Parti)	3
Christian Democratic Party (Kristelig Folkeparti)	2
Farmers' Party (Bondepartiet)	4
Liberal Party (Venstre)	3
Total number of members:	20

Leinstrand herredsstyre 1945–1947
Party name (in Norwegian)	Number of representatives
Labour Party (Arbeiderpartiet)	6
Conservative Party (Høyre)	1
Communist Party (Kommunistiske Parti)	3
Christian Democratic Party (Kristelig Folkeparti)	3
Farmers' Party (Bondepartiet)	4
Liberal Party (Venstre)	3
Total number of members:	20

Leinstrand herredsstyre 1937–1941*
Party name (in Norwegian)	Number of representatives
Labour Party (Arbeiderpartiet)	5
Communist Party (Kommunistiske Parti)	1
Farmers' Party (Bondepartiet)	4
Liberal Party (Venstre)	3
Joint list of the Conservative Party (Høyre) and the Free-minded People's Party (Frisinnede Folkeparti)	3
Total number of members:	16
Note: Due to the German occupation of Norway during World War II, no elections were held for new municipal councils until after the war ended in 1945.

=== Mayors ===
The mayor (Norwegian: ordfører) of Leinstrand Municipality was the political leader of the municipality and the chairperson of the municipal council. The following people have held this position:

- 1838–1841: Mons Olsen Ekren
- 1842–1843: John Andersen Busklein
- 1844–1847: Mons Olsen Ekren
- 1848–1849: John Andersen Busklein
- 1850–1853: Andreas Seneppen
- 1854–1855: Anders Liaklev
- 1856–1859: John Andersen Busklein
- 1860–1863: Andreas Seneppen
- 1864–1869: Ole Evensen Stav
- 1870–1871: Ole Johnsen Stav (V)
- 1872–1883: Ole Evensen Stav (MV)
- 1884–1885: Ole Olsen Klæt (H)
- 1886–1891: John Andersen Kvaal
- 1892–1897: Ole Olsen Klæt (H)
- 1898–1901: Ole J. Ekren (V)
- 1902–1922: Simon Leinum (V)
- 1923–1925: Sigmund Berg (Bp)
- 1926–1928: Simon Leinum (V)
- 1929–1931: Peder Konrad Hustad (Bp)
- 1932–1934: Ivar Hegstad (Bp)
- 1935–1945: Ivar Skjetlein (Bp/NS)
- 1945–1945: Leiv Qvenild (NS)
- 1945–1955: Ole Andersen Klæt (Bp)
- 1956–1959: Alf Alfnes (Ap)
- 1960–1963: Ivar Sakshaug (Bp)

== See also ==
- List of former municipalities of Norway
