= City Syd =

Shopping centre in Norway

Coordinates: 63°21′42″N 10°22′38″E

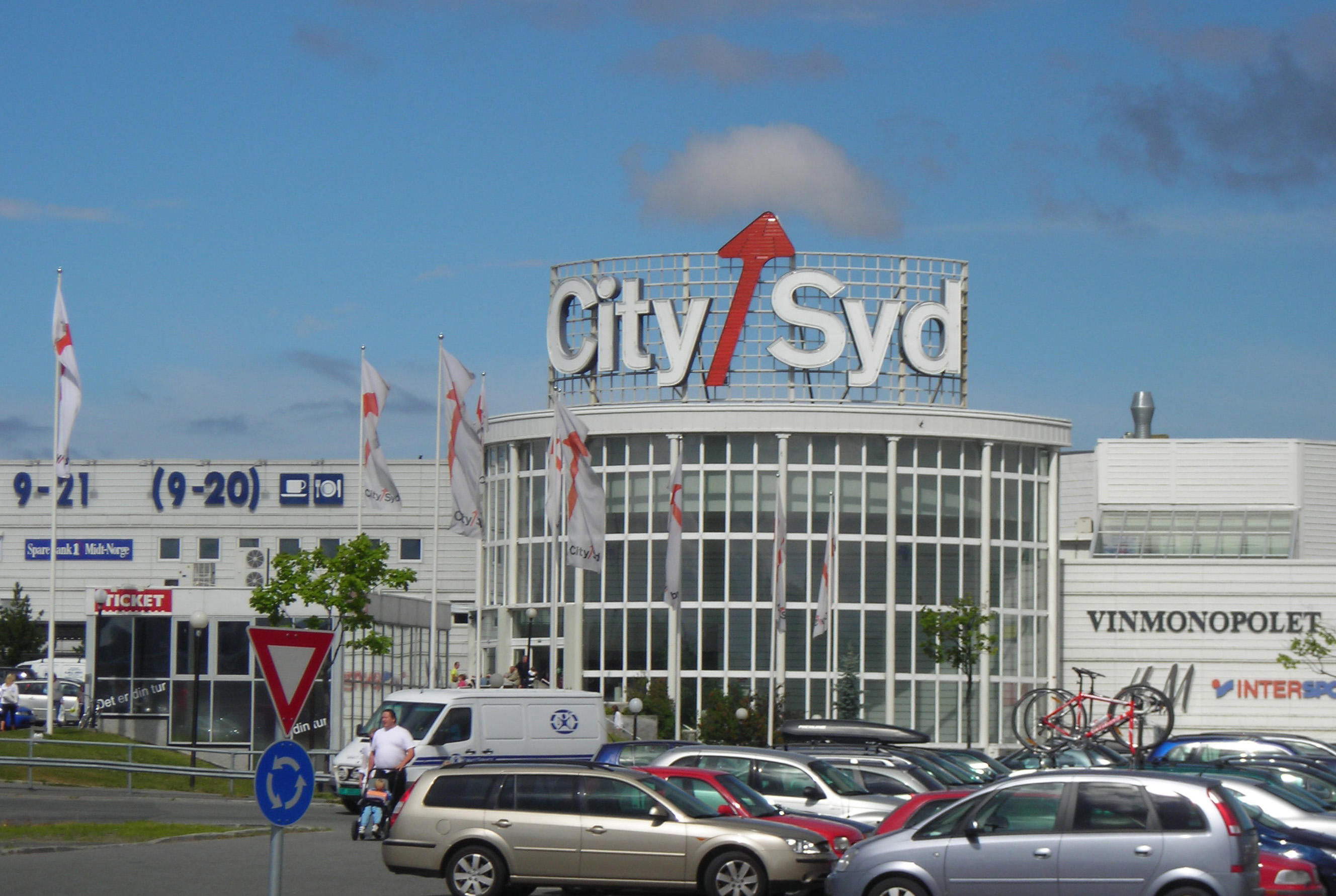
City Syd.

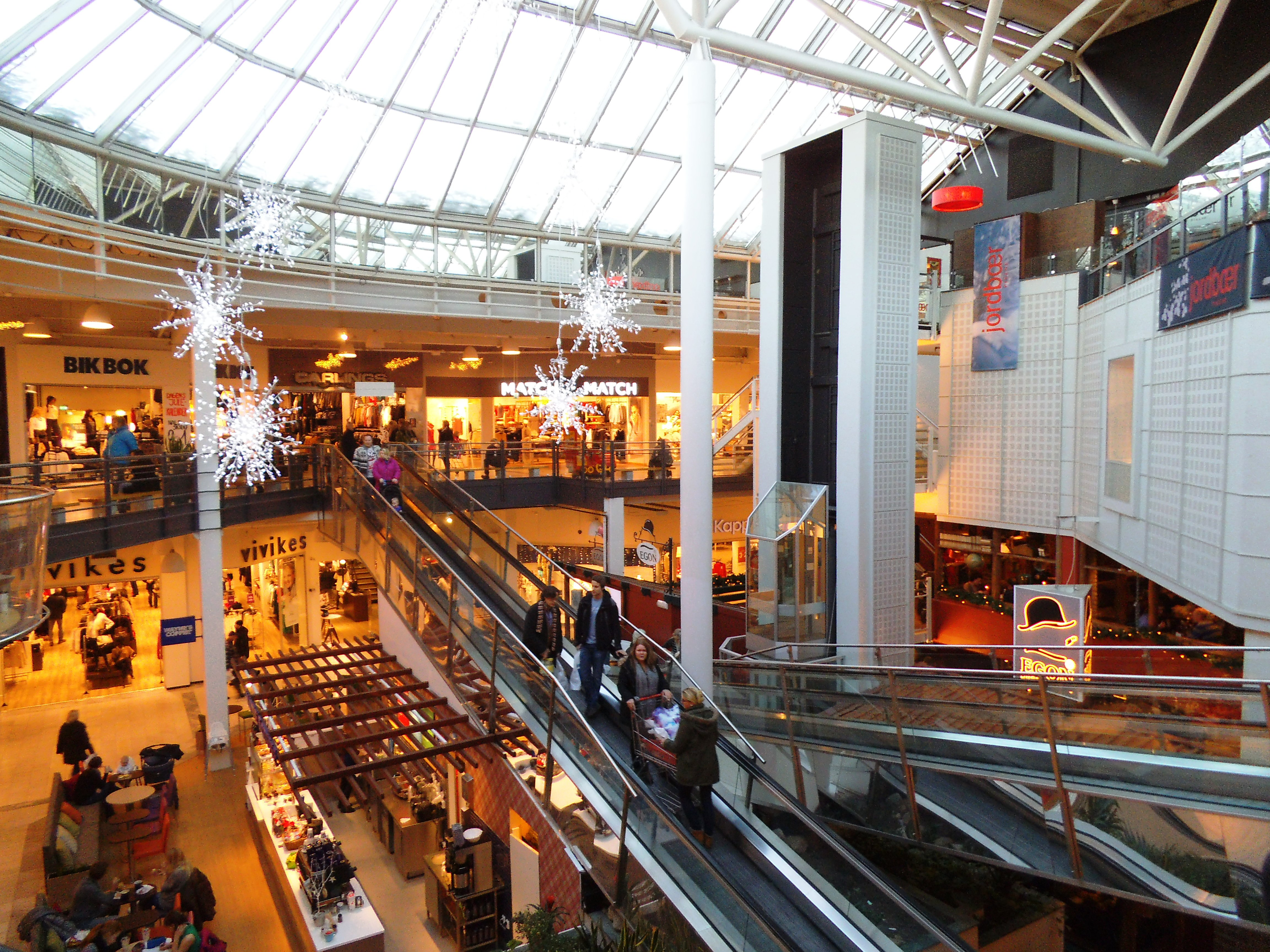
Interiors in City Syd

City Syd is the largest shopping centres in Norway, and the largest in Midt-Norge, with a turnover of NOK 1.7 billion in 2004. It is located in Tiller, in the Heimdal area of Trondheim. City Syd opened in 1987 and was remodeled and expanded in 2000. It is now 25,193 m^{2} and has 70 stores on three floors. It is owned by the Trondheim Cooperative, Trondos and Storebrand.

== 2020 ==
In September 2020, real estate and hotel business the Thon Group took over management of six Norwegian shopping centres owned by and subsequently taking on operations at City Syd.
