= Heimdal Church =

Church in Trøndelag, Norway

- Heimdal kirke
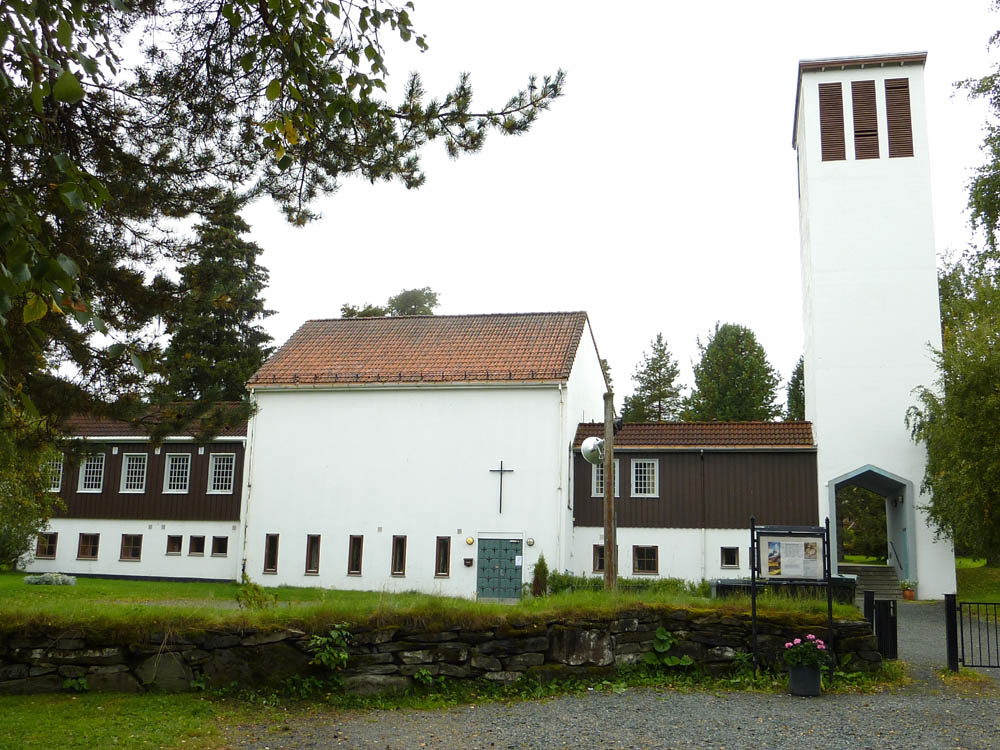
- View of the church
- Heimdal Church
- 63.3503°N 10.3516°E
- Location: Trondheim Municipality, Trøndelag
- Country: Norway
- Denomination: Church of Norway
- Churchmanship: Evangelical Lutheran

History
- Status: Parish church
- Founded: 1960
- Consecrated: 6 Nov 1960

Architecture
- Functional status: Active
- Architect: Herman Semmelmann
- Architectural type: Rectangular
- Completed: 1960 (66 years ago)

Specifications
- Capacity: 180
- Materials: Concrete

Administration
- Diocese: Nidaros bispedømme
- Deanery: Heimdal og Byåsen prosti
- Parish: Heimdal
- Norwegian Cultural Heritage Site
- Type: Church
- Status: Not protected
- ID: 84526

Heimdal Church (Norwegian: Heimdal kirke) is a parish church of the Church of Norway in Trondheim Municipality in Trøndelag county, Norway. It is located in the village of Heimdal, about 1.5 kilometres (0.93 mi) south of Kolstad Church. It is the church for the Heimdal parish which is part of the Heimdal og Byåsen prosti (deanery) in the Diocese of Nidaros. The modern, white, concrete church was built in a rectangular design in 1960 using plans drawn up by the architect Herman Semmelmann. The church seats about 180 people.

== History ==
In 1932, the Heimdal area parishioners formed the Heimdal Chapel Association which had a goal of some day building a chapel in Heimdal. In 1960, their dream was realized when a new chapel was constructed in Heimdal. The building was consecrated on 6 November 1960 by Bishop Arne Fjellbu. In 1971, the chapel was upgraded to be a full parish church.

== See also ==
- List of churches in Nidaros
