= Tamir Tuller =

Israeli researcher

- תמיר טולר
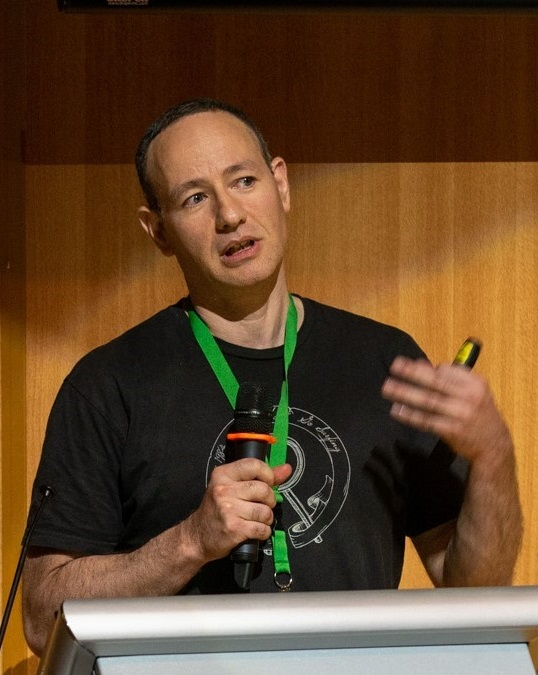
- Tuller in 2021
- Known for: Computational Synthetic Biology
- Awards: Juludan Research Prize (2016)
- Scientific career
- Fields: Systems Biology, Synthetic Biology, Computer Science
- Institutions: Tel Aviv University

Tamir Tuller (Hebrew: תמיר טולר) is an Israeli engineer, a computer scientist, and a systems and synthetic biologist. He is a professor, incumbent of the Chair in Computational Synthetic Biology, and the director of Tel Aviv University's Laboratory of Computational Systems and Synthetic Biology. As of February 2022, Tuller has authored over 150 peer-reviewed scientific journal articles and hundreds of additional types of publications and patents. In addition, he is the founder and primary instructor of the International Genetically Engineered Machine program at Tel Aviv University and an entrepreneur.

== Research and career ==
Tuller is presently a Full Professor at the Tel-Aviv University in the Department of Biomedical Engineering and Edmond J. Safra centre for Bioinformatics. Prior to obtaining his current position, he also was an engineer at DSP group in VLSI chip design. He served as the co-founder and chief scientific officer of Synvaccine Ltd, and Imagindairy Ltd and as a consultant to various additional biotech companies.

== Awards and honors ==
Tuller received the Juludan Research Prize from the Technion, Israel Institute of Technology in 2016.

== Publications ==
As of February 2022, Tuller has authored over 150 peer-reviewed scientific journal articles and hundreds of additional types of publications and patents.

- Accelerating Whole-Cell Simulations of mRNA Translation Using a Dedicated Hardware.
- Estimating the predictive power of silent mutations on cancer classification and prognosis.
- Algorithms for ribosome traffic engineering and their potential in improving host cells' titer and growth rate.
- High-resolution modeling of the selection on local mRNA folding strength in coding sequences across the Tree of Life.
- Solving the riddle of the evolution of Shine-Dalgarno based translation in chloroplasts.
- Novel Insights into Gene Expression Regulation during Meiosis Revealed by Translation Elongation Dynamics.
- ChimeraUGEM: unsupervised gene expression modeling in any given organism.
