= Grunge, Norway =

Village in Vinje Municipality, Norway

Grunge
- Village
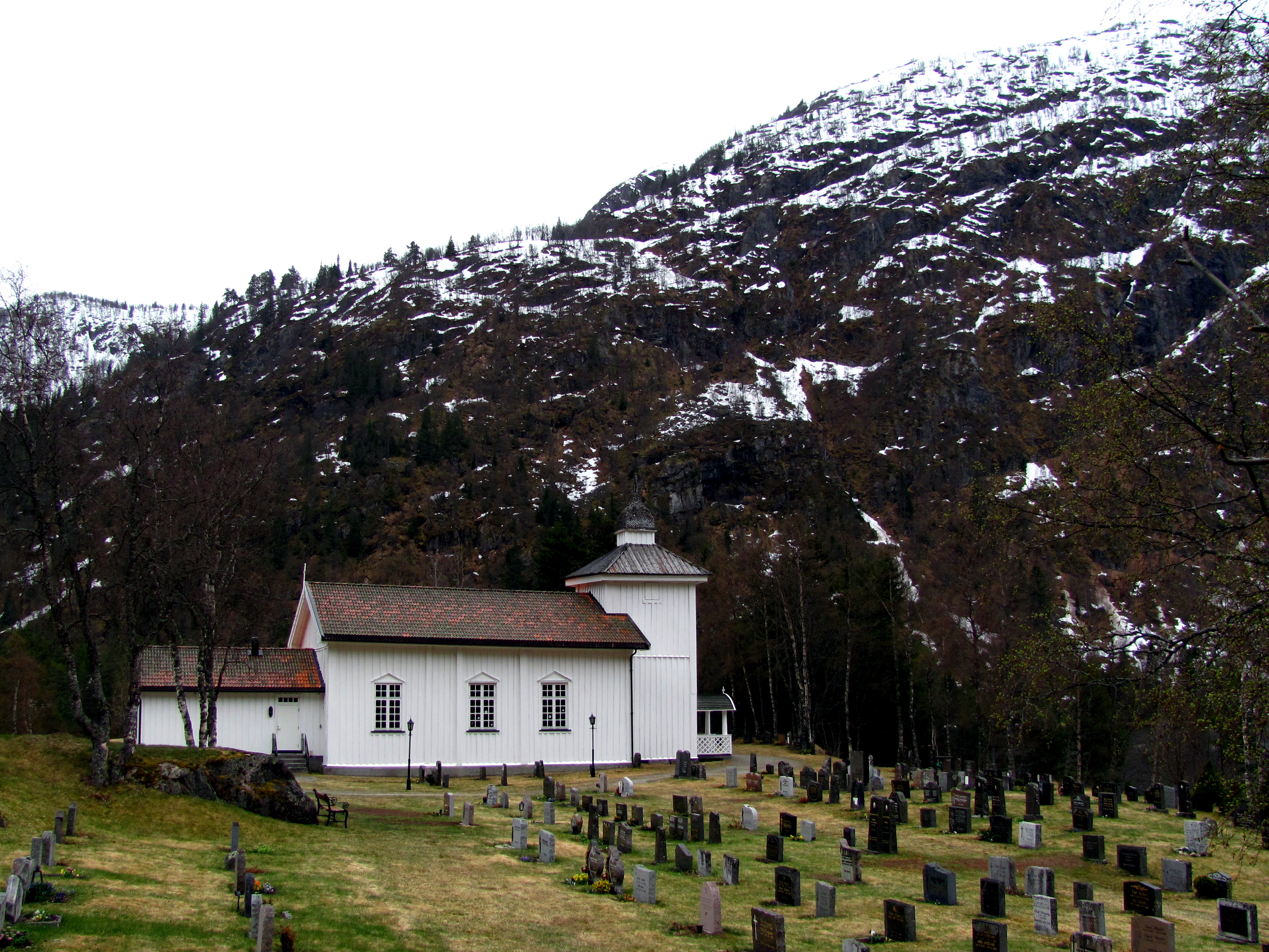
- View of the village church
- Interactive map of Grunge
- Coordinates: 59.71398°N 7.76017°E
- Country: Norway
- Region: Eastern Norway
- County: Telemark
- District: Vest-Telemark
- Municipality: Vinje Municipality
- Elevation: 583 m (1,913 ft)
- Time zone: UTC+01:00 (CET)
  - Summer (DST): UTC+02:00 (CEST)
- Post Code: 3895 Edland

Grunge is a village in Vinje Municipality in Telemark county, Norway. The village is located on the north shore of the lake Tveitevatnet, about 12 kilometres (7.5 mi) to the east of the villages of Haukeli and Edland. The European route E134 highway runs through the village. Grunge Church is located a short distance west of the village.
