= Byneset =

Headland in Trondheim, Norway

- Peninsula
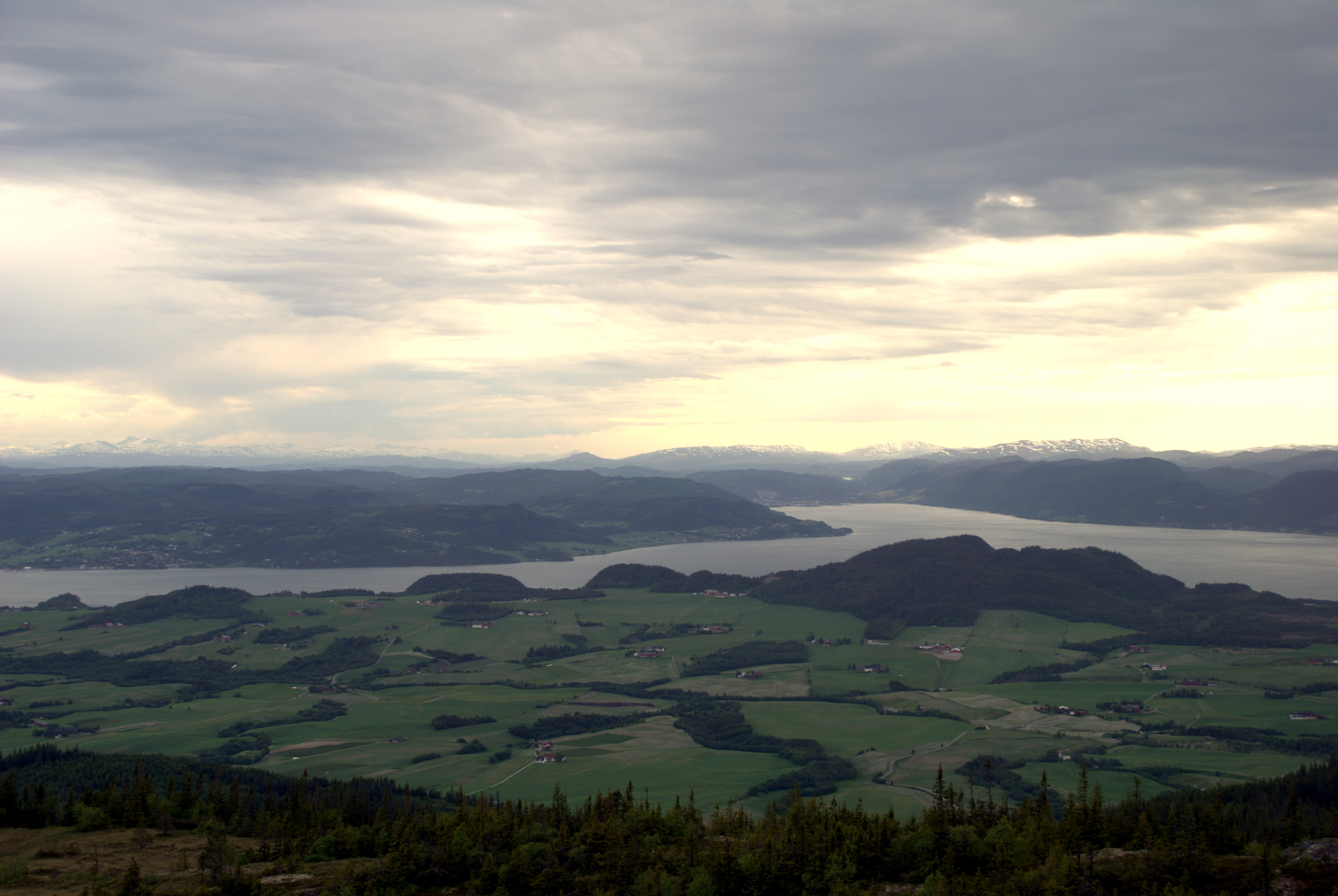
- View of Byneset, looking to the southwest
- Interactive map of the peninsula
- Coordinates: 63.37632°N 10.13629°E
- Location: Trøndelag, Norway
- Offshore water bodies: Trondheimsfjorden, Orkdalsfjorden, Gaulosen

Area
  - Total: 78.5 square kilometres (30.3 sq mi)

Byneset is a headland located in Trondheim Municipality in Trøndelag county, Norway. The area is located just west of the city of Trondheim. The Trondheimsfjorden lies to the north, Orkdalsfjorden lies to the west, and the Gaulosen bay lies to the south. The villages of Spongdal and Langørjan are both located on the headland.

In 1999, the 18-hole golf course, Byneset Golfsenter, was built. Anne B. Ragde's novel trilogy Berlinerpoplene – Eremittkrepsene – Ligge i grønne enger (2004–2007) is set in Byneset.

== Geography ==
Byneset is separated from the city of Trondheim by the Bymarka area which is a mountainous, forested area, while Byneset is generally more flat, agricultural land. Agriculture and forestry are the main industries in the area, and there is significant grain and milk production. The landscape in the west is relatively flat, with well-cultivated fields and some marshland (Høstadmyra), while in the east it is heavily hilly with forests and mountains. The highest peak is Storheia at 566 metres (1,857 ft) above sea level.

== History ==
Byneset was populated very early and is rich in archaeological finds from the Stone Age, Bronze Age, and Iron Age. The Byneset Church is a stone church from the 1170s with an altarpiece and pulpit from the 17th century. The church is still in use and it is located on county road 831, about 2.5 kilometres (1.6 mi) west of the village of Spongdal.

The Byneset area was historically part of Byneset Municipality which existed from 1838 until 1964.

In May 2025, a 135 metres (443 ft) long container ship ran aground off the Northeastern coast of Byneset. The Cypriot-flagged ship, NCL Salten narrowly missed hitting a house. A quick clay landslide slowly started developing and is about to undermine a house near the coast, likely as a result of the ship wreck.

=== Name ===
The area has been named Bynes or Byneset since the mid-1400s. The first element is the name of the old By farm (Old Norse: býr) which means "farm". The last element is the old name (1400s and earlier) for the medieval parish for this area, Nes, which is the word for "headland".
