= Heimdal =

Bydel Heimdal
- Borough
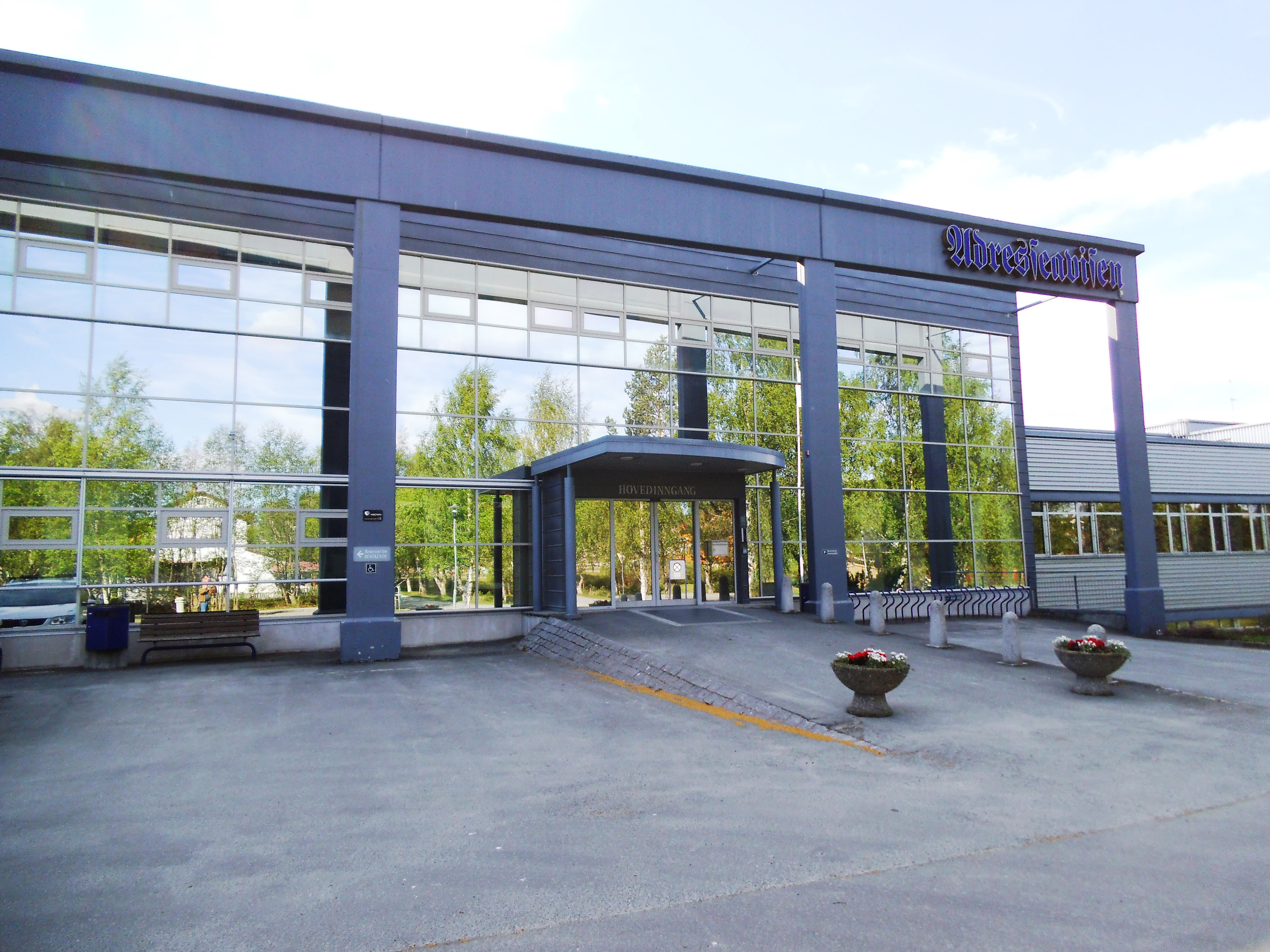
- Office of Adresseavisen in Heimdal

- Coat of arms
- Interactive map of Bydel Heimdal
- Coordinates: 63.3513°N 10.3565°E
- Country: Norway
- Region: Central Norway
- County: Trøndelag
- Municipality: Trondheim Municipality
- City: Trondheim
- Elevation: 143 m (469 ft)
- Time zone: UTC+01:00 (CET)
  - Summer (DST): UTC+02:00 (CEST)
- Post Code: 7080 Heimdal

Heimdal is a borough in Trondheim Municipality in Trøndelag county, Norway. It covers the western and southwestern parts of the municipality. The main centre of the borough is also known as Heimdal and it is located in the central part of the borough, near Heimdal Church and the Tillerbyen neighborhood.

This area around the Heimdal Rail Station was until 1964 the center of two separate local municipalities: Tiller Municipality and Leinstrand Municipality. The western part of Heimdal borough consists of the rural areas of Byneset (which was the separate Byneset Municipality prior to 1964). Tillerbyen, the eastern part of the village of Heimdal, is a recent development, planned to ease the pressure on central Trondheim from the commercial boom in the inner city.

== History ==
This area south of Trondheim was named after the Old Norse god Heimdall from Norse mythology. The area has been continuously inhabited since at least the Iron Age, and is rich in archaeological sites. The area where Tillerbyen has been built was initially swamp, but it was drained in the 1930s as an airport was planned here. Nazi invaders of 1940 halted these plans, as they rather wanted an airport at Lade.

The sports club Heimdal IF was founded in 1929.

In 1963, Trondheim Municipality bought the areas, and in 1966 they verified a development plan for a new tertiary and commercial hub that could lighten the development pressure on the crowded downtown areas. These plans met much resistance; many politicians thought the development would be too hard to complete, as the soil was too wet and unstable to support large-scale development. Ever since the first developments, the areas of Tillerbyen and Sjetnemarka have been one of the most booming parts of the city and still, large development projects are launched to meet the growing population pressure.

== Today ==
Heimdal proper is a traditional commercial and transportation center; the railway has connections to Sweden (Nabotåget, literally meaning the neighbour train), to Oslo and the south of Norway via the Dovre Line as well as to the north. Many bus lines also connect here.

In addition to the large residential areas, Heimdal houses many of the city's leading enterprises and services. City Syd was at the time of its construction the largest shopping mall in the country and is still one of the most profitable shopping malls in Northern Europe, as it receives customers not only from the city, but from the surrounding countryside and neighbouring counties as well. Heimdal Stadion is a large sports complex with soccer and handball fields adjacent to the Breidablikk School.

Heimdal is today a city within a city. The central areas of Tillerbyen resemble a typical western downtown area with high commercial structures, as opposed to the traditional downtown areas of Trondheim, which are dominated by old, two-storey buildings.

== See also ==
- List of boroughs in Trondheim prior to 2005
