= Grunge Church =

Church in Telemark, Norway

- Grunge kyrkje
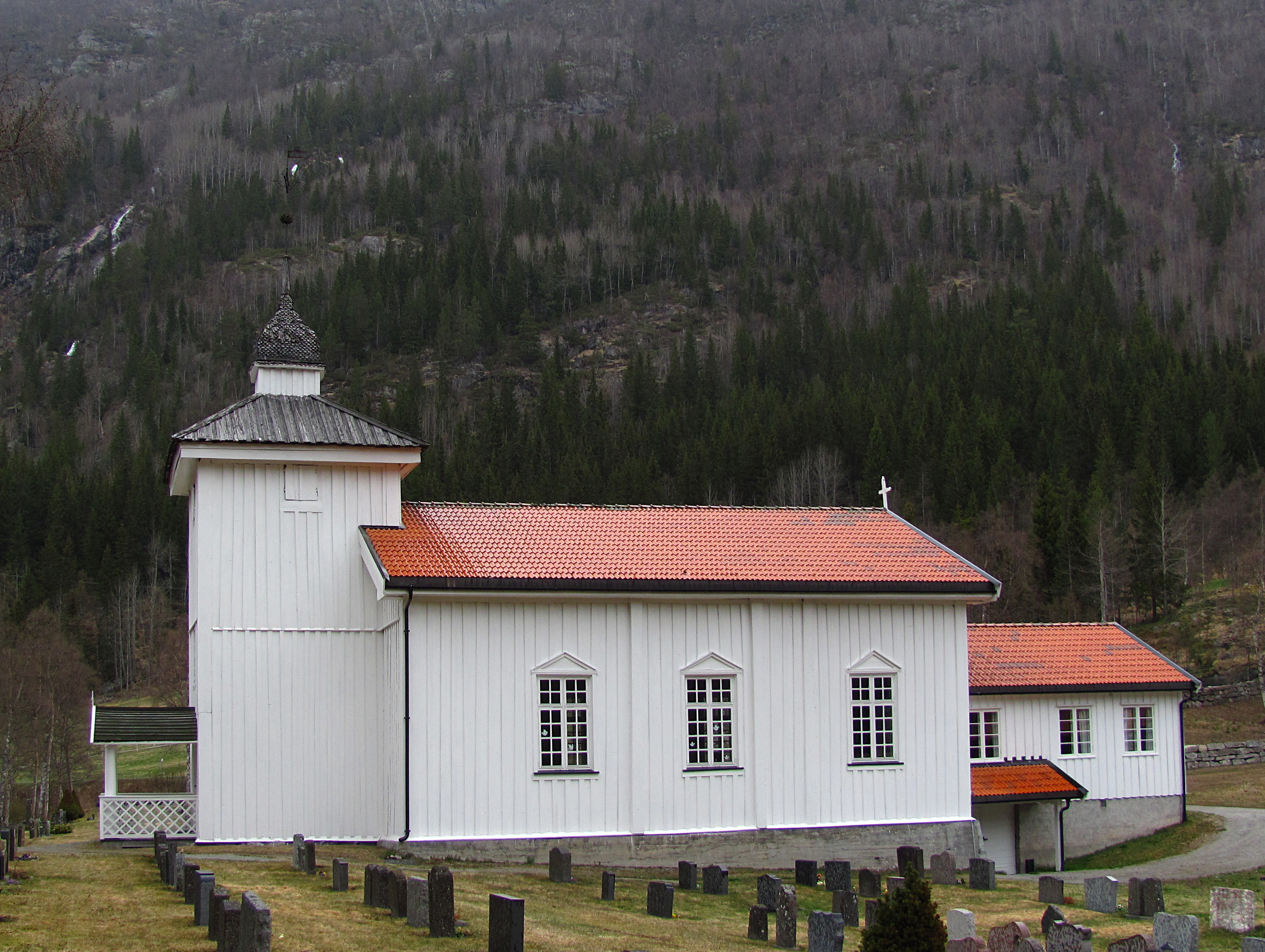
- View of the church
- Grunge Church
- 59°43′23″N 7°41′49″E
- Location: Vinje Municipality, Telemark
- Country: Norway
- Denomination: Church of Norway
- Churchmanship: Evangelical Lutheran

History
- Status: Parish church
- Founded: 1850
- Consecrated: 1850

Architecture
- Functional status: Active
- Architect: Hans Linstow
- Architectural type: Long church
- Completed: 1850 (176 years ago)

Specifications
- Capacity: 132
- Materials: Wood

Administration
- Diocese: Agder og Telemark
- Deanery: Øvre Telemark prosti
- Parish: Grungedal
- Norwegian Cultural Heritage Site
- Type: Church
- Status: Automatically protected
- ID: 84436

Grunge Church (Norwegian: Grunge kyrkje) is a parish church of the Church of Norway in Vinje Municipality in Telemark county, Norway. It is located just outside the village of Grunge along the lake Tveitevatnet. It is the church for the Grungedal parish which is part of the Øvre Telemark prosti (deanery) in the Diocese of Agder og Telemark. The white, wooden church was built in a long church design in 1850 using plans drawn up by the architect Hans Linstow. The church seats about 132 people.

== History ==
Records from 1567 show that there was an old church just southeast of the village of Edland. The church fell into disrepair and eventually was closed and torn down because the parish couldn't afford to pay for a new church. The parish of Grungedal was then merged (back) into the main Vinje Church parish. In the 1840s, there became a need for a church in the western part of Vinje, so the old Grungedal parish was re-established. A site along the lake Tveitevatnet at Straumstøyl was chosen (a little further to the southeast of the medieval church site). Initially, the church was also known as Straumstøyl Church. Records show that the parish priest Anton Elias Smitt adapted Hans Linstow's architectural drawing a little from the original. The church was built by Saave Brufloti from Mo and was completed in the autumn of 1850. The church has a west tower with a church porch at the foot of the tower. It had no sacristy to begin with, but in 1958, an addition on the east side of the building was completed. This new wing included a sacristy and a church hall.

== Media gallery ==
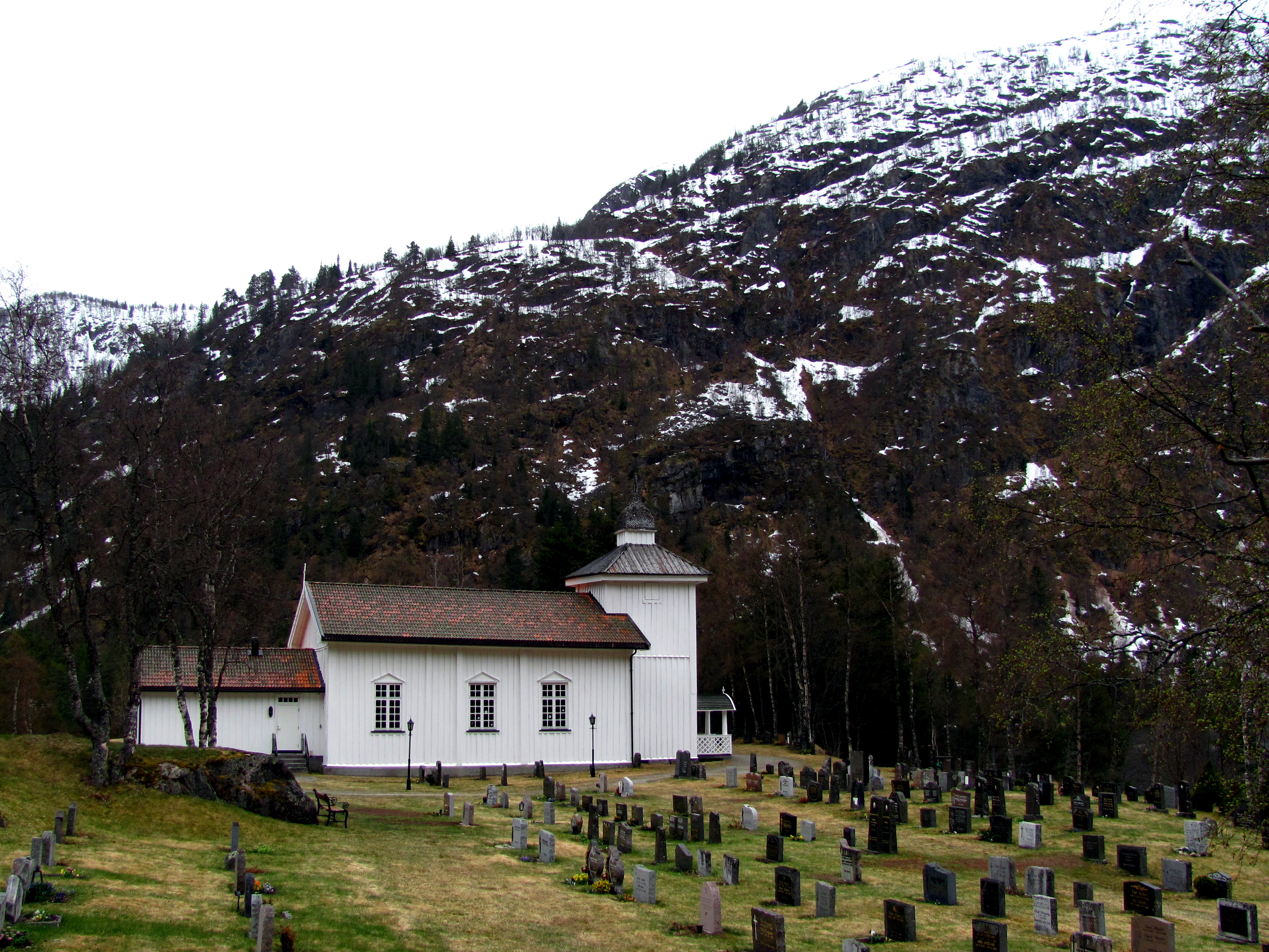

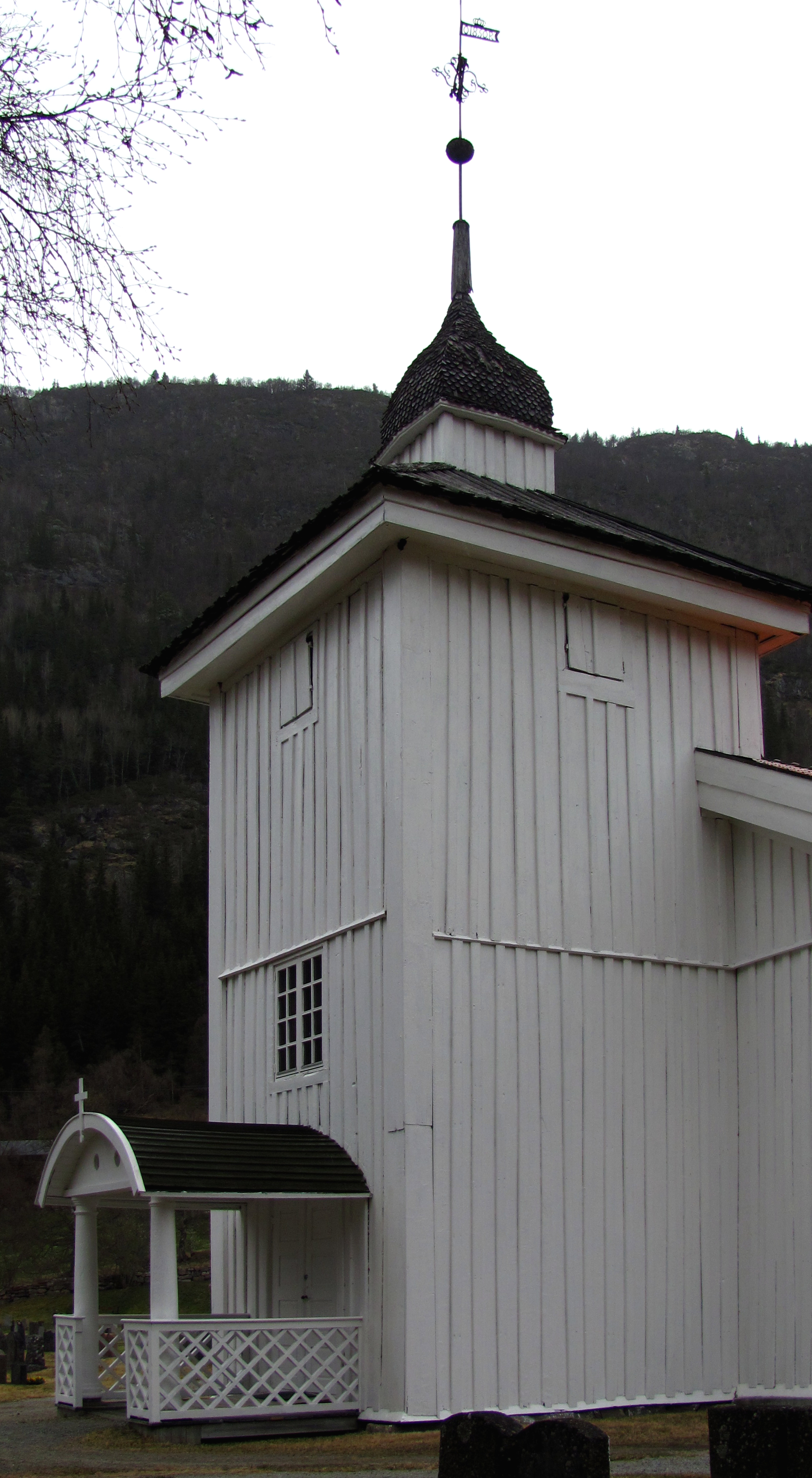

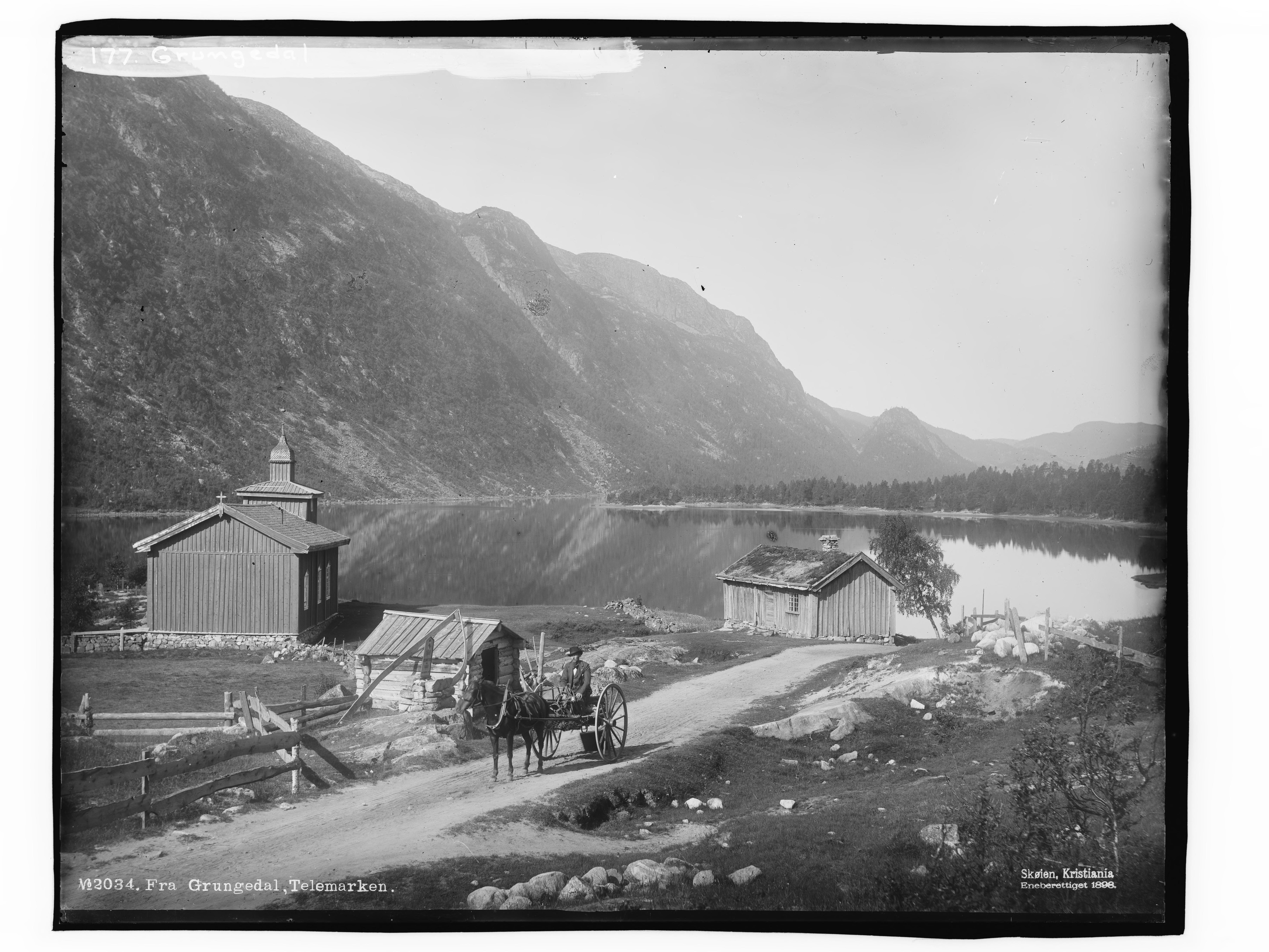

== See also ==
- List of churches in Agder og Telemark
