= Tiller, Norway =

Neighborhood within Trondheim, Norway

Tiller Tillerbyen
- Neighborhood in Trondheim
- Interactive map of Tiller
- Coordinates: 63.36425°N 10.39019°E
- Country: Norway
- Region: Central Norway
- County: Trøndelag
- Municipality: Trondheim Municipality
- Borough: Heimdal
- Elevation: 10 m (33 ft)
- Time zone: UTC+01:00 (CET)
  - Summer (DST): UTC+02:00 (CEST)

Tiller or Tillerbyen is a neighborhood in the borough of Heimdal in the city of Trondheim, Norway. It is located in the southwestern part of Trondheim Municipality in Trøndelag county.

Tiller Church is located in the neighborhood. The European route E6 highway passes through Tiller from north to south, connecting Trondheim with Melhus. The highway was rebuilt as a four-lane motorway from 2011-2019. Tiller has large commercial areas including shopping centers and around 300 businesses, especially in Tillerbyen. Among the shopping centers in this area, City Syd is the best known. Tiller IL is the sports club based in Tiller.
