= Tiller Church =

Church in Trøndelag, Norway

- Tiller kirke
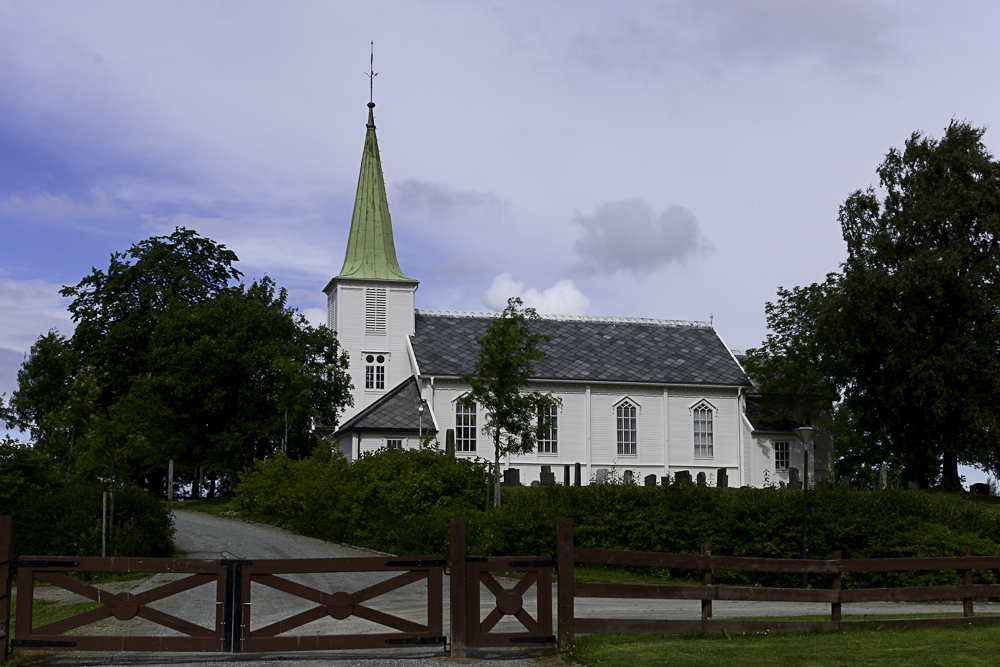
- View of the church
- Tiller Church
- 63.3614413007°N 10.405407249°E
- Location: Trondheim Municipality, Trøndelag
- Country: Norway
- Denomination: Church of Norway
- Churchmanship: Evangelical Lutheran

History
- Status: Parish church
- Founded: 14th century
- Consecrated: 4 Jan 1901
- Events: 9 Sept 2001: Fire

Architecture
- Functional status: Active
- Architect: Johan Kunig
- Architectural type: Long church
- Completed: 1901 (125 years ago)

Specifications
- Capacity: 200
- Materials: Wood

Administration
- Diocese: Nidaros bispedømme
- Deanery: Heimdal og Byåsen prosti
- Parish: Tiller
- Norwegian Cultural Heritage Site
- Type: Church
- Status: Listed
- ID: 85620

Tiller Church (Norwegian: Tiller kirke) is a parish church of the Church of Norway in Trondheim Municipality in Trøndelag county, Norway. It is located in the Tiller area in the city of Trondheim. It is the church for the Tiller parish which is part of the Heimdal og Byåsen prosti (deanery) in the Diocese of Nidaros. The white, wooden church was built in a long church style in 1901 by the architect Johan Kunig. The church seats about 200 people.

== History ==
The earliest existing historical records of the church date back to the year 1533, but the church was not new that year. The first church in Tiller was likely a stave church that may have been built during the 14th century. The first church was located about 2.2 kilometres (1.4 mi) southeast of the present church site. In 1665, the old medieval church was torn down and replaced with a new building on the same site. The new timber-framed long church had a rectangular nave and narrower, rectangular choir, a tower on the roof over the middle of the nave. In 1688, a new porch outside the west entrance was added.

In 1801, the old church was torn down and a new church was built about 100 metres (330 ft) north of the old church site. It was consecrated in 1801 by the Bishop Johan Christian Schønheyder, although some of the finish work and painting was completed until 1803. This new church was quite similar to the nearby Klæbu Church. It had an octagonal floor plan and a slate roof. This church was destroyed by a violent landslide on the evening of 7 March 1816. The landslide caused damage and death to people and animals in the area.

Soon after, planning for a new church began, but a new, safer site was to be chosen. A new church at Tiller was consecrated in 1820 on a small plateau about 200 metres (660 ft) west of the medieval church site. The new building was consecrated on 29 September 1820. It was not completely finished by the day of its consecration. It was painted on the outside in 1825, and the altarpiece, carved by Halvor Søbstad, was painted in 1831. This was also an octagonal timber church.

In 1894 it was decided to move the church site to Sjetne, about 2.3 kilometres (1.4 mi) northwest of the old church site. Controversy arose over this decision, but the relatively new church was sold for demolition anyway. The new church was constructed in 1900-1901 and the old church was sold and taken down around the same time. The new church was designed by Johan Kunig. It was consecrated on 4 January 1901. The new long church had room for about 200 people and a tower on the west end. The church was renovated in 1946–1947.

On 9 September 2001, the church was very heavily damaged in a fire that was likely arson. Initially, there were concerns that the building could not be repaired, but in the end, the church was able to be repaired. The church was back in use in 2002 after a year of repairs.

== Media gallery ==
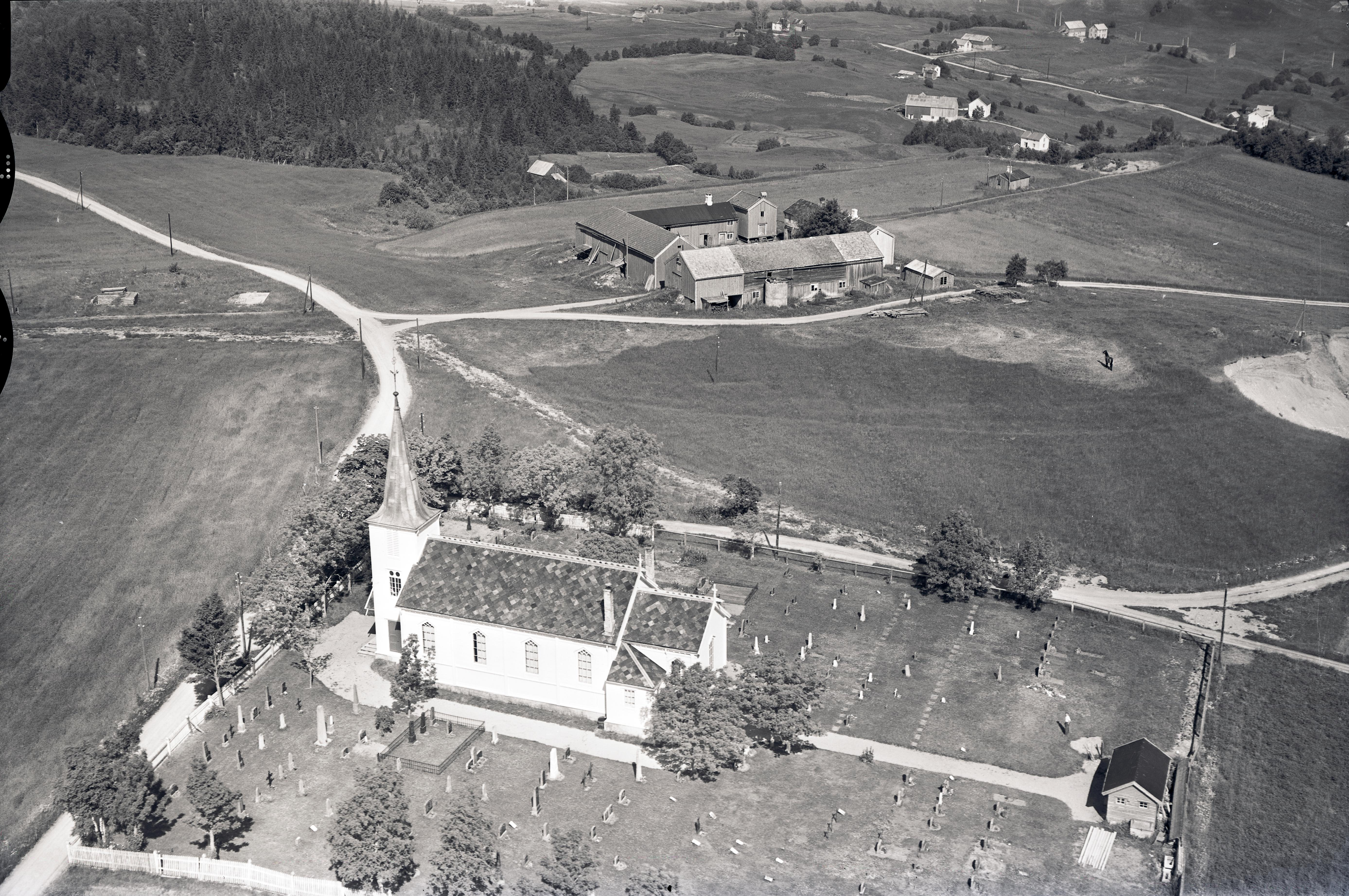
Aerial view of the church (in 1952)

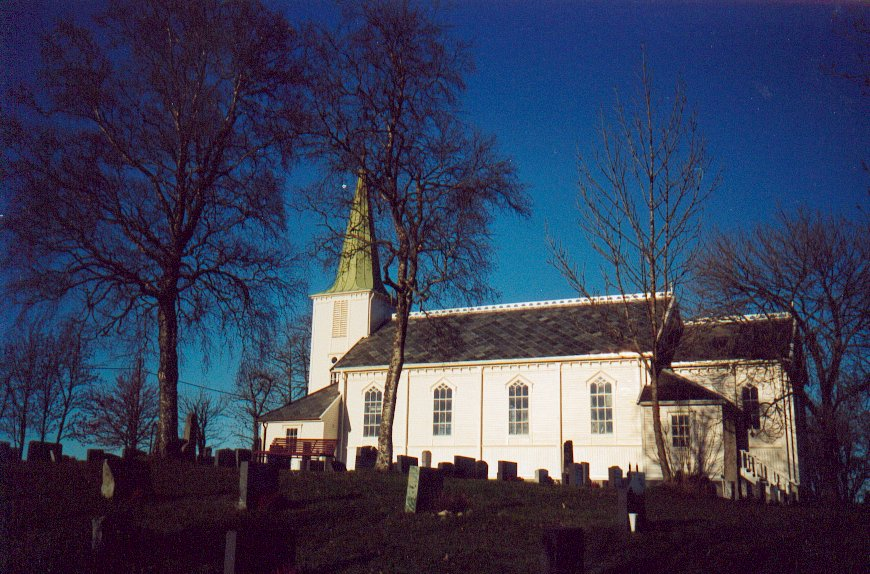
Exterior view of the church (in 2009)

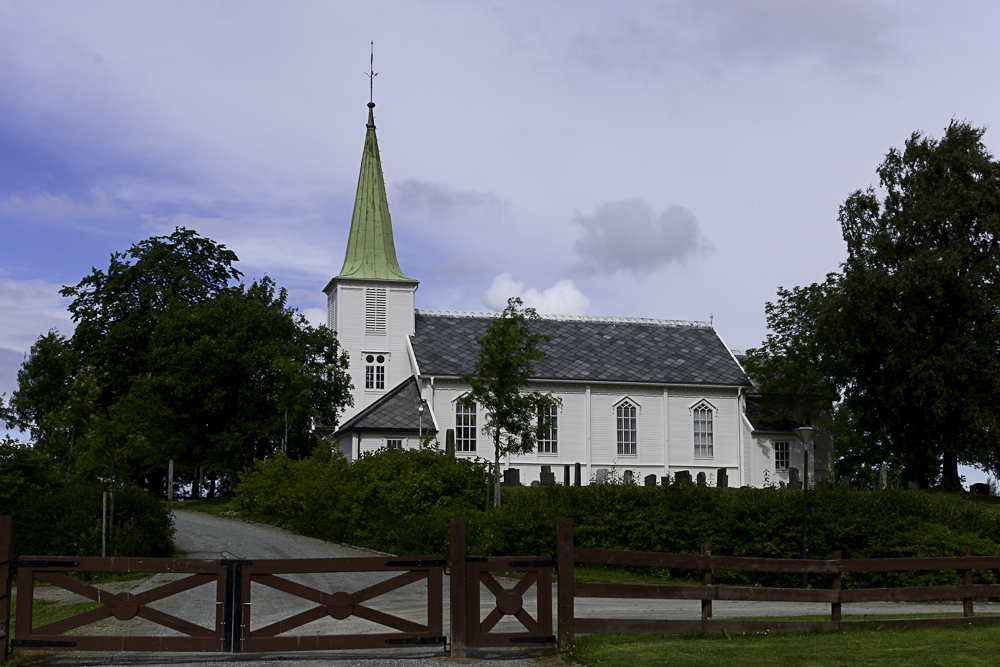
Exterior view of the church (in 2013)

== See also ==
- List of churches in Nidaros
