= Byneset Church =

Church in Trøndelag, Norway

- Byneset kirke
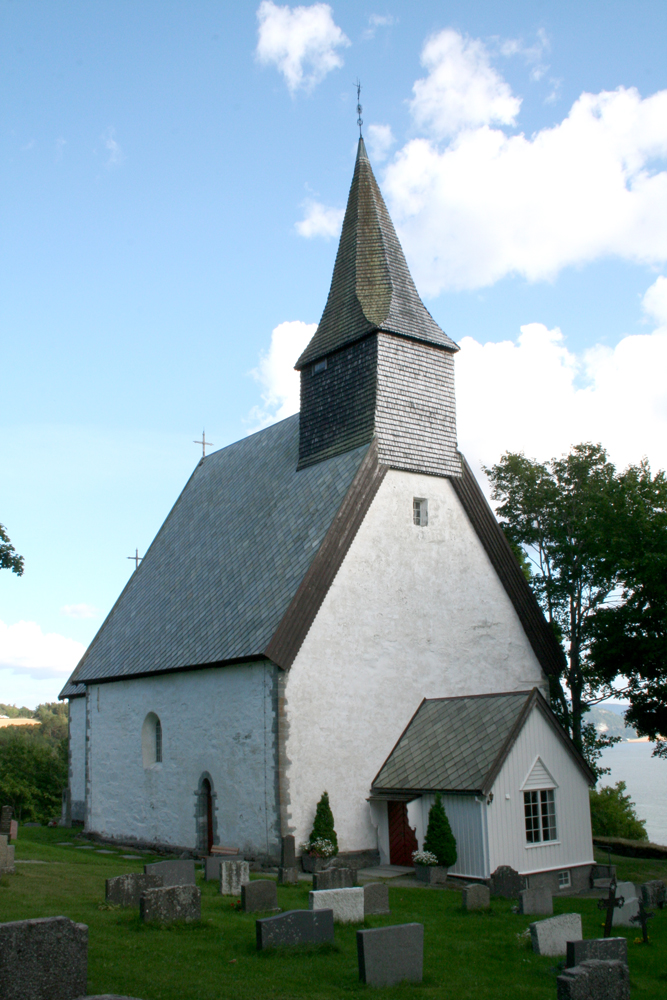
- View of the church
- Byneset Church
- 63.3558414627°N 10.11579975485°E
- Location: Trondheim Municipality, Trøndelag
- Country: Norway
- Denomination: Church of Norway
- Previous denomination: Catholic Church
- Churchmanship: Evangelical Lutheran

History
- Former name(s): St. Michael's Church (Sankt Michaelskirken)
- Status: Parish church
- Founded: c. 1140
- Dedication: St. Michael
- Consecrated: c. 1180

Architecture
- Functional status: Active
- Architectural type: Long church
- Style: Romanesque
- Groundbreaking: c. 1140
- Completed: c. 1180 (846 years ago)

Specifications
- Capacity: 230
- Materials: Stone

Administration
- Diocese: Nidaros bispedømme
- Deanery: Heimdal og Byåsen prosti
- Parish: Byneset og Leinstrand
- Norwegian Cultural Heritage Site
- Type: Church
- Status: Automatically protected
- ID: 83980

Byneset Church (Norwegian: Byneset kirke) is a medieval parish church of the Church of Norway in Trondheim Municipality in Trøndelag county, Norway. It is located in the Byneset area of the city of Trondheim. It is one of the churches for the Byneset og Leinstrand parish which is part of the Heimdal og Byåsen prosti (deanery) in the Diocese of Nidaros. The white, plastered stone church was built in a long church design during the 12th century using plans drawn up by an unknown architect. The church seats about 230 people.

== History ==
The white, stone church was consecrated as St. Michaelskirken and dedicated to the Archangel Michael. The year of consecration is not exactly known, but it is assumed that it was about 1180 during the time of Eysteinn Erlendsson (Øystein Erlendsson), the Archbishop of the Archdiocese of Nidaros. The same mason signatures on this building are also found at the Nidaros Cathedral, indicating that the same masons were used in the construction of both churches. The church is built of stone in a Romanesque style and is a long church design. The construction likely began around the year 1140 and lasted about 40 years, with its completion around 1180. The tower was built around the year 1650. In 1656, a church porch was constructed in front of the west gate. The church was renovated in 1811.

In 1814, this church served as an election church (Norwegian: valgkirke). Together with more than 300 other parish churches across Norway, it was a polling station for elections to the 1814 Norwegian Constituent Assembly which wrote the Constitution of Norway. This was Norway's first national elections. Each church parish was a constituency that elected people called "electors" who later met together in each county to elect the representatives for the assembly that was to meet at Eidsvoll Manor later that year.

The baroque altarpiece dates from 1695 and is richly decorated depicting the Crucifixion of Jesus. When the church was restored in the 1960s, several late 15th century paintings were uncovered which featured the themes of the Seven deadly sins and Judgment Day.

== Media gallery ==
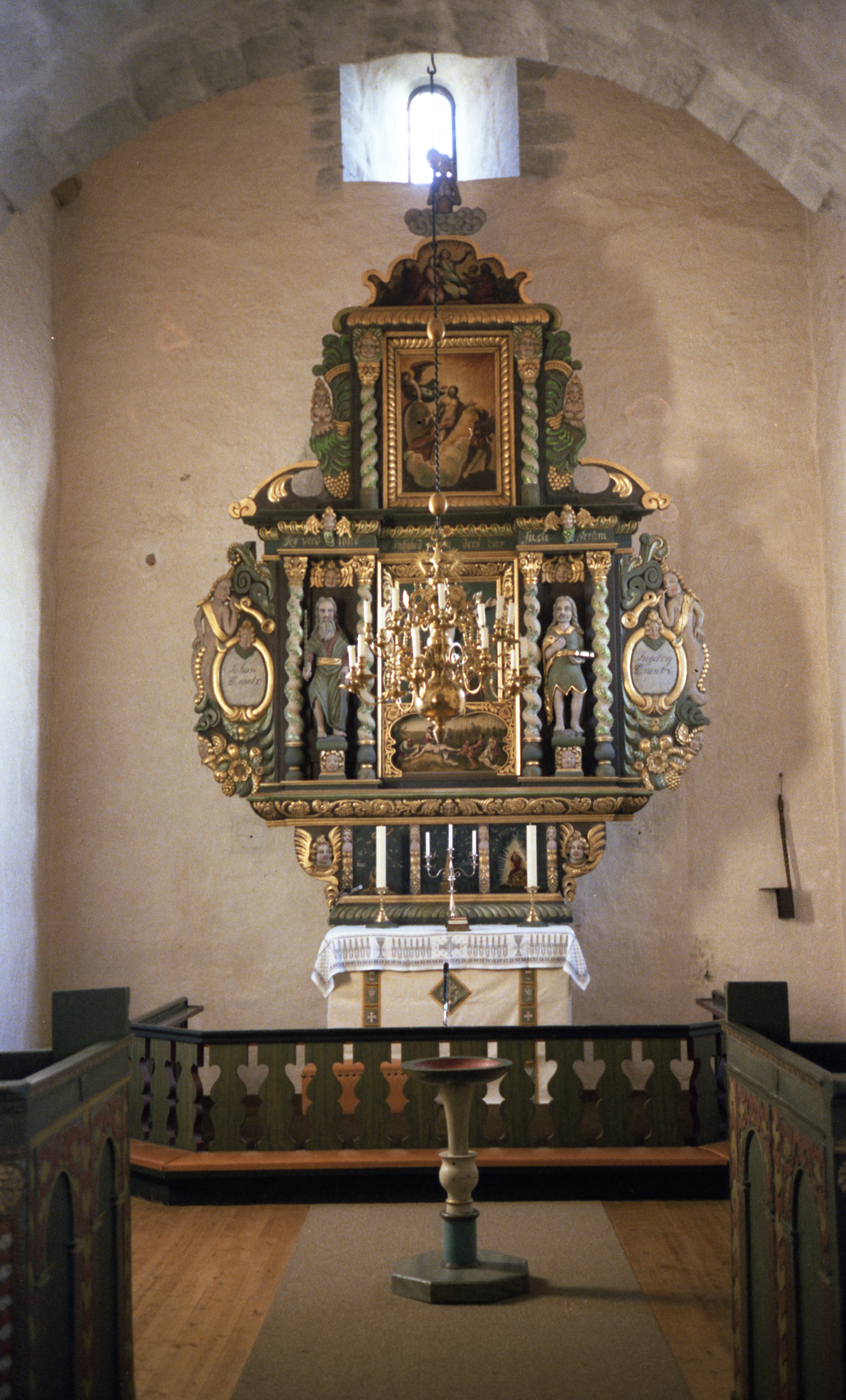
Church Altarpiece (1695)

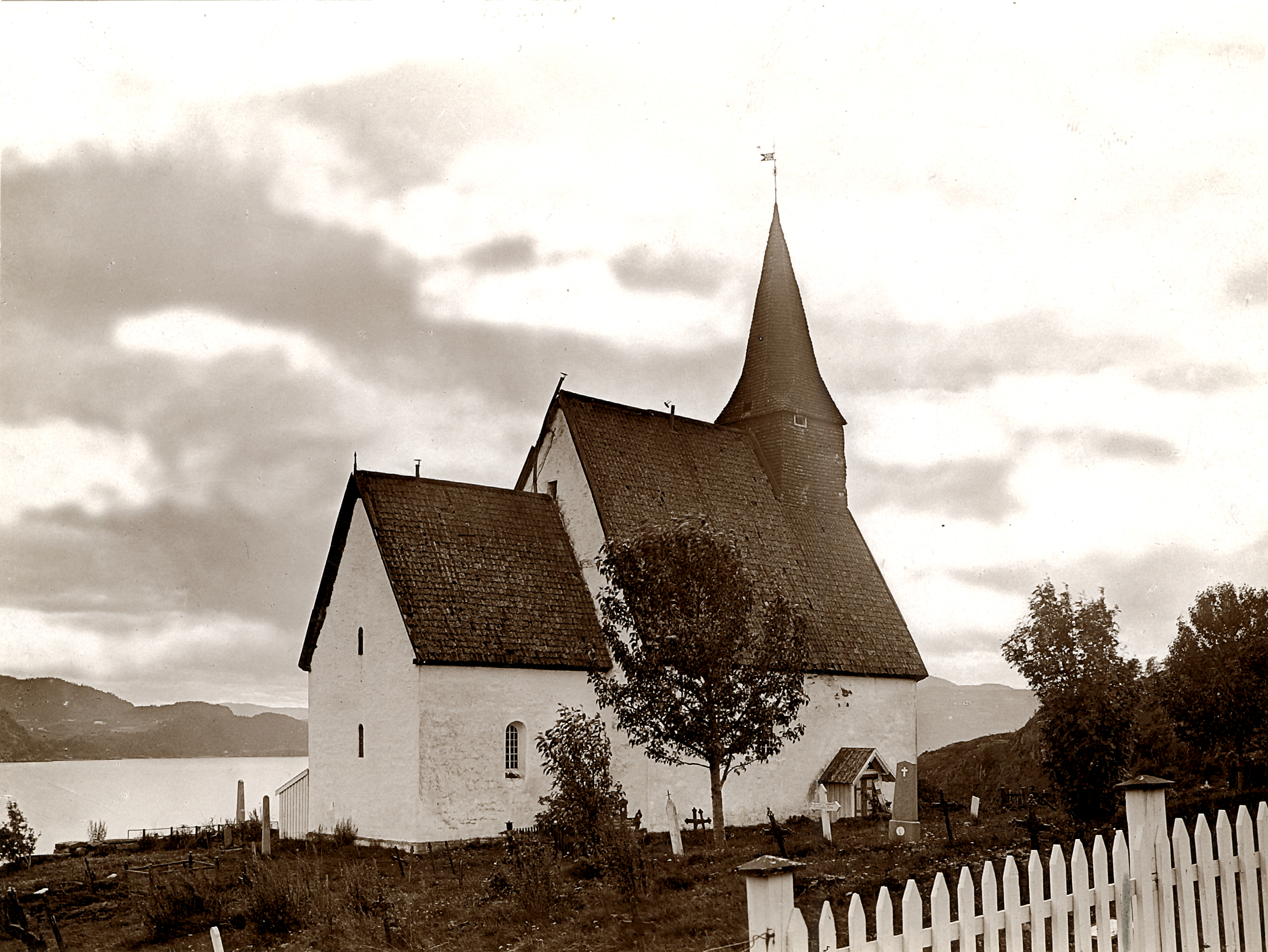
Exterior view

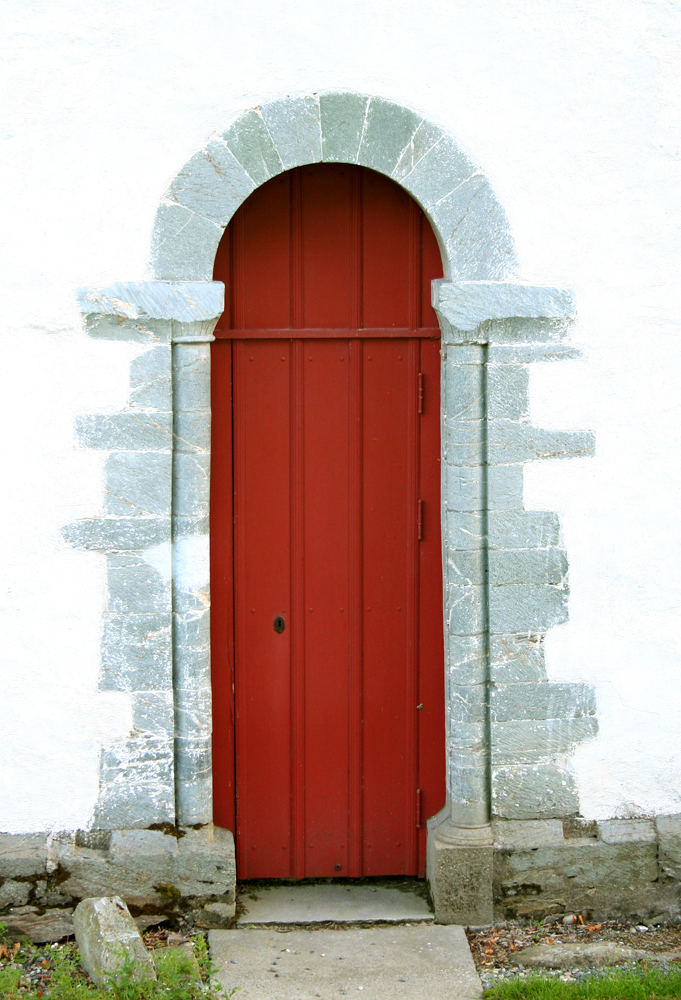
Door into the church

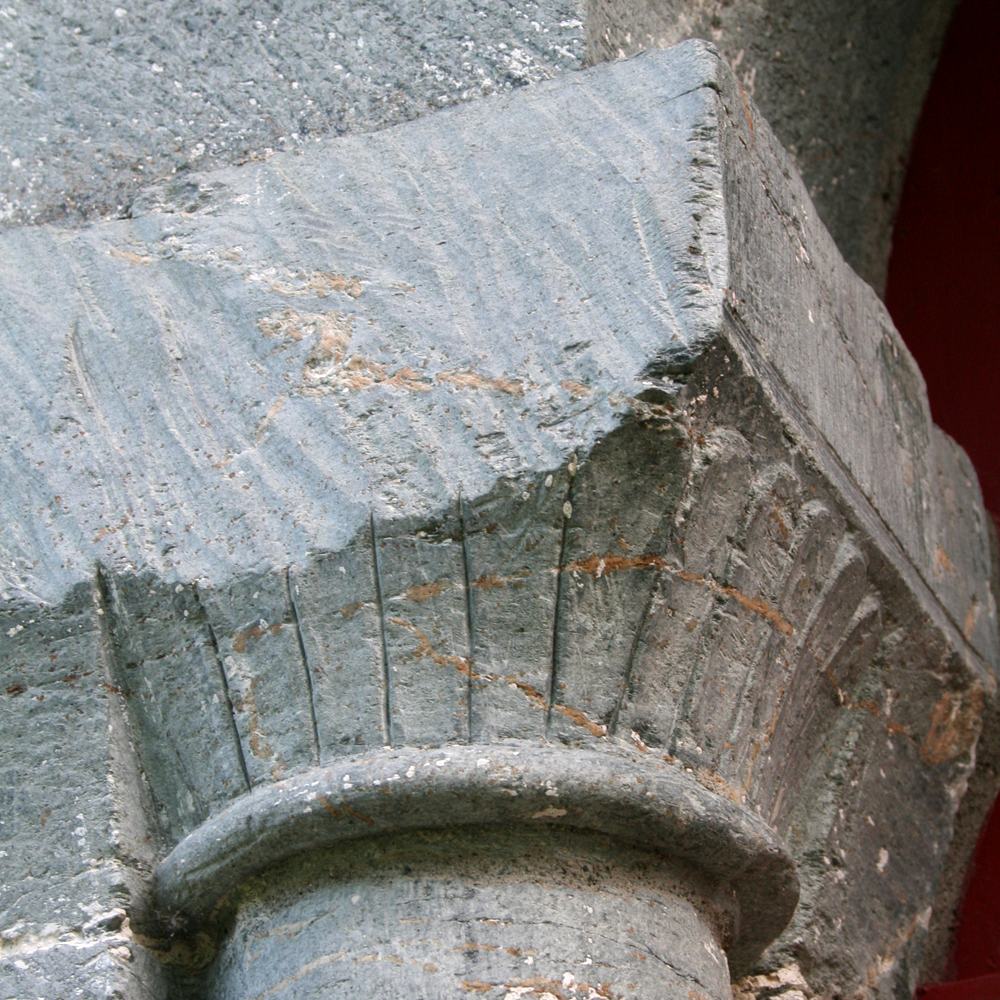
Exterior capital on a corner piller carving

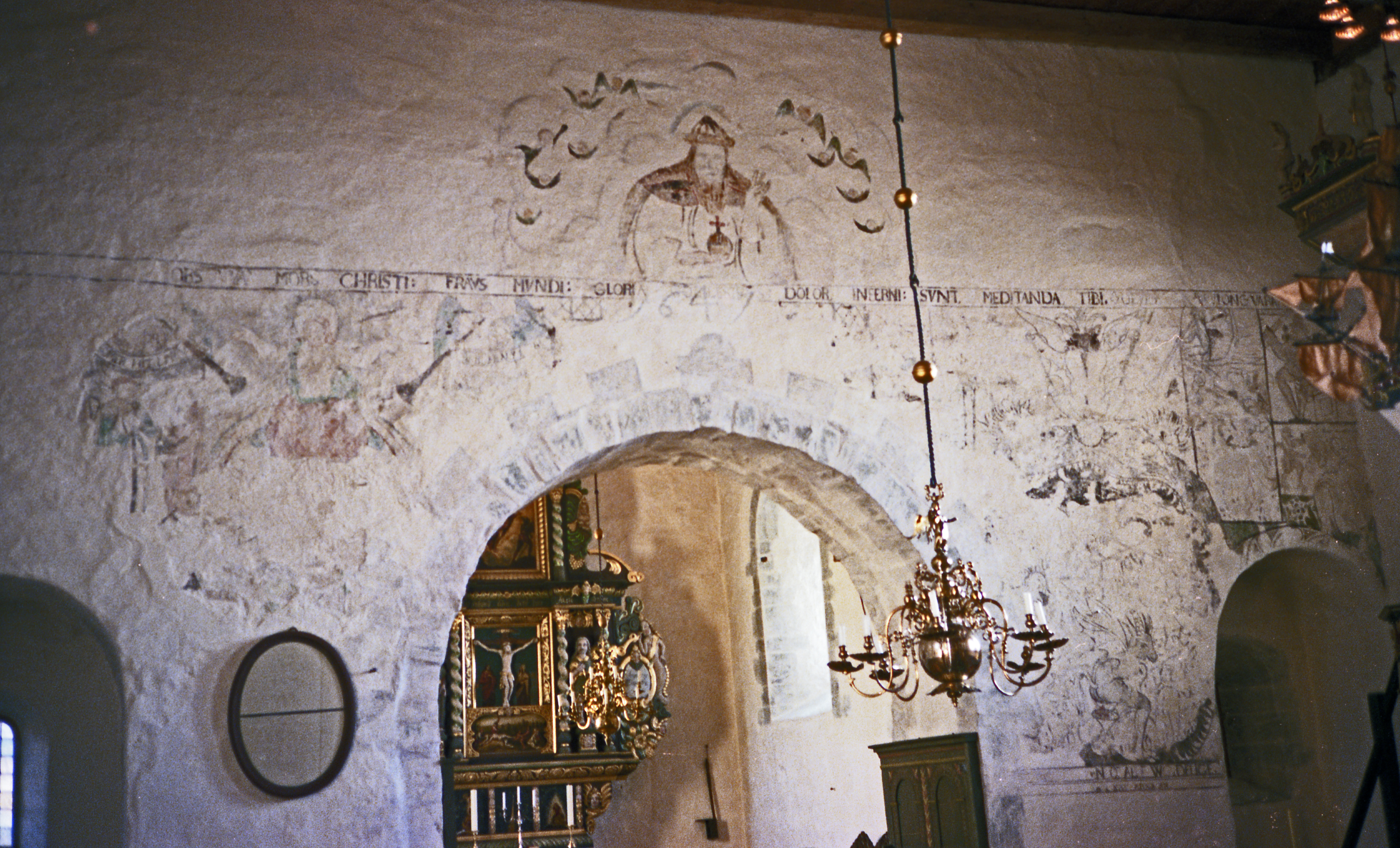
Mural of Judgment Day

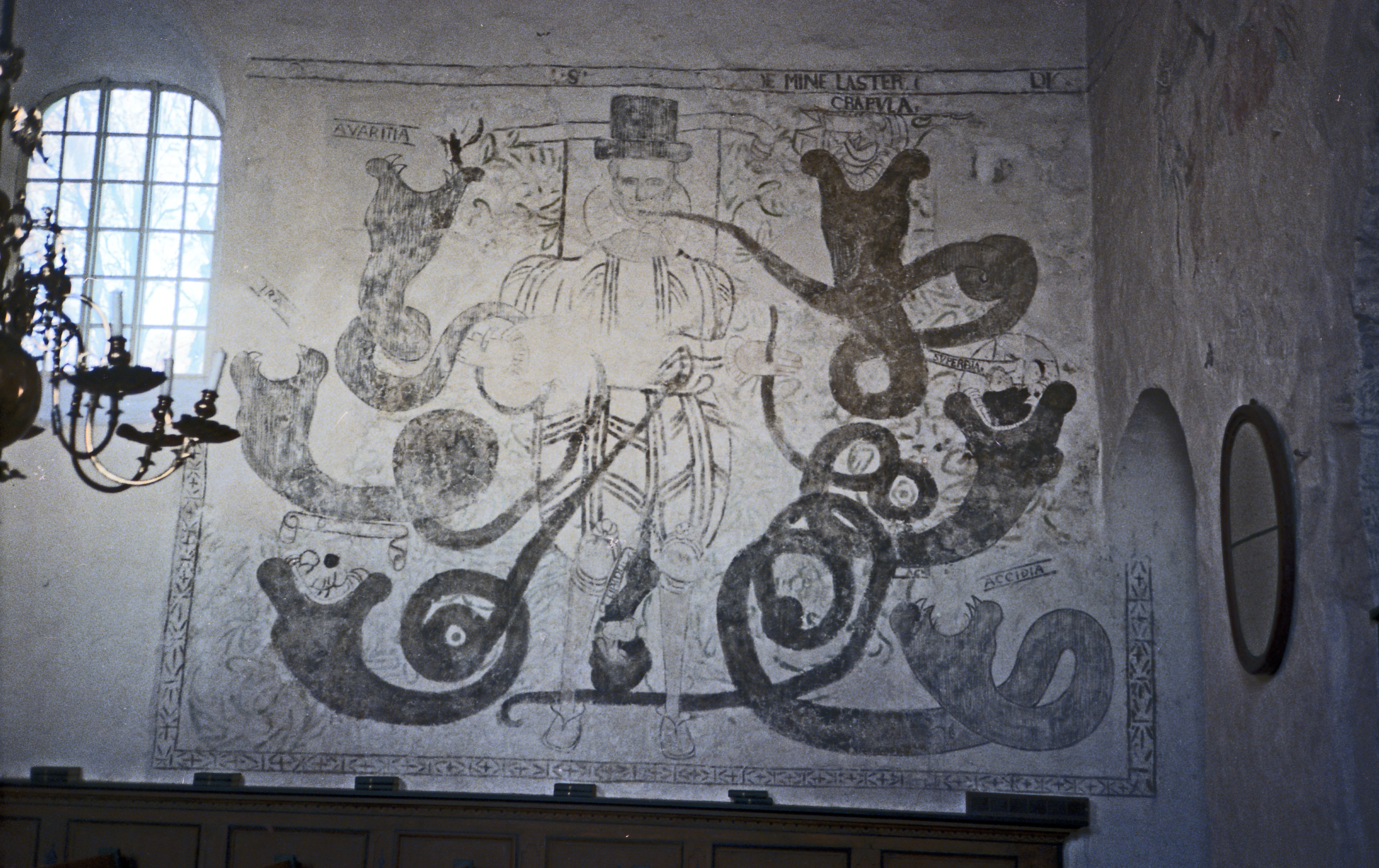
Mural of the Seven Deadly Sins

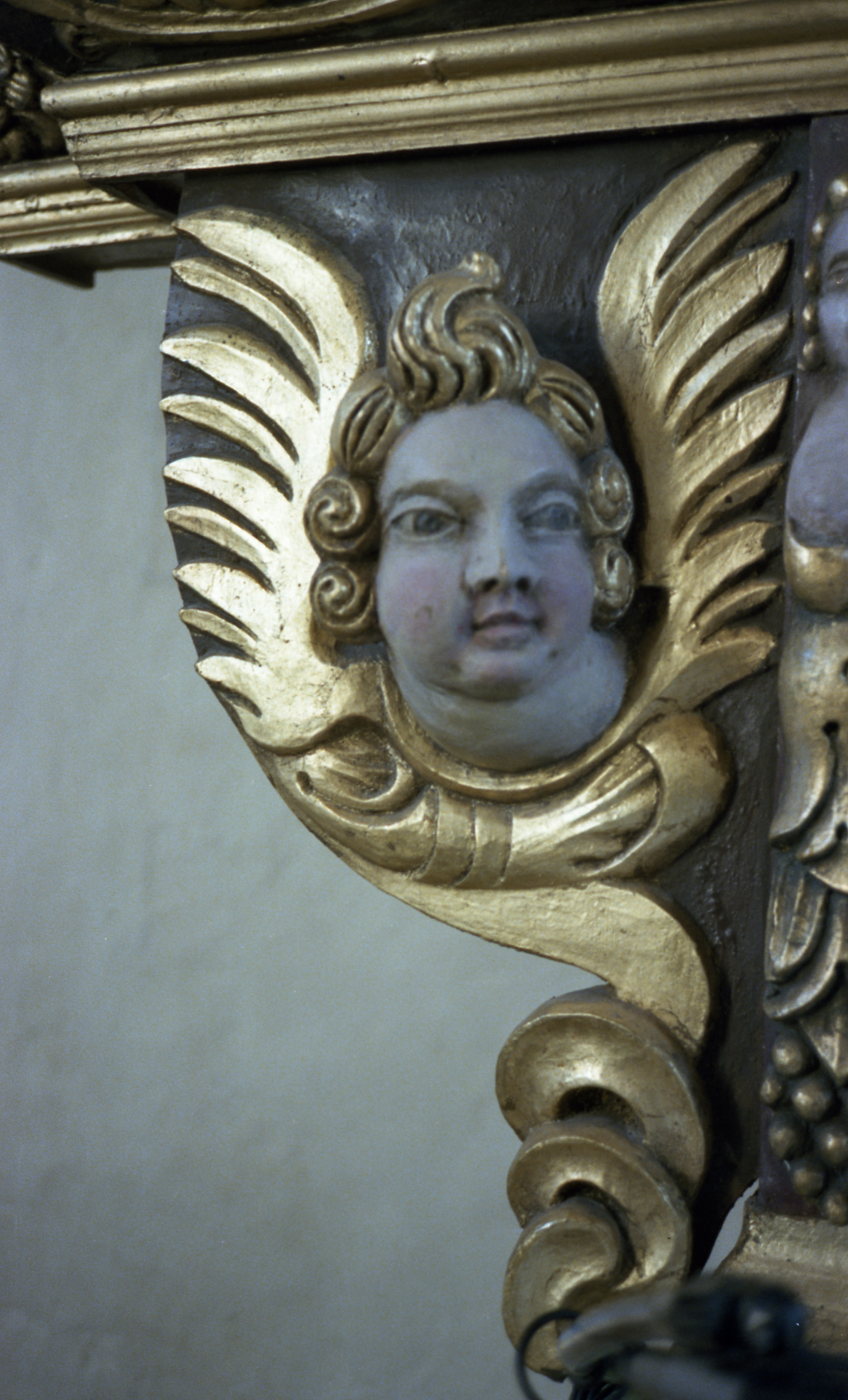
Detail of altarpiece

== See also ==
- List of churches in Nidaros
