= Sonic Studio =

Sonic Studio is an American company manufacturing digital audio production tools for engineering professionals. The company was created when Sonic Solutions divested itself of its audio product lines in order to concentrate on DVD and multimedia–oriented products.

== History ==
=== Overview ===
Under the auspices of Sonic Solutions, the Sonic Studio audio workstation has driven the professional production and delivery of commercial Compact Discs. The original “Sonic System” pioneered the desktop delivery of Red Book masters on recordable CD, in the same way that the original Macintosh and LaserWriter spawned the desktop publishing revolution. Prior to the introduction of the Sonic System, Compact Disc were assembled and premastered using bulky, expensive and unreliable U-matic videotape–based systems.

=== Early years ===
The Sonic System began life as research into real–time, computer–based audio production. The Audio Signal Processor (or ASP) hardware–based audio signal processor, designed by James A. Moorer, after work on the Hydra audio project at Stanford University’s CCRMA, was a proof of concept for what is now considered a digital audio workstation. The ASP's design started life in 1980 and was designed primarily for real–time, multichannel EQ and mixing. SoundDroid, an in–house project of Lucasfilm Ltd.’s Sprocket Systems that was later spun off as part of The Droid Works, was a hard disk–based, non–linear, second generation digital audio workstation that leveraged the research done on the ASP. Though the SoundDroid project was never commercialized and The Droid Works was later sold to Avid, the audio development team went on to first create the NoNOISE restoration system in 1987, hosted on a Motorola–powered SUN 1, the first true, general purpose computer “workstation,” which had been developed in cooperation with Lucasfilm. The SUN ran UNIX, developed by Bell Labs and refined at UC Berkeley. Sonic Studio’s current flagship product run on macOS, a modern version of that same UNIX variant, BSD Unix, that powered the original SUN workstation.

After evaluating the cost and complexity of the SUN workstations, the Sonic team decided to focus on a new platform: Apple Computer's Macintosh II. Later that year, the team used the Macintosh II to create the first production version of the Sonic Station. By 1988, the Sonic Station was in use at EMI Abbey Road and Finesplice in London, and at MCA in California. The Sonic Station helped restoration work and helped start a trend toward mining back catalogs. The system used a NuBus coprocessor equipped with four Motorola 56000–series digital signal processors.

Demand grew for a turnkey Compact Disc preparation system and, in 1990 with the addition of the world’s first CD-R product, Sony’s $30,000, two piece, E-1/W-1 Compact Disc-Recordable system in conjunction with START Lab’s new media, the complete Sonic System was born. After a few years of development, the product was renamed “SonicStudio”.

=== Present day ===
In 2002, Sonic Solutions decided to divest themselves of their original audio product line. To concentrate solely on the DVD content creation market, they formed a joint venture and, in 2004, that business was transferred to Big Endian, LLC to carry on the development, sales, and support of Sonic Solutions’ audio workstation products.

Headquartered in San Anselmo, CA, Sonic Studio, LLC designs software products that cater to professional audio users, offering PCM and DSD origination, editing, processing, and pre-mastering capabilities for CD, SACD, and digital media distribution. Products like NoNOISE noise and distortion reduction from Sonic Studio, LLC are used in DVD post-production and restoration applications.

=== Pioneering work ===
Over the years, development of the product lines have resulted in many breakthroughs now considered commonplace in the professional audio community. Some of the features and technologies brought to the pro audio market by Sonic Studio’s forebears include:

- graphical digital waveform displays
- 24 bit AES digital I/O
- SDIF-2 digital I/O
- 4–point editing model, borrowed from videotape editing paradigm
- integrated, 9 pin machine control
- integrated digital restoration tools
- multitasking DSP
- integrated “desktop” CD preparation
- the PreMaster CD delivery format
- ultra–high speed data network with multiuser, file–level read/write (Anderson 1993)
- 96 kHz & 192 kHz, single and double wire AES I/O support
- double precision internal signal processing (Moorer 1999)
- integrated DVD-Audio & SACD production (Moorer 1998)
