= Mastering (audio) =

Form of audio post-production

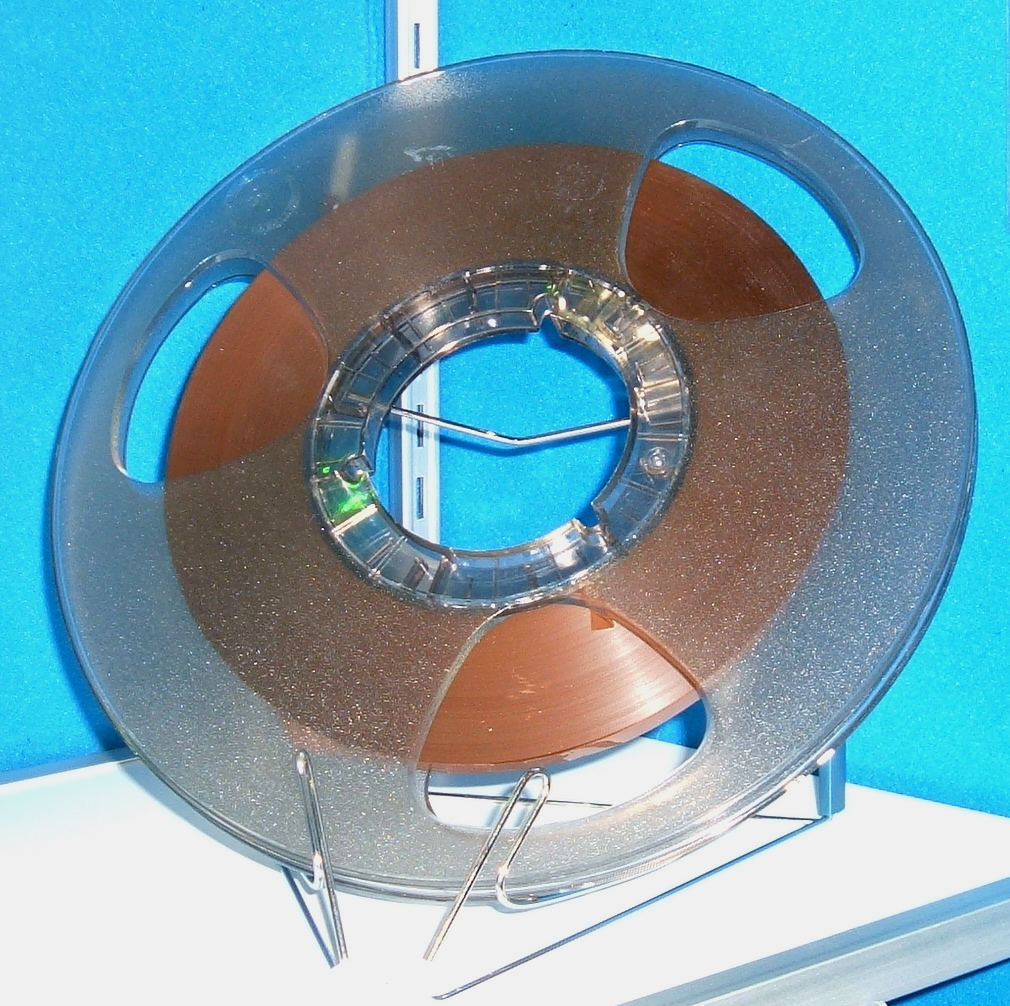
Magnetic tape was commonly used to create master copies.

Mastering is a form of audio post-production which is the process of preparing and transferring recorded audio from a source containing the final mix to a data storage device called a master recording, the source from which all copies will be produced (via methods such as pressing, duplication or replication). In recent years, digital masters have become common, although analog masters—such as audio tapes—are still being used by the manufacturing industry, particularly by a few engineers who specialize in analog mastering.

Mastering requires critical listening; however, software tools exist to facilitate the process. Results depend upon the intent of the engineer, their skills, the accuracy of the speaker monitors, and the listening environment. Mastering engineers often apply equalization and dynamic range compression in order to optimize sound translation on all playback systems. It is standard practice to make a copy of a master recording—known as a safety copy—in case the master is lost, damaged or stolen.

== History ==
=== Pre-1940s ===
In the earliest days of the recording industry, all phases of the recording and mastering were entirely mechanical processes. Performers sang or played into a large acoustic horn and the master recording was created by the transfer of acoustic energy from the diaphragm of the recording horn to the mastering lathe, typically located in an adjoining room. The cutting head, driven by the energy from the horn, inscribed a modulated groove into the surface of a rotating cylinder or disc. These masters were usually made from either a soft metal alloy or from wax; this gave rise to the colloquial term waxing, referring to the cutting of a record.

After the introduction of the microphone and electronic amplifier in the mid-1920s, the mastering process became electro-mechanical, and electrically driven mastering lathes came into use for cutting master discs (the cylinder format by then having been superseded). Until the introduction of tape recording, master recordings were almost always cut direct-to-disc. Only a small minority of recordings were mastered using previously recorded material sourced from other discs.

=== Emergence of magnetic tape ===
In the late 1940s, the recording industry was revolutionized by the introduction of magnetic tape. Magnetic tape was invented for recording sound by Fritz Pfleumer in 1928 in Germany, based on the invention of magnetic wire recording by Valdemar Poulsen in 1898. Not until the end of World War II could the technology be found outside Europe. The introduction of magnetic tape recording enabled master discs to be cut separately in time and space from the actual recording process.

Although tape and other technical advances dramatically improved the audio quality of commercial recordings in the post-war years, the basic constraints of the electro-mechanical mastering process remained, and the inherent physical limitations of the main commercial recording media—the 78 rpm disc and later the 7-inch 45 rpm single and 33-1/3 rpm LP record—meant that the audio quality, dynamic range, (Note: Dynamic range was limited by the fact that if the mastering level was set too high, the cutting head might be damaged during the cutting process or the stylus may jump out of the groove during playback.) and running time (Note: Running times were constrained by the diameter of the disc and the density with which grooves could be inscribed on the surface without cutting into each other.) of master discs were still limited compared to later media such as the compact disc.

=== Electro-mechanical mastering process ===
From the 1950s until the advent of digital recording in the late 1970s, the mastering process typically went through several stages. Once the studio recording on multi-track tape was complete, a final mix was prepared and dubbed down to the master tape, usually either a single-track mono or two-track stereo tape. Prior to the cutting of the master disc, the master tape was often subjected to further electronic treatment by a specialist mastering engineer.

After the advent of tape it was found that, especially for pop recordings, master recordings could be made so that the resulting record would sound better. This was done by making fine adjustments to the amplitude of sound at different frequency bands (equalization) prior to the cutting of the master disc.

In large recording companies such as EMI, the mastering process was usually controlled by specialist staff technicians who were conservative in their work practices. These big companies were often reluctant to make changes to their recording and production processes. For example, EMI was very slow in taking up innovations in multi-track recording (Note: In multi-track recording each signal input is recorded to its own track on a multi-track recorder. This multi-track tape is mixed down to a mono or stereo master tape. A multi-track tape may be remixed many times, in different ways, by different engineers, giving the possibility of several masters (mono version, stereo version, LP version, AM radio version, single version, etc.).) and did not install 8-track recorders in their Abbey Road Studios until the late 1960s, more than a decade after the first commercial 8-track recorders were installed by American independent studios.

=== Digital technology ===
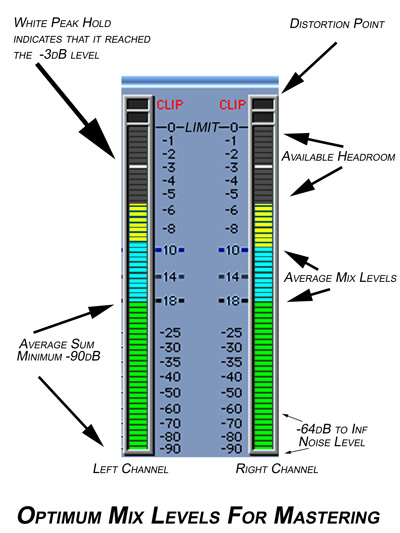
Optimum Digital Levels with respect to the Full Digital Scale (dBFSD)

In the 1990s, electro-mechanical processes were largely superseded by digital technology, with digital recordings stored on hard disk drives or digital tape and mastered to CD. The digital audio workstation (DAW) became common in many mastering facilities, allowing the off-line manipulation of recorded audio via a graphical user interface (GUI). Although many digital processing tools are common during mastering, it is also very common to use analog media and processing equipment for the mastering stage. Just as in other areas of audio, the benefits and drawbacks of digital technology compared to analog technology are still a matter for debate. However, in the field of audio mastering, the debate is usually over the use of digital versus analog signal processing rather than the use of digital technology for storage of audio.

Digital systems have higher performance and allow mixing to be performed at lower maximum levels. When mixing to 24-bits with peaks between −3 and −10 dBFS on a mix, the mastering engineer has enough headroom to process and produce a final master. Mastering engineers recommend leaving enough headroom on the mix to avoid distortion. The reduction of dynamics by the mix or mastering engineer has resulted in a loudness war in commercial recordings.

== Process ==
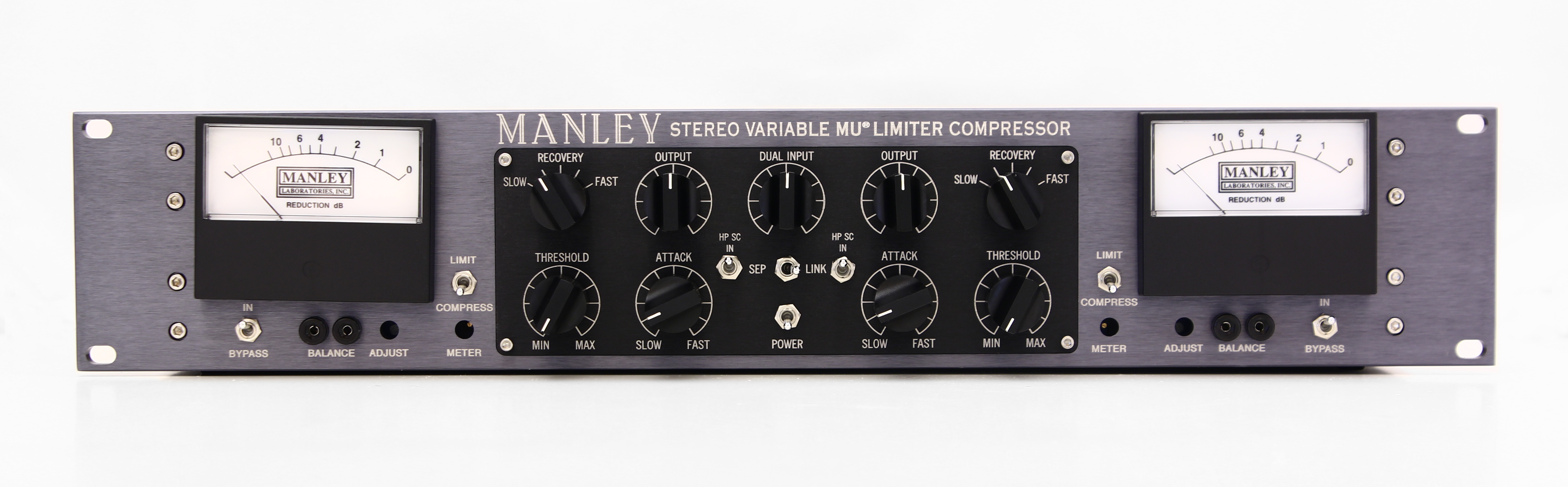
A common mastering processor for dynamic range compression

The source material, ideally at the original resolution, is processed using equalization, compression, limiting and other processes. Additional operations, such as editing, specifying the gaps between tracks, adjusting level, fading in and out, noise reduction and other signal restoration and enhancement processes can also be applied as part of the mastering stage. The source material is put in the proper order, commonly referred to as assembly (or 'track') sequencing. These operations prepare the music for either digital or analog, e.g. vinyl, replication.

If the material is destined for vinyl release, additional processing, such as dynamic range reduction or frequency-dependent stereo–to–mono fold-down and equalization, may be applied to compensate for the limitations of that medium. For compact disc release, start of track, end of track, and indexes are defined for playback navigation along with International Standard Recording Code (ISRC) and other information necessary to replicate a CD. Vinyl LP and cassettes have their own pre-duplication requirements for a finished master. Subsequently, it is rendered either to a physical medium, such as a CD-R or DVD-R, or to computer files, such as a Disc Description Protocol (DDP) file set or an ISO image. Regardless of what delivery method is chosen, the replicator factory will transfer the audio to a glass master that will generate metal stampers for replication.

The process of audio mastering varies depending on the specific needs of the audio to be processed. Mastering engineers need to examine the types of input media, the expectations of the source producer or recipient, the limitations of the end medium and process the subject accordingly. General rules of thumb can rarely be applied.

Steps of the process typically include the following:

1. Transferring the recorded audio tracks into the Digital Audio Workstation (DAW)
2. Sequence the separate songs or tracks as they will appear on the final release
3. Adjust the length of the silence between songs
4. Process or sweeten audio to maximize the sound quality for the intended medium (e.g., applying specific equalization for vinyl)
5. Transfer the audio to the final master format (CD-ROM, half-inch reel tape, PCM 1630 U-matic tape, etc.)

Examples of possible actions taken during mastering:

1. Editing minor flaws
2. Applying noise reduction to eliminate clicks, dropouts, hum and hiss
3. Adjusting stereo width
4. Equalize audio across tracks for the purpose of optimized frequency distribution
5. Adjust volume
6. Dynamic range compression or expansion
7. Peak limit
8. Inserting ISRCs and CD text
9. Arranging tracks in their final sequential order
10. Fading out the ending of each song
11. Dither

== Engineer ==
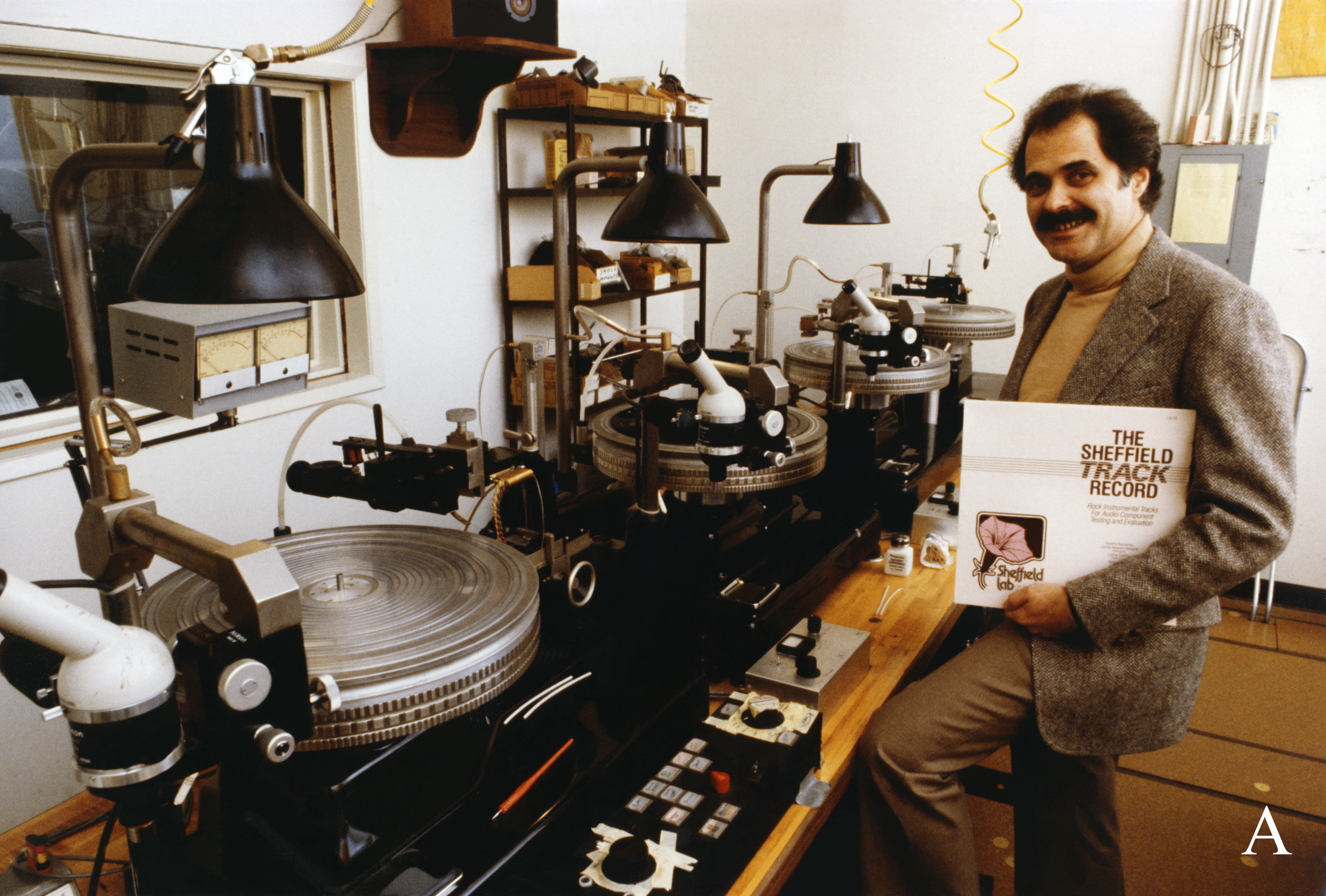
Mastering engineer Doug Sax with four disc cutting lathes

A mastering engineer is a person skilled in the practice of taking audio (typically musical content) that has been previously mixed in either the analogue or digital domain as mono, stereo, or multichannel formats and preparing it for use in distribution, whether by physical media such as a CD, vinyl record, or as some method of streaming audio.

=== Education and experience ===
The mastering engineer is responsible for a final edit of a product and preparation for manufacturing copies. Although there are no official requirements to work as an audio mastering engineer, practitioners often have comprehensive domain knowledge of audio engineering, and in many cases, may hold an audio or acoustic engineering degree. Most audio engineers master music or speech audio material. The best mastering engineers might possess arrangement and production skills, allowing them to troubleshoot mix issues and improve the final sound. Generally, good mastering skills are based on experience, resulting from many years of practice.

=== Equipment ===
Generally, mastering engineers use a combination of specialized audio-signal processors, low-distortion, high-bandwidth loudspeakers (and corresponding amplifiers with which to drive them), within a dedicated, acoustically-optimized playback environment. The equipment and processors used within the field of mastering are almost entirely dedicated to the purpose; engineered to a high standard, often possessing low signal-to-noise ratios (at nominal operating levels) and, in many cases, incorporating parameter recall, such as indented potentiometers, or in some more sophisticated designs, via a digital controller. Some advocates for digital software claim that plug-ins are capable of processing audio in a mastering context, though without the same degree of signal degradation as those introduced by processors within the analog domain. The quality of the results varies according to the algorithms used within these processors, which in some cases can introduce distortions entirely exclusive to the digital domain.

Real-time analyzers, phase oscilloscopes, and also peak, RMS, VU and K meters are frequently used within the audio analysis stage of the process as a means of rendering a visual representation of the audio, or signal, being analyzed.

=== Aspects of their work ===
Most mastering engineer accolades are given for their ability to make a mix consistent with respect to subjective factors based on the perception of listeners, regardless of their playback systems and the environment. This is a challenging task due to the variety of systems now available and their impact on the apparent qualitative attributes of the recording. For instance, a recording that sounds great on one speaker/amplifier combination playing CD audio may sound drastically different on a computer-based system playing back a low-bitrate MP3. Some engineers maintain that the main mastering engineer's task is to improve upon playback systems' translations, while the position of others is to make a sonic impact.

=== Notable audio mastering engineers ===
- Brad Blackwood
- Greg Calbi
- Tony Dawsey
- P. A. Deepak
- Steve Fallone
- Greg Fulginiti
- Brian Gardner
- Chris Gehringer
- Kevin Gray
- Bernie Grundman
- Steve Hoffman
- Ted Jensen
- Bob Katz
- Heba Kadry
- Emily Lazar
- Bob Ludwig
- Stephen Marcussen
- George Marino
- Randy Merrill
- Mandy Parnell
- George "Porky" Peckham
- Eric Pillai
- Shadab Rayeen
- Doug Sax
- H. Sridhar
- Ray Staff
- Rudy Van Gelder
- Howie Weinberg
- Leon Zervos

== See also ==
- Grammy Award for Best Surround Sound Album
- PMCD
- Loudness war
- Album era
- Remaster
- 2008 Universal Studios fire
