= A Day in the Life =

1967 song by the Beatles

- US sheet music cover

Song by the Beatles

from the album Sgt. Pepper's Lonely Hearts Club Band
- Released: 26 May 1967
- Recorded: 19 January – 22 February 1967
- Studio: EMI, London
- Genre: Art rock; psychedelic rock; orchestral pop
- Length: 5:35
- Label: Parlophone (UK); Capitol (US)
- Songwriter: Lennon–McCartney
- Producer: George Martin

Music video
- "A Day in the Life" on YouTube

Audio sample
- file; help

"A Day in the Life" is a song by the English rock band the Beatles that was released as the final track of their 1967 album Sgt. Pepper's Lonely Hearts Club Band. Credited to Lennon–McCartney, the opening and closing sections of the song were mainly written by John Lennon, with Paul McCartney primarily contributing the song's middle section. All four Beatles shaped the final arrangement of the song.

Lennon's lyrics were mainly inspired by contemporary newspaper articles, including a report on the death of Guinness heir Tara Browne. The recording includes two passages of orchestral glissandos that were partly improvised in the avant-garde style. In the song's middle segment, McCartney recalls his younger years, which included riding the bus, smoking, and going to class. Following the second crescendo, the song ends with one of the most famous chords in popular music history, played on several keyboards, that sustains for forty five seconds.

A reputed drug reference in the line "I'd love to turn you on" resulted in the song initially being banned from broadcast by the BBC. Jeff Beck, Chris Cornell, Barry Gibb, the Fall and Phish are among the artists who have covered the song. The song inspired the creation of the Deep Note, the audio trademark for the THX film company. It remains one of the most influential and celebrated songs in popular music, appearing on many lists of the greatest songs of all time, and being commonly appraised as the Beatles' finest song.

== Background ==
John Lennon wrote the melody and most of the lyrics to the verses of "A Day in the Life" in mid-January 1967. Soon afterwards, he presented the song to Paul McCartney, who contributed a middle-eight section. According to Lennon, McCartney also contributed the pivotal line "I'd love to turn you on". In a 1970 interview, Lennon discussed their collaboration on the song:

Paul and I were definitely working together, especially on "A Day in the Life" ... The way we wrote a lot of the time: you'd write the good bit, the part that was easy, like "I read the news today" or whatever it was, then when you got stuck or whenever it got hard, instead of carrying on, you just drop it; then we would meet each other, and I would sing half, and he would be inspired to write the next bit and vice versa. He was a bit shy about it because I think he thought it's already a good song ... So we were doing it in his room with the piano. He said "Should we do this?" "Yeah, let's do that."

In 1968, Lennon said, "It was a good piece of work between Paul and me. I had the 'I read the news today' bit, and it turned Paul on, because now and then we really turn each other on with a bit of song, and he just said 'yeah' – bang bang, like that."

According to author Ian MacDonald, "A Day in the Life" was strongly informed by Lennon's LSD-inspired revelations, in that the song "concerned 'reality' only to the extent that this had been revealed by LSD to be largely in the eye of the beholder". Having long resisted Lennon and George Harrison's insistence that he join them and Ringo Starr in trying LSD, McCartney took it for the first time in late 1966. This experience contributed to the Beatles' willingness to experiment on Sgt. Pepper and to Lennon and McCartney returning to a level of collaboration that had been somewhat absent.

== Lyrics ==
=== Tara Browne ===
Music critic Tim Riley says that in "A Day in the Life", Lennon uses the same lyrical device introduced in "Strawberry Fields Forever", whereby free-form lyrics allow a greater freedom of expression and create a "supernatural calm". According to Lennon, the inspiration for the first two verses was the death of Tara Browne, the 21-year-old heir to the Guinness fortune who had crashed his car on 18 December 1966. Browne was a friend of Lennon and McCartney, and had instigated McCartney's first experience with LSD. Lennon adapted the song's verse lyrics from a story in the 17 January 1967 edition of the Daily Mail, which reported the ruling on a custody action over Browne's two young children.

During a writing session at McCartney's house in north London, Lennon and McCartney fine-tuned the lyrics, using an approach that author Howard Sounes likens to the cut-up technique popularised by William S. Burroughs. "I didn't copy the accident," Lennon said. "Tara didn't blow his mind out, but it was in my mind when I was writing that verse. The details of the accident in the song – not noticing traffic lights and a crowd forming at the scene – were similarly part of the fiction." In 1997, McCartney expounded on the subject: "The verse about the politician blowing his mind out in a car we wrote together. It has been attributed to Tara Browne, the Guinness heir, which I don't believe is the case, certainly as we were writing it, I was not attributing it to Tara in my head. In John's head it might have been. In my head I was imagining a politician bombed out on drugs who'd stopped at some traffic lights and didn't notice that the lights had changed. The 'blew his mind' was purely a drugs reference, nothing to do with a car crash." But in 2021, McCartney recalled the inspiration for this part of the composition as follows: "That was around this same time, when I was twenty-something and going out on the moped from my dad's house to Betty's house. I was taking a friend, Tara Guinness. He died later in a car accident. He was a nice boy. I wrote about him in 'A Day in the Life': 'He blew his mind out in a car / He didn't notice that the lights had changed'."

=== "4,000 holes" ===
Lennon, who wrote the song's final verse, was inspired by a Far & Near news brief, in the same 17 January edition of the Daily Mail that had inspired the first two verses. Under the headline "The holes in our roads", the brief stated: "There are 4,000 holes in the road in Blackburn, Lancashire, or one twenty-sixth of a hole per person, according to a council survey. If Blackburn is typical, there are two million holes in Britain's roads and 300,000 in London."

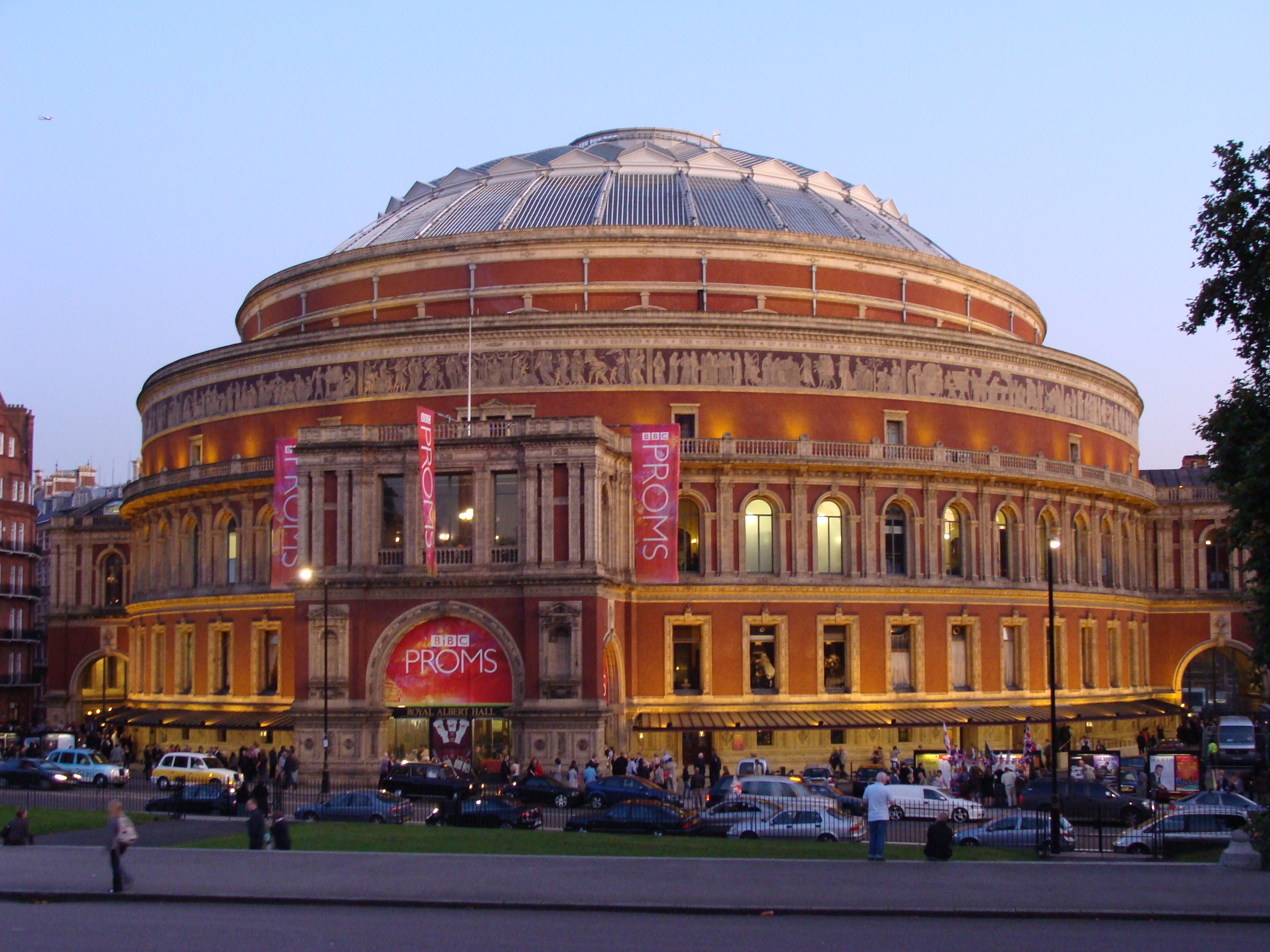
In his lyrics, Lennon mentions the Royal Albert Hall, a symbol of Victorian-era London and a concert venue usually associated with classical music performances.

The story had been sold to the Daily Mail in Manchester by Ron Kennedy of the Star News agency in Blackburn. Kennedy had noticed a Lancashire Evening Telegraph story about road excavations and in a telephone call to the Borough Engineer's department had checked the annual number of holes in the road. Lennon had a problem with the words of the final verse, however, not being able to think of how to connect "Now they know how many holes it takes to" and "the Albert Hall". His friend Terry Doran suggested that the holes would "fill" the Albert Hall, and the lyric was eventually used.

=== Drug culture ===
McCartney said about the line "I'd love to turn you on", which concludes both verse sections: "This was the time of Tim Leary's 'Turn on, tune in, drop out' and we wrote, 'I'd love to turn you on.' John and I gave each other a knowing look: 'Uh-huh, it's a drug song. You know that, don't you?'" (Note: While McCartney remembered writing the lyric "I'd love to turn you on" with Lennon, Lennon, in his 1980 Playboy interview with David Sheff, credited it as being McCartney's alone, stating, "Paul's contribution was the beautiful little lick in the song, 'I'd love to turn you on' that he'd had floating around in his head and he couldn't use for anything. I thought it was a damn good piece of work." In a 1972 interview, he stated: "I think Paul wrote 'I'd love to turn you on.'") George Martin, the Beatles' producer, commented that he had always suspected that the line "found my way upstairs and had a smoke" was a drug reference, recalling how the Beatles would "disappear and have a little puff", presumably of marijuana, but not in front of him. "When [Martin] was doing his TV programme on Pepper", McCartney recalled later, "he asked me, 'Do you know what caused Pepper?' I said, 'In one word, George, drugs. Pot.' And George said, 'No, no. But you weren't on it all the time.' 'Yes, we were.' Sgt. Pepper was a drug album." (Note: In a discussion with Harrison, Martin complained about Sgt. Pepper being deemed a "drugs album", since he himself never partook. Harrison told him that they used to spike his coffee with stimulants to ensure he stayed awake through the long, overnight sessions.)

=== Other reference points ===
Author Neil Sinyard attributed the second-verse line "The English Army had just won the war" to Lennon's role in the film How I Won the War, which he had filmed during September and October 1966. Sinyard said: "It's hard to think of [the verse] without automatically associating it with Richard Lester's film."

The middle-eight provided by McCartney was written as a wistful recollection of his younger years, which included riding the 82 bus to school, smoking, and going to class. This theme – the Beatles' youth in Liverpool – matched that of "Penny Lane" (named after the street in Liverpool) and "Strawberry Fields Forever" (named after the orphanage near Lennon's childhood home in Liverpool), two songs written for the album but instead released as a double A-side. According to Beatles scholar Kenneth Womack, another lyrical influence for McCartney's bridge section was the jazz standard "On the Sunny Side of the Street".

== Musical structure and development ==
=== Basic track ===
The Beatles began recording the song, with a working title of "In the Life of ...", at EMI's Studio Two on 19 January 1967. The line-up as they rehearsed the track was Lennon on piano, McCartney on Hammond organ, Harrison on acoustic guitar, and Starr on drums. The band then taped four takes of the rhythm track, by which point Lennon had switched to acoustic guitar and McCartney to piano, with Harrison now playing maracas.

As a link between the end of the second verse and the start of McCartney's middle-eight, the band included a 24-bar bridge. At first, the Beatles were not sure how to fill this link section. At the conclusion of the session on 19 January, the transition consisted of a simple repeated piano chord and the voice of assistant Mal Evans counting out the bars. Evans' voice was treated with gradually increasing amounts of echo. The 24-bar bridge ended with the sound of an alarm clock triggered by Evans. Although the original intent was to edit out the ringing alarm clock when the section was filled in, it complemented McCartney's piece – which begins with the line "Woke up, fell out of bed" – so the decision was made to keep the sound. (Note: Martin later said that editing it out would have been unfeasible in any case.) A second transition follows McCartney's final line of the middle eight ("I went into a dream") consisting of vocalised "aah"s that link to the song's final verse. (Accounts differ as to which of the Beatles sang it.)

The track was refined with remixing and additional parts added on 20 January and 3 February. During the latter session, McCartney and Starr re-recorded their contributions on bass guitar and drums, respectively. Starr later highlighted his fills on the song as typical of an approach whereby "I try to become an instrument; play the mood of the song. For example, 'Four thousand holes in Blackburn, Lancashire,' – boom ba bom. I try to show that; the disenchanting mood." As on the 1966 track "Rain", music journalist Ben Edmonds recognises Starr's playing as reflective of his empathy with Lennon's songwriting. In Edmonds' description, the drumming on "A Day in the Life" "embod[ies] psychedelic drift – mysterious, surprising, without losing sight of its rhythmic role".

=== Orchestra ===
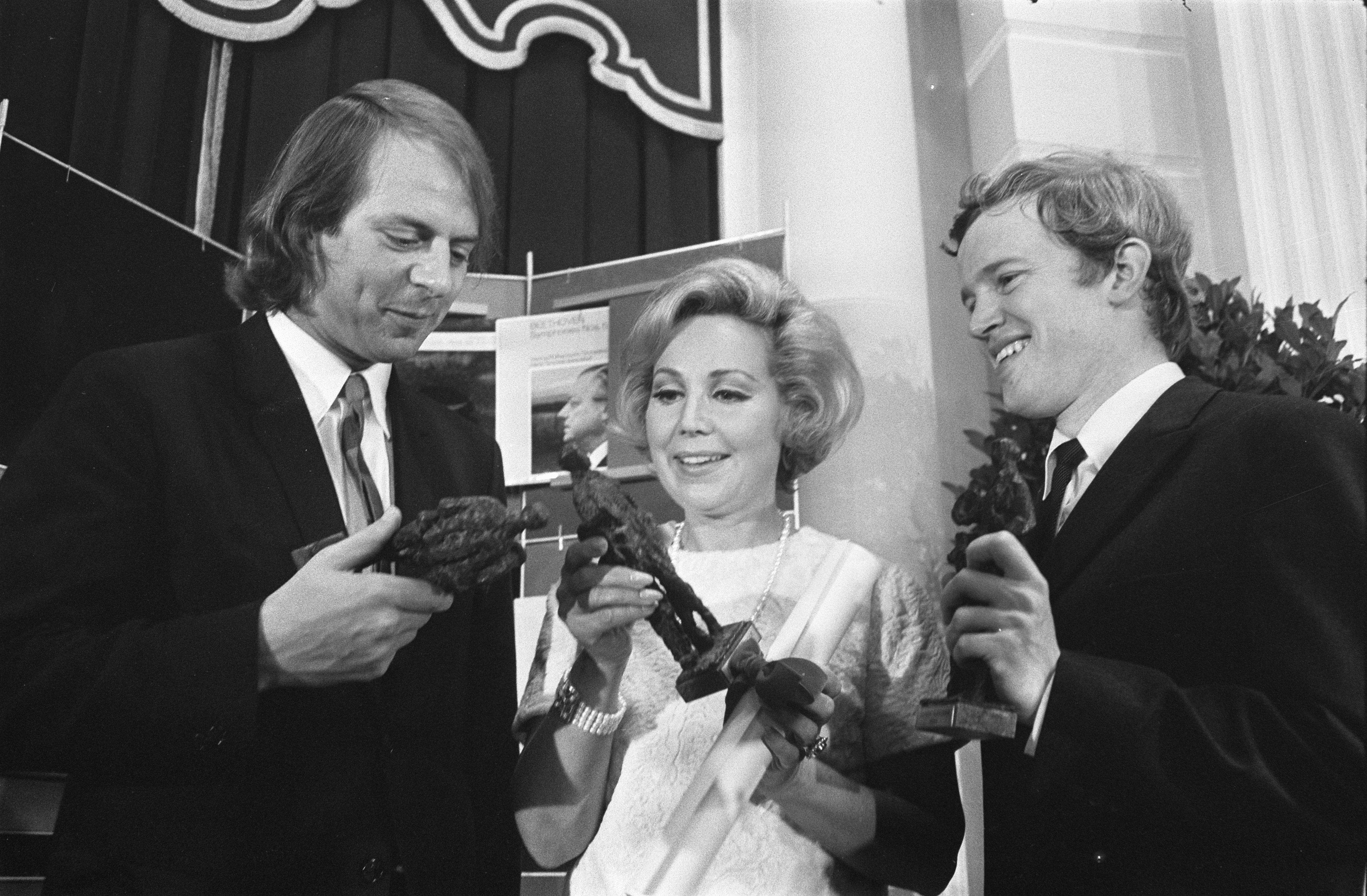
The song's orchestral segments reflect the influence of avant-garde composers such as Karlheinz Stockhausen (left, at an awards ceremony in Amsterdam in October 1969).

The orchestral portions of "A Day in the Life" reflect Lennon and McCartney's interest in the work of avant-garde composers such as Karlheinz Stockhausen, Luciano Berio and John Cage. (Note: According to Gene Sculatti, writing in Jazz & Pop in 1968, the influence of the Beach Boys' "Good Vibrations", as the "ultimate in-studio production trip", was apparent in songs such as "A Day in the Life". Beatles biographer Jonathon Gould says that "of the many ambitious pop singles released during the fall of 1966, none had a stronger influence on the Beatles than the Beach Boys' 'Good Vibrations'".) To fill the empty 24-bar middle section, Lennon's request to George Martin was that the orchestra should provide "a tremendous build-up, from nothing up to something absolutely like the end of the world". McCartney suggested having the musicians improvise over the segment. Concerned that classically trained musicians would be unable to do this, Martin wrote a loose score for the section. Using the rhythm implied by Lennon's staggered intonation on the words "turn you on", the score was an extended, atonal crescendo that encouraged the musicians to improvise within the defined framework. The orchestral part was recorded on 10 February 1967 in Studio One at EMI Studios, with Martin and McCartney conducting a 40-piece orchestra. The recording session was completed at a total cost of £367 (equivalent to £5,848 in 2025) for the players, an extravagance at the time. Martin later described explaining his score to the puzzled orchestra:

What I did there was to write ... the lowest possible note for each of the instruments in the orchestra. At the end of the twenty-four bars, I wrote the highest note ... near a chord of E major. Then I put a squiggly line right through the twenty-four bars, with reference points to tell them roughly what note they should have reached during each bar ... Of course, they all looked at me as though I were completely mad.

McCartney had originally wanted a 90-piece orchestra, but this proved impossible. Instead, the semi-improvised segment was recorded several times, filling a separate four-track tape machine, and the four different recordings were overdubbed into a single massive crescendo. The results were successful; in the final edit of the song, the orchestral bridge is reprised after the final verse.

The Beatles hosted the orchestral session as a happening, which had been a contemporary countercultural trend, drawing from performance art; they invited Mick Jagger, Marianne Faithfull, Keith Richards, Brian Jones, Donovan, Pattie Boyd, Michael Nesmith, and members of the psychedelic design collective the Fool as guests. Overseen by Tony Bramwell of NEMS Enterprises, the event was filmed for use in a projected television special that never materialised. (Note: Although the special did not take place, portions of the film appear on the Beatles Anthology DVD and in the "A Day in the Life" music video included in the deluxe version of the Beatles compilation 1, titled 1+.) Reflecting the Beatles' taste for experimentation and the avant garde, the orchestra players were asked to wear formal dress and then given a costume piece as a contrast with this attire. This resulted in different players wearing anything from fake noses to fake stick-on nipples. Martin recalled that the lead violinist performed wearing a gorilla paw, while a bassoon player placed a balloon on the end of his instrument.

At the end of the night, the four Beatles and some of their guests overdubbed an extended humming sound to close the song – an idea that they later discarded. According to Beatles historian Mark Lewisohn, the tapes from this 10 February orchestral session recorded the guests breaking into loud applause following the second orchestral passage. Among the EMI staff attending the event, one recalled how Ron Richards, the Hollies' producer, was stunned by the music he had heard; in Lewisohn's description, Richards "[sat] with his head in his hands, saying 'I just can't believe it ... I give up.'" Martin later offered his own opinion of the orchestral session: "part of me said 'We're being a bit self-indulgent here.' The other part of me said 'It's bloody marvellous!'"

=== Final chord and completion ===
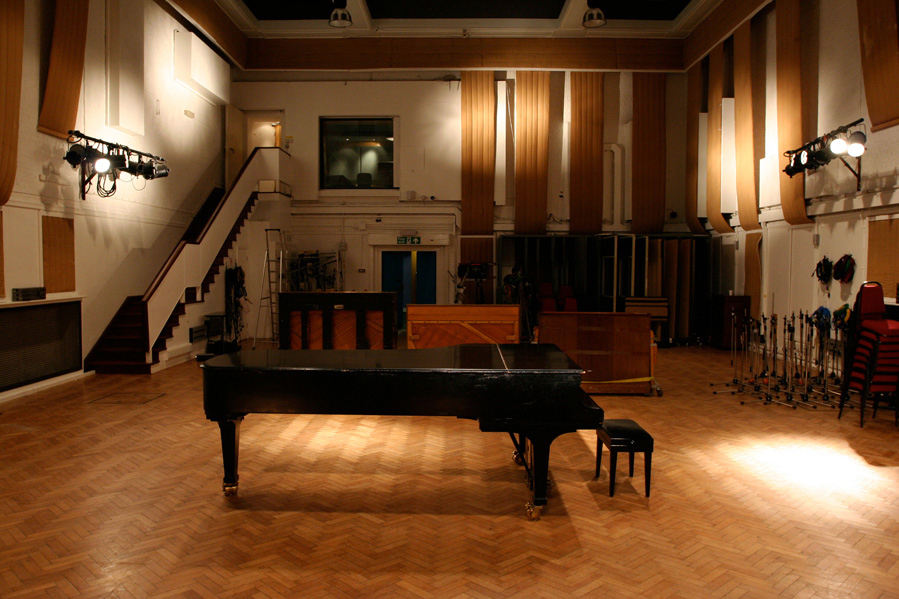
A grand piano in EMI's Studio Two, where the closing piano chord was recorded on 22 February 1967

Following the final orchestral crescendo, the song ends with one of the most famous final chords in music history. Overdubbed in place of the vocal experiment from 10 February, this chord was added during a session at EMI's Studio Two on 22 February. Lennon, McCartney, Starr and Evans shared three different pianos, with Martin on a harmonium, and all played an E-major chord simultaneously. The chord was made to ring out for over forty seconds by increasing the recording sound level as the vibration faded out. Towards the end of the chord the recording level was so high that listeners can hear the sounds of the studio, including rustling papers and a squeaking chair. In author Jonathan Gould's commentary on "A Day in the Life", he describes the final chord as "a forty-second meditation on finality that leaves each member of the audience listening with a new kind of attention and awareness to the sound of nothing at all".

One of the first outsiders to hear the completed recording was the Byrds' David Crosby when he visited the Beatles during their 24 February overdubbing session for "Lovely Rita". He recalled his reaction to the song: "Man, I was a dish-rag. I was floored. It took me several minutes to be able to talk after that." Due to the many takes required to perfect the orchestral cacophony and the final chord, the total time spent recording "A Day in the Life" was 34 hours. By contrast, the Beatles' debut album, Please Please Me, had been recorded in its entirety in only 15 hours, 45 minutes.

=== High-pitched tone and run-out groove ===
Following "A Day in the Life" on the Sgt. Pepper album (as first released on LP in the UK and years later worldwide on CD) is a high-frequency 15-kilohertz tone and some randomly spliced studio chatter. The tone is the same pitch as a dog whistle, at the upper limit of human hearing, but within the range that dogs and cats can hear. This addition was part of the Beatles' humour and was suggested by Lennon. (Note: McCartney would recall how the Beatles thought: "Imagine there are people sitting around and they think the album's finished and then suddenly the dog starts barking and no one will know what the heck's happened.") The studio babble, titled in the session notes "Edit for LP End" and recorded on 21 April 1967, two months after the mono and stereo masters for "A Day in the Life" had been finalised, was added to the run-out groove of the initial British pressing. The two or three seconds of gibberish looped back into itself endlessly on any record player not equipped with an automatic phonograph arm return. Some listeners discerned words among the vocal gibberish, including Lennon saying "Been so high", followed by McCartney's response: "Never could be any other way." or "That’s all for now. Thanks for listening. Please come back to our next LP." US copies of the album lacked the high-pitched tone and the studio babble.

== Variations ==
On the Sgt. Pepper album, the start of "A Day in the Life" is cross-faded with the applause at the end of the previous track, "Sgt. Pepper's Lonely Hearts Club Band (Reprise)". On the Beatles' 1967–1970 compilation LP, the crossfade is cut off, and the track begins abruptly after the start of the original recording, but on the soundtrack album Imagine: John Lennon and the CD versions of 1967–1970, the song starts cleanly, with no applause effects.

The Anthology 2 album, released in 1996, featured a composite remix of "A Day in the Life", including elements from the first two takes, representing the song at its early, pre-orchestral stage, while Anthology 3, the third in a quartet of albums with Anthology 1, Anthology 2 and Anthology 4, all of which tie in with the televised special The Beatles Anthology, included a version of "The End", the last track of the album that signifies the end of The Beatles Anthology by having the last note fade into the final chord of "A Day in the Life" (reversed, then played forwards). The version on the 2006 soundtrack remix album Love has the song starting with Lennon's intro of "sugar plum fairy", with the strings being more prominent during the crescendos. In 2017, a handful of outtakes from the recording sessions, including the first take, were included on the two-disc and six-disc versions of the 50th-anniversary edition of Sgt. Pepper. The six-disc version of that edition also included, on a disc of mono mixes, a previously unreleased early mix of the song in its pre-orchestral stage, as of 30 January.

== BBC radio ban ==
The song became controversial for its supposed references to drugs. On 20 May 1967, during the BBC Light Programme's preview of the Sgt. Pepper album, disc jockey Kenny Everett was prevented from playing "A Day in the Life". The BBC announced that it would not broadcast the song due to the line "I'd love to turn you on", which, according to the corporation, advocated drug use. Other lyrics allegedly referring to drugs include "found my way upstairs and had a smoke / somebody spoke and I went into a dream". A spokesman for the BBC stated: "We have listened to this song over and over again. And we have decided that it appears to go just a little too far, and could encourage a permissive attitude to drug-taking." (Note: According to Tony Bramwell, the BBC ban also led to the film from the orchestral session never being completed. The party aspect of that session was soon reprised by the Beatles when they filmed their performance of "All You Need Is Love" for the Our World satellite broadcast.)

At the time, Lennon and McCartney denied that there were drug references in "A Day in the Life" and publicly complained about the ban at a dinner party at the home of their manager, Brian Epstein, celebrating their album's release. Lennon said that the song was simply about "a crash and its victim", and called the line in question "the most innocent of phrases". McCartney later said: "This was the only one in the album written as a deliberate provocation. A stick-that-in-your-pipe ... But what we want is to turn you on to the truth rather than pot." The Beatles nevertheless aligned themselves with the drug culture in Britain by paying for (at McCartney's instigation) a full-page advertisement in The Times, in which, along with 60 other signatories, they and Epstein denounced the law against marijuana as "immoral in principle and unworkable in practice". In addition, on 19 June, McCartney confirmed to an ITN reporter, further to his statement in a recent Life magazine interview, that he had taken LSD. Described by MacDonald as a "careless admission", it led to condemnation of McCartney in the British press, recalling the outcry caused by the publication of Lennon's "More popular than Jesus" remark in the US in 1966. The BBC ban on the song was eventually lifted on 13 March 1972. (Note: When EMI issued Sgt. Pepper's Lonely Hearts Club Band in Southeast Asia, "A Day in the Life" "With a Little Help from My Friends" and "Lucy in the Sky with Diamonds" were excluded because of supposed drug references.)

== Recognition and reception ==
Recalling the release of Sgt. Pepper in his 1977 book The Beatles Forever, Nicholas Schaffner wrote that "Nothing quite like 'A Day in the Life' had been attempted before in so-called popular music" in terms of the song's "use of dynamics and tricks of rhythm, and of space and stereo effect, and its deft intermingling of scenes from dream, reality, and shades in between". Schaffner said that in the context of 1967, the track "was so visually evocative it seemed more like a film than a mere song. Except that the pictures were all in our heads." Having been given a tape of "A Day in the Life" by Harrison before leaving London, David Crosby proselytised strongly about Sgt. Pepper to his circle in Los Angeles, sharing the recording with his Byrds bandmates and Graham Nash. Crosby later expressed surprise that by 1970 the album's powerful sentiments had not been enough to stop the Vietnam War.

Richard Goldstein of The New York Times called the song "a deadly earnest excursion in emotive music with a chilling lyric" and said that it "stands as one of the most important Lennon–McCartney compositions ... [and] an historic Pop event". In his praise for the track, he drew comparisons between its lyrics and the work of T. S. Eliot and likened its music to Wagner. In a contemporary music critics' poll published by Jazz & Pop magazine, "A Day in the Life" won in the categories of Best Pop Song and Best Pop Arrangement.

In his appraisal of the song, musicologist Walter Everett states that, as on the band's Revolver album, "the most monumental piece on Sgt. Pepper's Lonely Hearts Club Band was Lennon's". He identifies the track's most striking feature as "its mysterious and poetic approach to serious topics that come together in a larger, direct message to its listeners, an embodiment of the central ideal for which the Beatles stood: that a truly meaningful life can be had only when one is aware of one's self and one's surroundings and overcomes the status quo." Beatles biographer Philip Norman describes "A Day in the Life" as a "masterpiece" and cites it as an example of how Sgt. Pepper "certainly was John's Freak Out!", referring to the 1966 album by the Mothers of Invention. As the closing track on Sgt. Pepper, the song was the object of intense scrutiny and commentary. In Ian MacDonald's description, it has been interpreted "as a sober return to the real world after the drunken fantasy of 'Pepperland'; as a conceptual statement about the structure of the pop album (or the artifice of the studio, or the falsity of recorded performance); as an evocation of a bad [LSD] trip; as a 'pop Waste Land'; even as a morbid celebration of death". (Note: According to MacDonald, such interpretations are "nonsense", since they fail to take into account that, contrary to its sequencing at the end of side two, the song was recorded before most of the rest of the album.)

"A Day in the Life" became one of the Beatles' most influential songs, and many now consider it to be the band's greatest work. Paul Grushkin, in his book Rockin' Down the Highway: The Cars and People That Made Rock Roll, called the track "one of the most ambitious, influential, and groundbreaking works in pop music history". According to musicologist John Covach, "'A Day in the Life' is perhaps one of the most important single tracks in the history of rock music; clocking in at only four minutes and forty-five seconds, it must surely be among the shortest epic pieces in rock." In his review of the 50th anniversary edition of Sgt. Pepper for Rolling Stone, Mikal Gilmore says that "A Day in the Life" and Harrison's "Within You Without You" are the only songs on the album that transcend its legacy as "a gestalt: a whole that was greater than the sum of its parts". In a 2017 article for Newsweek, Tim de Lisle cited Chris Smith's recollection of him and fellow art student Freddie Mercury "writ[ing] little bits of songs which we linked together, like 'A Day in the Life'", as evidence to show that "No Pepper, no 'Bohemian Rhapsody'."

James A. Moorer has said that both "A Day in the Life" and a fugue in B minor by Bach were his sources of inspiration for Deep Note, the audio trademark he created for the THX film company. The song's final chord inspired Apple sound designer Jim Reekes in creating the start-up chime of the Apple Macintosh featured on Macintosh Quadra computers. Reekes said he used "a C Major chord, played with both hands stretched out as wide as possible", played on a Korg Wavestation EX.

"A Day in the Life" appears on many top songs lists. It placed twelfth on CBC's 50 Tracks, the second highest Beatles song on the list after "In My Life". It placed first in Q magazine's list of the 50 greatest British songs of all time, and was at the top of Mojo's 101 Greatest Beatles' Songs, as decided by a panel of musicians and journalists. "A Day in the Life" was also nominated for a Grammy in 1967 for Best Arrangement Accompanying Vocalist or Instrumentalist. In 2004, Rolling Stone ranked it at number 28 on the magazine's list of "The 500 Greatest Songs of All Time", number 28 on a revised list in 2011, number 24 on a revised list on 2021, and in 2010, deemed it to be the Beatles' greatest song. It is listed at number 5 on Pitchfork's list of "The 200 Greatest Songs of the 1960s".

== Certifications ==
Region	Certification	Certified units/sales
New Zealand (RMNZ)	Gold	15,000^{‡}
United Kingdom (BPI)	Silver	200,000^{‡}
^{‡} Sales+streaming figures based on certification alone.

== Legacy ==
On 27 August 1992 Lennon's handwritten lyrics were sold by the estate of Mal Evans in an auction at Sotheby's London for $100,000 (£56,600) to Joseph Reynoso, an American from Chicago. The lyrics were put up for sale again in March 2006 by Bonhams in New York. Sealed bids were opened on 7 March 2006 and offers started at about $2 million. The lyric sheet was auctioned again by Sotheby's in June 2010. It was purchased by an anonymous American buyer who paid $1,200,000 (£810,000).

McCartney has performed the song in some of his live shows since his 2008 tour. It is played in a medley with "Give Peace a Chance". On 11 March 2022, the song was certified silver by the British Phonographic Industry (BPI) for sales and streams exceeding 200,000 units.

=== Cover versions ===
The song has been recorded by many other artists, notably by Jeff Beck on the 1998 George Martin album In My Life, which was used in the film Across the Universe, and on Beck's 2008 album Performing This Week: Live at Ronnie Scott's Jazz Club, which won Beck the 2010 Grammy Award for Best Rock Instrumental Performance.

English group The Fall recorded a version for the NME compilation Sgt. Pepper Knew My Father.

Jazz guitarist Wes Montgomery released a smooth jazz version of the song, in his recognisable octave style with string accompaniment, on his 1967 album A Day in the Life. The album also included the guitarist's version of the Beatles' "Eleanor Rigby". The recording is one of Montgomery's popular song adaptations, made after his shift from the hardbop and postbop Riverside Records sound to smooth jazz, A&M period records that were targeted at popular audiences. The album reached number 13, Montgomery's highest showing on the Billboard 200 album chart.

The London Symphony Orchestra released an orchestral cover of the song in 1978 on Classic Rock: The Second Movement. It was also covered by the Bee Gees for the 1978 film Sgt. Pepper's Lonely Hearts Club Band and was included on the soundtrack of the same name, produced by Martin. Credited to Barry Gibb, this version was released as a single, backed by "Nowhere Man", which he also recorded for the film.

David Bowie used the lyric "I heard the news today—oh, boy!" in his 1975 song "Young Americans". Lennon appeared twice on Bowie's album Young Americans, providing guitar and backing vocals. Bob Dylan included the same line in his tribute song to Lennon, "Roll on John", on the 2012 album Tempest.

Phish has covered the song more than 75 times since debuting it on 10 June 1995, often as an encore selection. Page McConnell and Trey Anastasio have split vocal duties for the Lennon/McCartney sections respectively.

A live version by Sting can be found on the EP Demolition Man.

In 1969, Os Mutantes played a version on TV Cultura during their appearance in the show Jovem Urgente.

== Personnel ==
The Beatles

- John Lennon – lead vocal (verses), acoustic guitar, piano (final chord)
- Paul McCartney – lead vocal (middle-eight), piano (throughout and final chord), bass guitar
- George Harrison – maracas
- Ringo Starr – drums, congas, piano (final chord)

Additional musicians

- Mal Evans – alarm clock, counting, piano (final chord)
- George Martin – orchestral arrangement, harmonium (final chord)
- Erich Gruenberg, Granville Jones, Bill Monro, Jurgen Hess, Hans Geiger, D. Bradley, Lionel Bentley, David McCallum, Donald Weekes, Henry Datyner, Sidney Sax, Ernest Scott, Carlos Villa – violin
- John Underwood, Gwynne Edwards, Bernard Davis, John Meek – viola
- Francisco Gabarro, Dennis Vigay, Alan Delziel, Alex Nifosi – cello
- Cyril Mac Arther, Gordon Pearce – double bass
- John Marson – harp
- Roger Lord – oboe
- Basil Tschaikov, Jack Brymer – clarinet
- N. Fawcett, Alfred Waters – bassoon
- Clifford Seville, David Sandeman – flute
- Alan Civil, Neil Sanders – French horn
- David Mason, Monty Montgomery, Harold Jackson – trumpet
- Raymond Brown, Raymond Premru, T. Moore – trombone
- Michael Barnes – tuba
- Tristan Fry – timpani
- Marijke Koger – tambourine

== Sources ==
- The Beatles (2000). The Beatles Anthology. San Francisco, California: Chronicle Books. ISBN 0-8118-2684-8.
- Doggett, Peter (2015). Electric Shock: From the Gramophone to the iPhone – 125 Years of Pop Music. London: The Bodley Head. ISBN 978-1-84792-218-2.
- Emerick, Geoff (2006). Here, There and Everywhere: My Life Recording the Music of The Beatles. Gotham Books. ISBN 978-1-59240-269-4.
- Everett, Walter (1999). The Beatles as Musicians: Revolver Through the Anthology. New York: Oxford University Press. ISBN 978-0-19-512941-0. Archived from the original on 4 February 2021.
- Gould, Jonathan (2007). Can't Buy Me Love: The Beatles, Britain and America. London: Piatkus. ISBN 978-0-7499-2988-6. Archived from the original on 20 October 2021.
- Harris, John (March 2007). "The Day the World Turned Day-glo!". Mojo. pp. 72–89.
- Hertsgaard, Mark (1996). A Day in the Life: The Music and Artistry of the Beatles. London: Pan Books. ISBN 0-330-33891-9.
- Howlett, Kevin (2017). Sgt. Pepper's Lonely Hearts Club Band Super Deluxe Edition (CD booklet). The Beatles. Apple Records.
- Lavezzoli, Peter (2006). The Dawn of Indian Music in the West. New York: Continuum. ISBN 0-8264-2819-3.
- Lewisohn, Mark (2005) [1988]. The Complete Beatles Recording Sessions: The Official Story of the Abbey Road Years 1962–1970. London: Bounty Books. ISBN 978-0-7537-2545-0.
- MacDonald, Ian (2005). Revolution in the Head: The Beatles' Records and the Sixties (3rd ed.). Chicago Review Press. ISBN 978-1-55652-733-3. Archived from the original on 22 February 2017.
- Miles, Barry (1997). Paul McCartney: Many Years From Now. New York: Henry Holt & Company. ISBN 0-8050-5249-6.
- Miles, Barry (2001). The Beatles Diary Volume 1: The Beatles Years. London: Omnibus Press. ISBN 0-7119-8308-9.
- Norman, Philip (2016). Paul McCartney: The Biography. New York: Little, Brown and Company. ISBN 978-0-316-32796-1.
- Riley, Tim (2011). Lennon: The Man, the Myth, the Music – The Definitive Life. London: Random House. ISBN 978-0-7535-4020-6.
- Schaffner, Nicholas (1978). The Beatles Forever. New York: McGraw-Hill. ISBN 0-07-055087-5.
- Sounes, Howard (2010). Fab: An Intimate Life of Paul McCartney. London: HarperCollins. ISBN 978-0-00-723705-0.
- Winn, John C. (2009). That Magic Feeling: The Beatles' Recorded Legacy, Volume Two, 1966–1970. New York: Three Rivers Press. ISBN 978-0-307-45239-9.
- Womack, Kenneth (2014). The Beatles Encyclopedia: Everything Fab Four. Santa Barbara, California: ABC-CLIO. ISBN 978-0-313-39171-2.
- Rombeck, Hans; Neumann, Wolfgang (1977). Die Beatles: Ihre Karriere, ihre Musik, ihre Erfolge (in German). Bastei-Lübbe. ISBN 978-3-404-00588-8.
