= Nova Kinosenter =

Cinema in Trondheim, Norway

Coordinates: 63.43317°N 10.40194°E

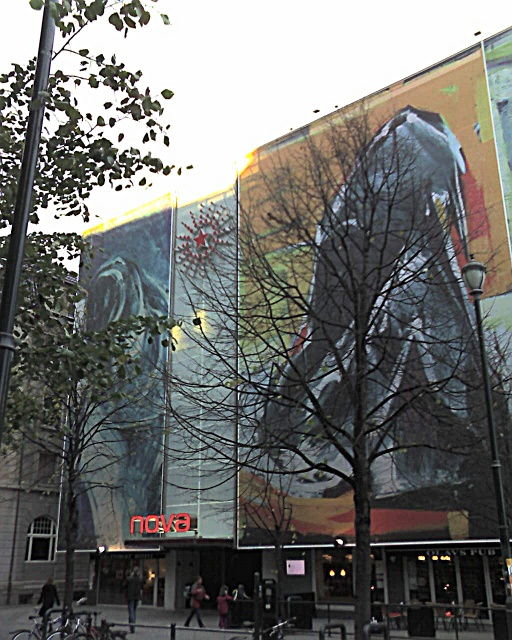
Nova's main entrance in October 2005

Nova Kinosenter is a cinema located in the city of Trondheim in Norway. It is one of Norway's most modern cinemas, and in September 2004, six new auditoria were added to the existing five. In its current form, Nova can accommodate 1314 people.

== Auditoria ==
Auditorium	Seats	Sound system	Visuals	3D
1*	439	Dolby A, Dolby SR, Dolby Digital, DTS, EX, deep bass, THX approved	4K HFR	Yes
2	113	Dolby A, Dolby SR, deep bass	2K 24fps	Yes
3	115	Dolby A, Dolby SR, deep bass	2K 24fps	No
4	92	Dolby A	2K 48fps	Yes
5	90	Dolby A	2K 48fps	Yes
6	61	Dolby A, Dolby SR, Dolby Digital, EX, deep bass	2K 48fps	Yes
7	98	Dolby A, Dolby SR, Dolby Digital, EX, deep bass	2K 48fps	Yes
8	61	Dolby A, Dolby SR, Dolby Digital, EX, deep bass	2K 48fps	Yes
9	104	Dolby A, Dolby SR, Dolby Digital, EX, deep bass	2K 48fps	Yes
10	69	Dolby A, Dolby SR, Dolby Digital, EX, deep bass	2K 48fps	Yes
11	63	Dolby A, Dolby SR, Dolby Digital, EX, deep bass	2K 48fps	Yes

* Auditorium number one is called Ullman-salen (the Ullmann auditorium), named after the famous Norwegian actor Liv Johanne Ullmann.

== Other sources ==
- Haugan, Trond E. Byens magiske rom: Historien om Trondheim kino (Tapir Akademisk Forlag, 2008, ISBN 978-82-519-2242-5) (in Norwegian)
