= Audio Signal Processor =

Technological basis for the SoundDroid

The Audio Signal Processor (ASP) is a large-scale digital signal processor developed by James A. Moorer at Lucasfilm's The Droid Works. Moorer programmed a number of digital signal processing algorithms that were used in major motion picture features. Sounds processed by the ASP were used in the THX logo's Deep Note, Return of the Jedi, Indiana Jones and the Temple of Doom, and others. ASP provided the technological basis for the SoundDroid.
