= SoundDroid =

Early digital audio workstation

- Industry: Sound effects Sound editing
- Founded: 1980; 46 years ago

The SoundDroid is an early digital audio workstation designed and developed between 1980 and 1987 by a team of engineers led by James A. Moorer at Lucasfilm. It was a hard-disk–based, nonlinear audio editor developed on the Audio Signal Processor (ASP), a large-scale digital signal processor for real-time, multichannel equalization and audio mixing. The ASP was connected to a Sun-1 workstation, and with a physical console, could replace multi-slider mixers and provide new tools for audio spotting, editing, and mixing.

== History ==
George Lucas hired Ed Catmull as The Empire Strikes Back began production, charging him with building a computer division to solve a number of problems that were painful and expensive during the original Star Wars production.

Catmull built an in-house project to produce 3 specific digital tools for filmmaking--an image compositor, a nonlinear picture editor, and a digital audio workstation. Experts were drafted to lead each project, and Catmull hired James A. Moorer, at the time one of the leading figures in the new realm of digital audio.

The audio project that became SoundDroid was done in close collaboration with the Lucasfilm post-production division, Sprocket Systems, and in 1985 spun out along with the editing project as part of a joint venture called The Droid Works to market new tools for post production. The graphics project--what became Pixar was more complicated and sold off separately, to Steve Jobs in this same period.

In the early 1980s the audio signal processor (ASP) was tested to solve a number of post production problems. Noteworthy was the development of noise subtraction where a "fingerprint" of recorded noise could be subtracted from an audio wave, resulting in an otherwise-impossible cleaning. This was used on the Milos Foreman film Amadeaus being post produced in Berkeley, and for which one scene would have been unusable if not for the technology. For Lucasfilm, the ASP was utilized to add Doppler shift to recordings-- to arrows being shot at Indiana Jones in "Temple of Doom."

Moorer developed an acoustic logo for the SoundDroid, a sound that would run through all the frequencies and spin through a range of speakers and would be dramatic. The SoundDroid development was closely aligned with the TAP/THX program at Lucasfilm to improve movie theater sound and experience. The sound Moorer invented for THX he called "Deep Note." It was the sound played by the SoundDroid when it was booted up.

Deposits for SoundDroids were taken from celebrities such as Stevie Wonder and Michael Jackson, but only one SoundDroid prototype was ever built, and the product was never commercialized.

EditDroid and SoundDroid were the beginnings of the desktop tools digital revolution.

The executive team at The Droid Works left Lucasfilm in 1986 to start Sonic Solutions, and along with James Moorer developed the NoNoise product to denoise the corpus of analog audio recordings that were about to be transferred to the new CD digital format.

== Capabilities ==
Complete with a trackball, touch-sensitive displays, moving faders, and a jog-shuttle wheel, the SoundDroid included programs for sound synthesis, digital reverberation, recording, editing and mixing.

== Sources ==
- Kunkes, Michael (January 1, 2006), Digital Dreamcatcher: Droidmaker Chronicles the Early Years of Lucasfilm, The Motion Picture Editor Guild, archived from the original on June 13, 2016.
- Leider, Colby (2004). Digital Audio Workstation: Mixing, Recording, and Mastering on Your Mac Or PC. McGraw-Hill. p. 398. ISBN 0-07-142286-2.
- Rubin, Michael (2005). Droidmaker: George Lucas and the Digital Revolution. Triad. p. 518. ISBN 0-937404-67-5.
- Tracy, Eleanor Johnson (1985), "Droids for Sale: Star Wars' George Lucas is pushing new technology", Fortune, CNN, archived from the original on April 17, 2008.
