= Burns' Heir =

- The Simpsons episode
- Episode no.: Season 5 Episode 18
- Directed by: Mark Kirkland
- Written by: Jace Richdale
- Production code: 1F16
- Original air date: April 14, 1994

Guest appearance
- Phil Hartman as Lionel Hutz

Episode features
- Chalkboard gag: "The Pledge of Allegiance does not end with "Hail Satan""
- Couch gag: The Simpsons are balls that bounce onto the couch. Bart almost bounces away, but Homer reins him in and hurls him in place.
- Commentary: Matt Groening; David Mirkin; Jace Richdale; Mark Kirkland; David Silverman

Episode chronology
← Previous "Bart Gets an Elephant"	Next → "Sweet Seymour Skinner's Baadasssss Song"
- The Simpsons season 5

"Burns' Heir" is the eighteenth episode of the fifth season of the American animated television series The Simpsons. It originally aired on the Fox network in the United States on April 14, 1994. In the episode, Mr. Burns has a near-death experience that prompts him to find an heir to inherit his wealth after he dies. He chooses Bart as his heir because he admires the "creature of pure malevolence". Marge convinces Bart to spend time with his benefactor, who allows his heir the money and freedom to do whatever he pleases, and Bart soon leaves his family to live with Burns instead.

The episode was written by Jace Richdale (his sole writing credit for the series) and directed by Mark Kirkland. David Silverman was originally set to direct the episode, but he was so swamped with his work as supervising director that it was reassigned to Kirkland.

== Plot ==
Mr. Burns almost drowns while taking a bath after Smithers puts a sponge on his head, weighing down his frail body. Realizing that he has no one to carry on his legacy when he dies (Smithers is to be buried alive with him), Mr. Burns decides to find an heir to inherit his vast fortune. Burns auditions several boys for his heir. He rejects Bart because he dislikes the poorly worded proposal Homer makes him read aloud at the auditions. Feeling spiteful, Bart vandalizes Burns's mansion. Burns is impressed by Bart, whom he refers to as a "creature of pure malevolence" and accepts him as his heir.

Homer and Marge sign a legal document that officially names Bart as Burns' heir. Marge suggests that Bart spend time with the lonely old man as he stands to inherit his fortune. Initially repelled by Burns' coldness, Bart warms to him after Burns promises to give Bart anything he wants. Bart soon abandons his family because Burns adopts a laissez faire attitude towards him. Bart's parents sue to get their son back, but the court rules in favor of Burns due to the incompetence of the Simpson family's lawyer, Lionel Hutz. The Simpsons hire a deprogrammer to kidnap Bart, but the deprogrammer abducts Hans Moleman by mistake and brainwashes him into thinking he is Homer and Marge's son.

When Bart grows lonely and wants to go home, Burns, who has grown fond of Bart, tricks him into thinking his family no longer loves him by staging a video with actors portraying Homer, Marge, and Lisa. Bart decides that Burns is his "true father" and they celebrate by firing several Springfield Nuclear Power Plant employees. When Homer enters the office, Burns tries to completely sever Bart's family ties by forcing him to fire his father. Instead, Bart "fires" Burns by dropping him through a trapdoor. Bart moves back home and is embraced by his family, and learns that Homer has adopted Hans Moleman.

== Production ==
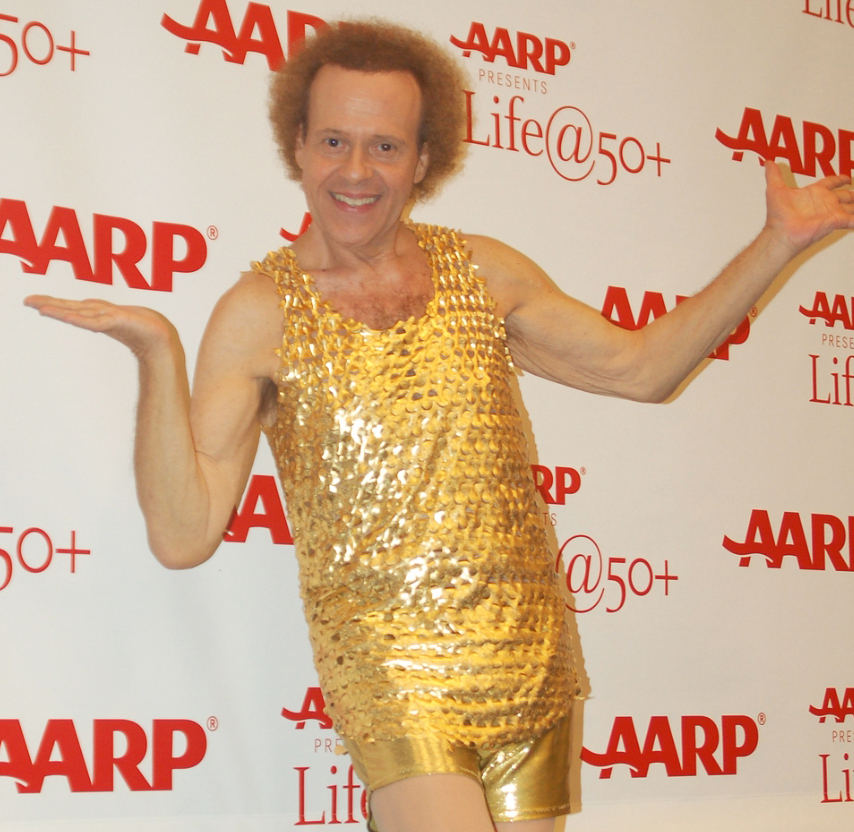
Richard Simmons did not voice his own robotic counterpart, despite the writers' wishes.

"Burns' Heir" was the only episode for which Jace Richdale received a writers' credit, although he was a part of The Simpsons's staff for several seasons. When he was starting out as a writer on the show, Richdale was told to pitch some story ideas and he came up with the basic plot off the top of his head. David Silverman was originally going to direct the episode, but he was so swamped with his work as supervising director that it was reassigned to Mark Kirkland. While the Simpsons are at a movie, there is a parody of the THX sound Deep Note. The THX executives liked the parody so much that the scene was made into an actual THX movie trailer, with the scene being redone for the widescreen aspect ratio.

A deleted scene from the episode sees Mr. Burns release a "Robotic Richard Simmons" as a way of getting rid of Homer, which dances to a recording of K.C. and the Sunshine Band's "Shake Your Booty". Simmons was originally asked to guest star; according to David Mirkin, he was "dying to do the show", but declined when he found out he would voice a robot. It was fully animated, but was cut because it often did not get a good reaction during table reads. According to Bill Oakley, there was a "significant division of opinion amongst the staff as to whether Richard Simmons was a target The Simpsons should make fun of" because it was "well-trod territory". They also felt it distracted viewers from the story. To the production staff's surprise, the scene would make the audience "erupt with laughter" when screened at animation conventions and college presentations, so they decided to insert it in the season seven clip show "The Simpsons 138th Episode Spectacular".

== Reception ==
In its original broadcast, "Burns' Heir" finished 53rd in ratings for the week of April 11–17, 1994, with a Nielsen rating of 9.4, and was viewed in 8.85 million households. The show dropped four places in the rankings after finishing 49th the previous week. It was the third highest rated show on Fox that week following Living Single and Married... with Children.

The authors of the book I Can't Believe It's a Bigger and Better Updated Unofficial Simpsons Guide, Gary Russell and Gareth Roberts, wrote that, "the episode lacks the emotional punch of others in which members of the family are separated."

DVD Movie Guide's Colin Jacobson wrote that the episode was "such a great concept that it’s a surprise no [one] went for it earlier." He felt that it "occasionally veers on the edge of mushiness, but it avoids becoming too sentimental. It's a blast to see Burns’ world from Bart’s point of view. DVD Talk gave the episode a score of 5 out of 5 while DVD Verdict gave the episode a B.

Paul Campos of Rocky Mountain News described the Robotic Richard Simmons scene as "a level of surreal comedy that approaches a kind of genius".

=== Legacy ===
Homer's quote, "Kids, you tried your best and you failed miserably. The lesson is never try", was added to The Oxford Dictionary of Quotations in August 2007.
