= InterActual Player =

Media player for Microsoft Windows

- Developer: InterActual Technologies (subsidiary of Sonic Solutions)
- Final release: 2.7 / October 2007; 18 years ago
- Operating system: Microsoft Windows, Mac OS X
- Type: Media player
- License: Proprietary (freeware)
- Website: Player interactual

InterActual Player, known originally as PC Friendly, was a media player for Microsoft Windows and Mac OS X, included on some DVDs with movie files. In addition to providing DVD playback control it makes available extra material on some DVDs, including commentaries, pop-up notes, synchronized screenplays and games. It requires existing DVD player software, which it embeds in the interface for playing the actual DVDs.

== Details ==
InterActual Player software automatically displays an installation dialog when a user inserts a DVD containing it into the DVD-ROM Drive. If the user chooses to install InterActual Player it becomes the default DVD player and creates a shortcut on the desktop and a link to the InterActual website. It also asks the user to supply information voluntarily and allow usage data to be sent over the Internet. InterActual Player can also be accessed by the internet.

As of January 2017, the service has been permanently shut down.
