= CD publishing =

CD publishing is the use of CD duplication systems to create a large number of unique discs. For instance, storing a unique serial number on each copy of a software application disc would be considered CD publishing.

The term CD publishing is believed to have been coined by the Rimage Corporation as part of a marketing program which referred to CD-R discs as "digital paper." Automated disc production and printing systems, such as those made by Rimage, can be shared on a computer network much like an office printer to facilitate the creation of unique discs. This is the root of both the digital paper and CD publishing terms.

The extension into CD publishing is a distinct advantage of CD duplication systems over traditional CD replication - where large quantities of identical discs must be made.
