= Disc Description Protocol =

Format for specifying the content of optical discs

Disc Description Protocol (DDP) is a format for specifying the content of optical discs, including CDs and DVDs.

DDP is commonly used for delivery of disc premasters for duplication. DDP is a proprietary format and is the property of DCA. The file format specification is not freely available.

The DDP must contain 4 parts:

1. Audio image(s) (.DAT file(s))
2. DDP Identifier (DDPID)
3. DDP Stream descriptor (DDPMS)
4. Subcode descriptor (PQDESCR)

An optional text file, containing the track titles and timings, can also be included.

== Software ==
Windows PC:

- Adobe Encore
- Cockos REAPER
- DCA Viper
- DDP Mastering Tools (command line)
- Eclipse Image Encoder
- Gear Pro Mastering
- HOFA CD Burn & DDP
- Magix Sequoia
- Merging Pyramix
- PreSonus Studio One Professional
- SADiE
- Sonoris DDP Creator
- Steinberg WaveLab

macOS:

- Triumph Mastering Suite
- Adobe Encore×
- Audiofile Engineering Triumph (previously Wave Editor)
- Audiofile Triumph
- Cockos Reaper
- DDP Mastering Tools (command line)
- DSP-Quattro
- HOFA CD Burn & DDP
- PreSonus Studio One Professional
- Sonic Studio soundBlade and PMCD
- Sonoris DDP Creator for Mac
- Steinberg WaveLab

Linux:

- DDP Mastering Tools (command line)

== See also ==
- PMCD
