= PMCD =

Specially formatted Compact Disc for replication

PMCD (PreMaster CD) is a specially formatted, recordable Compact Disc designed to be sent to a CD pressing plant for replication. The PreMaster CD format, developed in the early 1990s by the CD-ROM division of Sony, in cooperation with "START Lab Inc." of Tokyo and Sonic Solutions, contained a hidden "PreMaster Cue Sheet" that held the metadata needed for replication that a Red Book CD-DA lacks. The PreMaster CD format made use of the fact that not all data-recording surfaces are specified for use in the Red Book CD-DA or Yellow Book CD-ROM standards. CD transports were not able to recover the data hidden in the Cue Sheet unless commanded to by proprietary software. The Cue Sheet specified a broad range of metadata, including number of channels, per track pre-emphasis status, per track copy protection bit setting, per track ISRC Codes, per disc UPC/EAN, etc. (see Compact Disc subcode).

Despite claims to the contrary, only Sonic Solutions' "Sonic System" software was able to generate PreMaster CDs. PMCDs were subsequently obsoleted by the more modern and generalized Disc Description Protocol (DDP) specification. Several factors led to the decline of the PreMaster CD standard. First, the CD-R mechanisms that were able to read and write the hidden cue sheet metadata went out of production in the late 1990s. Second, only Laser Beam Recorders or LBRs manufactured by Sony were able to read PMCDs, which limited the formats adoption by replicators.

Many CD replicators now accept regular CD-R discs in place of true PMCDs, which can be created using specialized Audio CD pre-mastering software. However, CD-Rs formatted as "Audio CDs", which really are Red Book-formatted Orange Book discs, are not designed for disc replication, only content distribution. The CIRC error correction used for the audio data on these discs is not as extensive as what is used for CD-ROM or DVD formats, so corruption of the audio data during readout due to dirt or mechanical damage could result in total loss of the audio data. Modern, professional pre-mastering software relies on the DDP format, which protects both the audio data and its associated metadata.
