= Editor (disambiguation) =

An editor is a person who edits (i.e. makes changes to) documents or audiovisual works.

(The) editor(s) may also refer to:

== People ==
- Authors' editor, works with authors (rather than publishers) to make draft texts fit for purpose
- Contributing editor, a magazine or book-publishing title, sometimes honorary, with a variety of meanings
- Copy editor, making formatting changes and other improvements to text (sometimes called "manuscript editor" in academic publishing)
- Developmental editor, an editor who supports authors before and during the drafting of a manuscript
- Editor-in-chief, having final responsibility for a publication's operations and policies
- Film editor, person who selects and edits the raw footage of a film to create a finished motion picture
- Literary editor, in a newspaper or similar, deals with reviews or literary criticism
- Managing editor, senior member of a publication's management team
- Music editor (filmmaking), type of sound editor responsible for music
- Picture editor, or photo editor, collects and reviews photographs and/or illustrations for publication
- Script editor, works with the screenwriter and producer of television dramas and comedies
- Sound editor (filmmaking), prepares the sound on a film or television production

== Computer tools ==
- Digital audio editor, for editing audio data
- Graphics editor, for creating and manipulating visual images
  - Raster graphics editor, for editing pictures in bitmap or raster format
  - Vector graphics editor, for editing pictures in vector format
- Hex editor, for editing binary data
- HTML editor, for editing web pages
- Level editor, for editing levels of computer games
- MS-DOS Editor, a plain-text editor for MS-DOS and Microsoft Windows
- Source code editor, for editing source code
- Text editor, for editing plain text
- Visual editor, an editing program that displays text on screen as it is edited
- Word processor, for producing and editing any sort of printable material
- WYSIWYG editor, for editing and visualizing formatted text or graphics
- XML editor, for editing XML data

== Other uses ==
- The Editor, a 2014 Canadian black comedy giallo film
- The Editor (Doctor Who), a fictional character
- Editors (band), an English rock band
- The Editors (novel), a 2024 novel by Stephen Harrison
- SS Editor, an American cargo ship in service 1919–41

== See also ==
- EDITED (company), a retail technology company based in London, England
