= James A. Moorer =

Computer scientist, audio engineer and inventor of the THX Deep Note (born 1945)

James Anderson Moorer (born November 25, 1945) is an American digital audio and computer music engineer, responsible for over 40 technical publications and four patents.

He personally designed and wrote many of the advanced DSP algorithms for the Sonic Solutions "NoNOISE" process which is used to restore vintage recordings for CD remastering.

In the mid-1970s he was co-director and co-founder of the Stanford Center for Computer Research in Music and Acoustics. He received his PhD in computer science from Stanford University in 1975.

Between 1977 and 1979, he was a researcher and the scientific advisor to IRCAM in Paris.

Between 1980 and 1987, while vice-president of research and development at Lucasfilm's The Droid Works, he designed the Audio Signal Processor (ASP) which was used in the production of sound tracks for Return of the Jedi, Indiana Jones and the Temple of Doom, and others, including the well-known company THX, and its Deep Note audio logo.

In 1991, he won the Audio Engineering Society Silver award for lifetime achievement. In 1996, he won an Emmy Award for Technical Achievement with his partners, Robert J. Doris and Mary C. Sauer for Sonic Solutions "NoNOISE" for Noise Reduction on Television Broadcast Sound Tracks. In 1999, he won an Academy of Motion Picture Arts and Sciences Scientific and Engineering Award for his pioneering work in the design of digital signal processing and its application to audio editing for film. He previously worked at Adobe Systems as a senior computer scientist in the DVD team.

== See also ==
- SoundDroid
