= Deep Note =

THX's sound logo, a distinctive synthesized crescendo sound

The THX Deep Note

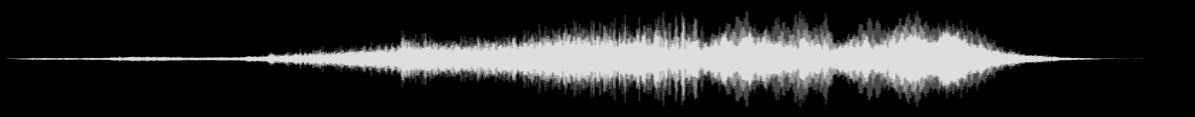
Waveform of the Deep Note

The Deep Note is the sound trademark of THX, being a distinctive synthesized crescendo that glissandos from a relatively narrow frequency spread (about 200–400 Hz) to a broader frequency spread (of about three octaves). It was created by James A. Moorer, a former employee of Lucasfilm's Computer Division (later known as Pixar Animation Studios) in late 1982. The sound is used on trailers for THX-certified movie theaters, home video releases, video games, and in-car entertainment systems.

The Deep Note was partially previewed on the opening track of the 1983 album The Digital Domain: A Demonstration, where it was included among sound effects that were combined with the Deep Note itself. The Deep Note debuted later that same year at the premiere of Return of the Jedi in L.A.

== Description ==
The U.S. trademark registration for the first version of the sound contains this description of it:

The THX logo theme consists of 30 voices over seven measures, starting in a narrow range, 200 to 400 Hz, and slowly diverging to preselected pitches encompassing three octaves. The 30 voices begin at pitches between 200 Hz and 400 Hz and arrive at pre-selected pitches spanning three octaves by the fourth measure. The highest pitch is slightly detuned while there is double the number of voices of the lowest two pitches.

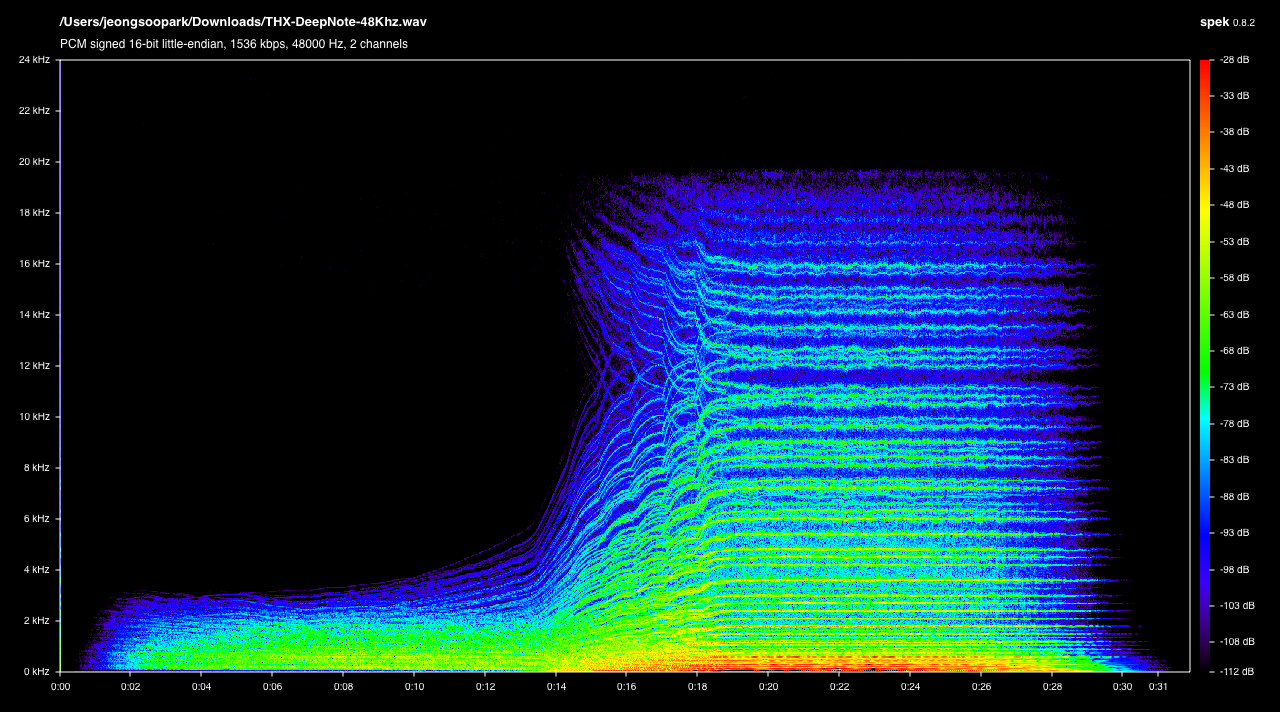
Spectrogram made using Spek

In 1992, the Deep Note was registered as a trademark by the United States Patent and Trademark Office.

The sound is perceived as louder than it actually is; sound designer and re-recording mixer Gary Rydstrom explains that, "from a technical standpoint, 'Deep Note' just feels loud because it has a spectrum of frequencies that grows from small to large."

Although Moorer had initially claimed that the score consisted of about 20,000 lines of code, he subsequently corrected the statement and elaborated:

The original 30-year-old C program is 355 lines, and the "patch" file for the synthesizer was 300 more lines. I guess it just felt like 20,000 lines when I did it. Given that it was written and debugged in 4 days, I can't claim the programming chops to make 20,000 lines of working code that quickly. But, to synthesize it in real-time, in 1983, took 2 years to design and build a 19-inch rack full of digital hardware and 200,000 lines of system code to run the synthesizer. All that was already done, so I was building on a large foundation of audio processing horsepower, both hardware and software. Consequently, a mere 355 lines of C code and 300 lines of audio patching set-up for the 30 voices was enough to invoke the audio horsepower to make the piece.

=== Millennium version (1999) ===
As part of a collaboration of the new Dolby Digital Surround EX sound systems, THX released the Broadway 2000 trailer on May 19, 1999, in front of the theatrical screenings of Star Wars: Episode I – The Phantom Menace. As a result, an entirely new Deep Note was made from scratch. In this version of the Deep Note, new voices were made using a similar process, while voices from the previous version can be briefly heard. Aside from the trailer's appearance in theaters as well as on The Adventures of Indiana Jones DVD box set, the only other trailer that also uses this version of the Deep Note was a trailer made specially for the post-2000 home media releases of Terminator 2: Judgment Day.

=== Remastered version (2005–present) ===
In 2005, to coincide with the theatrical release of Star Wars: Episode III – Revenge of the Sith, THX introduced a new trailer called The Science of Sensation, which featured a new version of the Deep Note, which is similar to the original, but voices from the Broadway 2000 trailer were mixed.

=== Regenerated version (2015–present) ===
In 2015, THX introduced a new trailer called Eclipse, which was accompanied by an updated, "Dolbyized" and more powerful version of the Deep Note, also created by Moorer. This version of the Deep Note was created entirely digitally so it could play on Dolby Surround 7.1, Dolby Atmos, and DTS:X systems, and Moorer created 30-second, 45-second, and 60-second versions of it. Moorer used around eighty voices in the remake, as opposed to thirty in the original 1983 version. He stated in an interview, "That's the way I wanted it to sound originally. I think it's as far as you can take it."

=== Previous works ===
Prior to the creation of the Deep Note, several other works made use of similar techniques of frequency spread. A recognized predecessor is a section in the Beatles' 1967 song "A Day in the Life", using a full orchestra. Unlike in the Deep Note, the resolving high chord is never held, but instead brought to a stop. Moorer has admitted that both "A Day in the Life" and a fugue in B minor by Bach were sources of inspiration for the Deep Note.

In their book Analog Days, Trevor Pinch and Frank Trocco say that the track "Spaced", from the 1970 Beaver & Krause album In a Wild Sanctuary, was "copied by a famous Marin County film company" to introduce its film presentations, although they do not identify the company. The authors quote synthesizer builder Tom Oberheim as saying that the original analog form is much richer than the "digital perfection" evident in the sound logo so familiar to cinema-goers.

Pitchfork notes that a similar sound previously appeared on Yellow Magic Orchestra's 1981 electronic album BGM, where the ambient track "Loom" has "a patiently ascending, two-minute-long Shepard’s tone" that anticipated the Deep Note.

=== Original score ===
Score for 'Deep Note'

In 2018, THX released a picture of the original 30-voice score, with notes.

== Lawsuit ==
Lucasfilm, the ex-owner of THX, sued rapper Dr. Dre in 2000 for using an unauthorized cover of Deep Note in the opening track "Lolo (Intro)" on his 1999 album 2001.

== In popular culture ==
In a 1994 episode of The Simpsons titled "Burns' Heir", there is a parody gag of the Deep Note, with the Simpson family in the theater watching Siskel & Ebert: The Movie. The Deep Note causes multiple things in the theater to explode seemingly from acoustic resonance, and ends with Abraham Simpson screaming "Turn it up!" THX executives liked the parody so much that the scene was later remade into an actual THX movie trailer, with the scene being redone in a widescreen aspect ratio by Film Roman.

"Dumbest Girl Alive", the opening track on the album 10,000 Gecs, by hyperpop duo 100 gecs, begins with a sample of the THX Deep Note.

Jacob Collier recreated the THX Deep Note in "100,000 Voices", the opening track to his 2024 album Djesse Vol. 4. He discussed his inspiration and method of recreating the sound with an audience choir on the March 4, 2024 episode of Switched on Pop.
