= Sonic Solutions =

American software company

- Final headquarters in Novato, California
- Type: Public
- Traded as: Nasdaq: SNIC
- Industry: Software
- Founded: 1987; 39 years ago
- Founder: Robert Doris; Mary Sauer; James A. Moorer
- Successor: Rovi Corporation
- Headquarters: Novato, California, United States
- Key people: Robert Doris (founder, chairman/president & CEO); James A. Moorer (co-founder & CTO)
- Products: See complete products listing
- Revenue: $110.22 million USD (2009)
- Number of employees: Approx 700 (December 2007)
- Website: roxio.com, qflix.com, cinemanow.com, divx.com

Sonic Solutions was an American computer software company headquartered in Novato, California. In addition to having a number of offices in the U.S., the company also maintained offices in Europe and Asia. It was acquired by Rovi Corporation in 2010.

== History ==
Sonic Solutions was created by former Lucasfilm employees Robert Doris, Mary Sauer and scientist Andy Moorer who developed the SoundDroid digital audio editing system as part of the Droid Works project at the Lucasfilm Computer Division. (Another notable spinoff of the division is Pixar.)

Sonic developed and marketed The Sonic System, a professional non-linear digital audio workstation for music editing, restoration and CD preparation.

Sonic received an Emmy Award for technical achievement in 1996. In the same year the company worked with numerous Hollywood studios and consumer electronic manufactures to introduce the first commercial DVD production system. Sonic extended its business to enterprise software areas with its DVD authoring systems for professional use (Sonic Scenarist and Sonic DVD Producer) as well as retail and PC OEM DVD software applications for home use (DVDit, MyDVD, and RecordNow).

In 2002, Sonic spun off their entire audio division as Sonic Studio, LLC, to concentrate solely on the DVD marketplace, enterprise software and licensing of IP and source code. Notable customers included Microsoft, Apple, Google, Adobe and Avid. Its middleware and embedded chip included deals with Texas Instruments, Broadcom, Scientific Atlanta/Cisco, Marvell, and Intel.

Sonic expanded to the consumer software business (photo, audio and video editing) in 2000, shipping roughly 50 million copies per year through direct web sales and over 15,000 retail store fronts including Apple Store, Walmart, Costco, Best Buy, Target, Dixon's and MediaMarkt. It grew to command a 64% market share in its category.

Since the company filed for an initial public offering (IPO) and went public in 1994, the company has generated over $1.5 billion in revenue in the digital media category and has been named one of Forbes, Fortune and BusinessWeek's fastest growing companies on multiple occasions.

In 2005, Sonic began moving its consumer software business to a SAAS model.

By 2010, Sonic was one of the largest providers of premium movies via the web and CE devices, in partnership with major movie studios. Sonic held the rights to the movies and provided cloud delivery as a white label provider.

== Acquisitions ==
Sonic's major acquisitions include the Desktop and Mobile Division (DMD) of VERITAS Software Corporation in 2002, Roxio in 2003 (consumer applications for Windows and Mac OS), and Simple Star (online slideshow creation) and CinemaNow in 2008 (digital movie delivery). In October 2010, the company acquired DivX Inc. in a $326 million stock and cash deal as the digital-media provider moves to enhance online video offerings.

== Sale ==
On December 23, 2010, Rovi Corporation announced its intention to acquire the company. The sale was a cash stock deal for just under $1 billion. According to a February 2011 article in Business Insider, Sonic yielded the highest return of any publicly traded company on the NYSE or NASDAQ markets. Both stocks rose on the deal announcement, creating a 66% premium above market. The acquisition was completed early the next year. In January 2012, Rovi announced that it would be selling the Roxio division and product line to Corel.

== Products ==
=== Consumer ===
- CinemaNow
- CinePlayer
- Creator (originally released as Easy Media Creator, and later renamed Roxio Creator)
- DivX
- Easy VHS to DVD
- MyDVD
- PhotoShow
- Toast

=== Professional ===
- BD PowerStation
- CineVision
- MainConcept Reference
- Scenarist
