= THX =

Theater standard and American audio company founded in 1983 by George Lucas

THX Ltd.
- Type: Subsidiary
- Industry: Motion picture industry
- Founded: May 20, 1983; 43 years ago
- Founder: George Lucas
- Headquarters: San Rafael, California, U.S.
- Key people: Tuyen Pham (CEO); Aaron Endo (CFO); Tomlinson Holman (original developer); George Lucas
- Services: Sound recording and reproduction; Quality assurance; Audio crossover
- Parent: Lucasfilm (1983–2002); Creative Technology (2002–2016); Razer Inc. (2016–present)
- Website: thx.com

THX Ltd. is an American audio company based in the San Francisco Bay Area, known for its suite of digital high fidelity audiovisual reproduction standards for movie theaters, screening rooms, home theaters, computer speakers, car audio systems, video game consoles, and video games. The THX trailer that precedes compliant films is based on the Deep Note, with a distinctive glissando up from a rumbling low pitch.

THX was developed by Tomlinson Holman at George Lucas's company Lucasfilm in 1983 to ensure that the soundtrack for the third Star Wars film, Return of the Jedi, would be accurately reproduced in the best venues. THX was named after Holman's initials, with the "X" standing for "crossover" or "experiment". The name is also an homage to Lucas's first film, THX 1138 (1971). Deep Note was created by Holman's co-worker James A. Moorer.

THX is a quality assurance system, not a recording technology. All sound recording formats, whether digital (Dolby Digital, DTS, SDDS) or analog (Dolby Stereo, Ultra Stereo), can be reproduced in a THX system. THX-certified theaters provide a high-quality, predictable playback environment to ensure that any film soundtrack mixed in THX will sound as near as possible to the intentions of the mixing engineer. THX also provides certified theaters with a special crossover circuit whose use is part of the standard. Certification of an auditorium entails specific acoustic and other technical requirements; architectural requirements include a floating floor, baffled and acoustically treated walls, non-parallel walls (to reduce standing waves), a perforated screen (to allow center channel continuity), and NC30 rating for background noise ("ensures noise from air conditioning units and projection equipment does not mask the subtle effects in a movie's soundtrack").

On June 12, 2002, THX was spun off as a separate company from Lucasfilm and sold to the sound card manufacturer Creative Technology Limited, which held a 60% share of the company. Under Creative Technology, the company developed several further innovations, such as the first THX-certified audio card for computers, the Sound Blaster Audigy 2. In 2016, THX was acquired by American-Singaporean video game hardware company Razer Inc.

On September 12, 2024, THX announced Tuyen Pham as chief executive officer.

== History ==
=== Lucasfilm era, 1983–2002 ===
Tomlinson Holman, an audio engineer and scientist, had become an employee of Lucasfilm in 1980. In the process of enhancing the setup for the new Sprocket Systems theater, Holman, who was largely responsible for the theater's design, and Lucas invented a complex system that arranged speakers to best fit the architectural space. Using an intricate crossover network that integrated equipment with the room's unique acoustics, it was observed to be the highest quality theater sound system in existence. Sprocket Systems mixed the Return of the Jedi sound in the room, the first Lucasfilm production mixed in Northern California. Visiting filmmakers and studio executives were astounded at what they heard. Jim Kessler, who hired Holman, thought of calling the system "Tomlinson Holman's Crossover", or, as originally abbreviated, "XVR". He then changed the "VR" to "TH", but he realized that was the name for George Lucas' first film, THX 1138, and found that would be a fitting name. They eventually changed the "X"'s meaning to "experiment".

Four movie theaters in the United States fully installed THX sound systems, becoming the first THX-certified theaters. To introduce the new system, James A. Moorer created an ear-catching sound called the Deep Note. THX was dedicated on May 20, 1983, and the first trailer and Deep Note debuted on time with the release of Return of the Jedi in theaters five days later. It was billed as the first advance in motion picture loudspeaker systems since 1948.

In 1990, Lucasfilm unveiled the Home THX Audio System at the Consumer Electronics Show in Chicago. That year, a demo LaserDisc dubbed Wow! was unveiled. It featured various clips from Star Wars, Indiana Jones, and Willow. Three years later in 1993, the Special Edition cut of The Abyss became the first LaserDisc to receive the THX certification. In 1995, the Star Wars trilogy became the first THX certified VHS release. In 1997, Twister became the first THX certified release on the new DVD format.

In early 2002, it was announced that Lincoln became the first auto company to offer THX-certified premium car audio systems. A concept sound system for the Lincoln Blackwood showcased the potential for in-car multi-channel surround sound, demonstrated at the THX booth at the Consumer Electronics Show in Las Vegas. The license ensured that high-performance audio systems in Lincoln vehicles met the exacting sound quality and performance standards of its new THX Ultra Premium Car Audio program, beginning with the 2003 Lincoln LS, which was introduced later that year.

=== Creative Technology era, 2002–2016 ===
In June 2002, THX separated from Lucasfilm and became an independent company. The company's headquarters remained in Marin County, California, with offices in Burbank and plans for international expansion. It expanded into gaming and car audio systems. On the professional front, THX planned to continue the expansion of its theatrical certification programs as it became more involved in digital theater.

On September 30, 2003, THX announced its seal of approval for video game audio. Electronic Arts became the first company to achieve the game certification. This helped improve game sound, measuring the credibility of games at a time when the industry became important to the entertainment market. Five games by Electronic Arts, including Need for Speed: Underground, Medal of Honor: Rising Sun and The Lord of the Rings: The Return of the King carried logos on their box and pre-game trailers.

In 2006, THX began to certify new high definition Blu-ray discs, starting with Terminator 2: Judgment Day.

A 3D product certification called THX 3D Display debuted in 2010. The first 3D television to feature this technology was the LG Infinia PX950 Plasma HDTV series. To earn the new THX 3D Display Certification, the PX950 passed more than 400 laboratory tests evaluating left and right eye images for color accuracy, cross-talk, viewing angles, and video processing performance. The PX950 also had to pass THX certification for picture quality in 2D, which is required for THX 3D certification. Viewers can select THX 2D or 3D cinema modes for 2D or 3D playback from broadcast sources and Blu-ray discs. Four new THX-certified 3D JVC projectors were unveiled during this time: the Reference Series DLA-RS60 and DLA-RS50, marketed by JVC's Professional Products Company, and the Precision Series DLA-X9 and DLA-X7.

In early 2013, THX unveiled a new app called THX Tune-Up in time for the Super Bowl, available on the App Store and Google Play. It was billed as the company's first mobile app.

On March 14, 2013, THX filed a lawsuit against Apple Inc., alleging patent infringement, in a federal court in Northern California.

THX expanded to China in 2014 with new offices in Beijing and a partnership with China Film Group Corporation. The first THX Certified China Giant Screen (CGS) auditoriums opened in Shanghai in September.

In December 2014, THX collaborated with Warren Theatres, opening a large theater complex opened in Broken Arrow, Oklahoma on December 23. Each of the 18 auditoriums in this theater was THX-certified, and two new Grand Infinity Auditoriums were introduced. They were designed by Bill Warren to revolutionize the large format moviegoing experience. These auditoriums featured THX Certification, patented deep curved screens, 64-channel Dolby Atmos immersive surround sound and the first 4K laser projector in the United States.

=== Razer Inc. era, 2016–present ===
The company was acquired by Razer Inc. in October 2016. The first THX-certified laptop, the Razer Blade Pro, was released in 2017.

In 2018, THX introduced Spatial Audio, a new positional audio solution for an immersive 360-degree sound experience through headphones and speakers. The technology was used on the Kraken gaming headset for simulated 7.1 surround sound. These headphones were included with a Spatial Audio app. This would be later used on Windows 10 devices.

On May 2, 2018, it was announced that over 200 Cinemark XD locations in the United States and Latin America would feature a THX sound system. These auditoriums featured large wall-to-wall screens, 2D and 3D digital projection, immersive, surround sound, premium seats with Luxury Lounger electric recliners, and THX certification. Both companies had first announced the partnership a year prior in 2017. The first THX Ultimate Cinema debuted at Regency Westwood Village in Los Angeles in 2019. This theater provided exhibitors with a branded and differentiated PLF offering that included projection technology from Cinionic, and an immersive audio system, acoustics, and auditorium specifications that met THX certification standards.

In 2020, THX Certified Game Mode was introduced, with enhanced contrast and color, reduced input lag, and greater accuracy to the producers' intentions. It had judder and smear reduction, meaning that the picture remained crisp with a quick rise time between dark-to-light transitions. On August 3, TCL Technology revealed the first television to include THX Certified Game Mode, a 6-Series TCL Roku TV.

In September 2020, Walmart stores began to sell Gateway laptops and tablets tuned by THX, ensuring brighter contrast with rich, vibrant screen colors. They combined style, performance, and value in a wide range of products for consumers, students, and creators. The laptops featured THX Spatial Audio that delivered an authentic 7.1 surround experience through built-in speakers and attached headphones.

THX premiered its first consumer electronic product called the Onyx in 2021, a mobile headphone DAC and amplifier using THX AAA technology.

== Applications ==
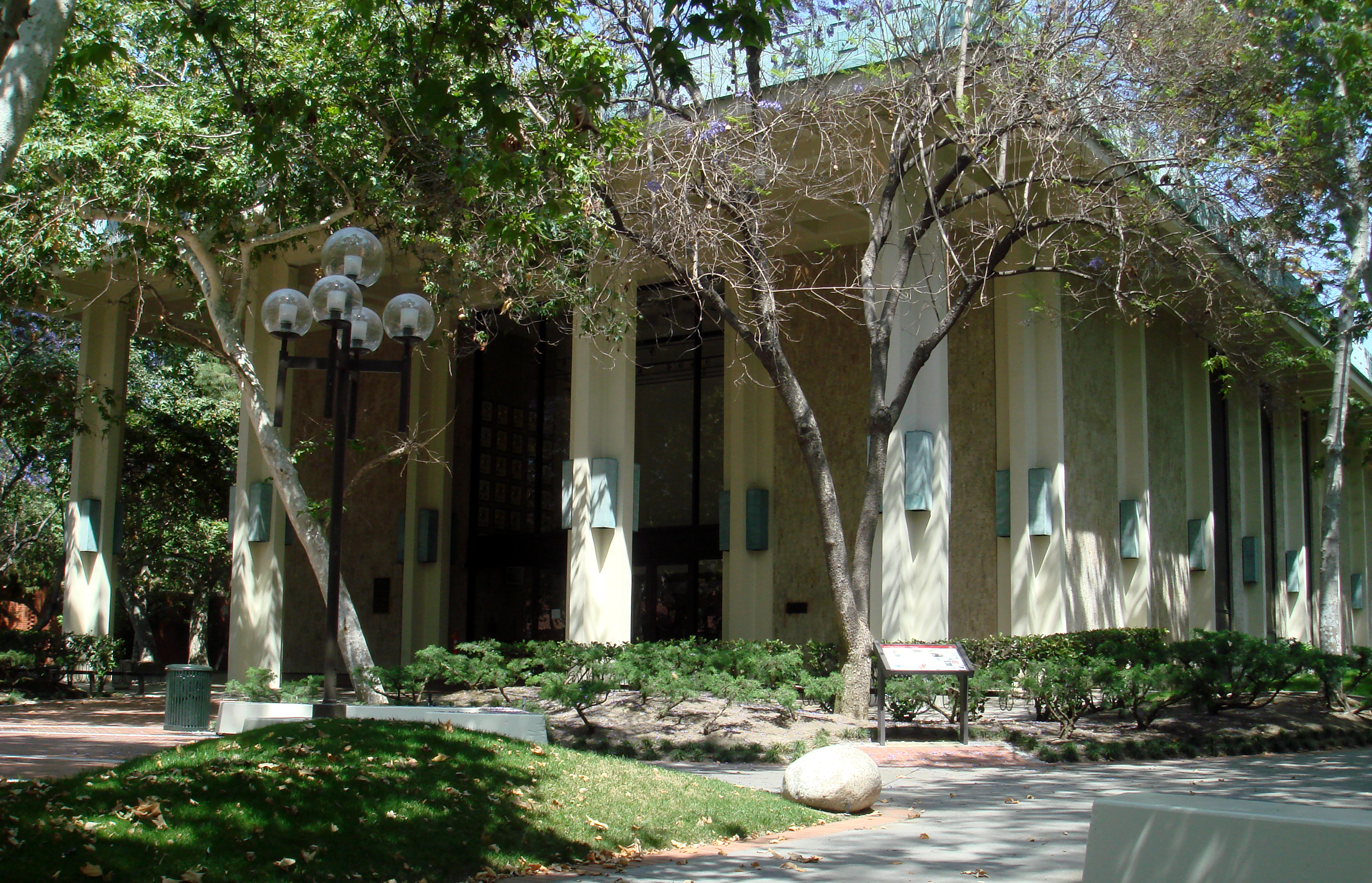
Norris Cinema Theatre, on the University of Southern California campus, is where THX was first developed and installed.

The first THX theater was the University of Southern California's Eileen L. Norris Cinema Theatre, a part of USC's film school.

== Certifications ==
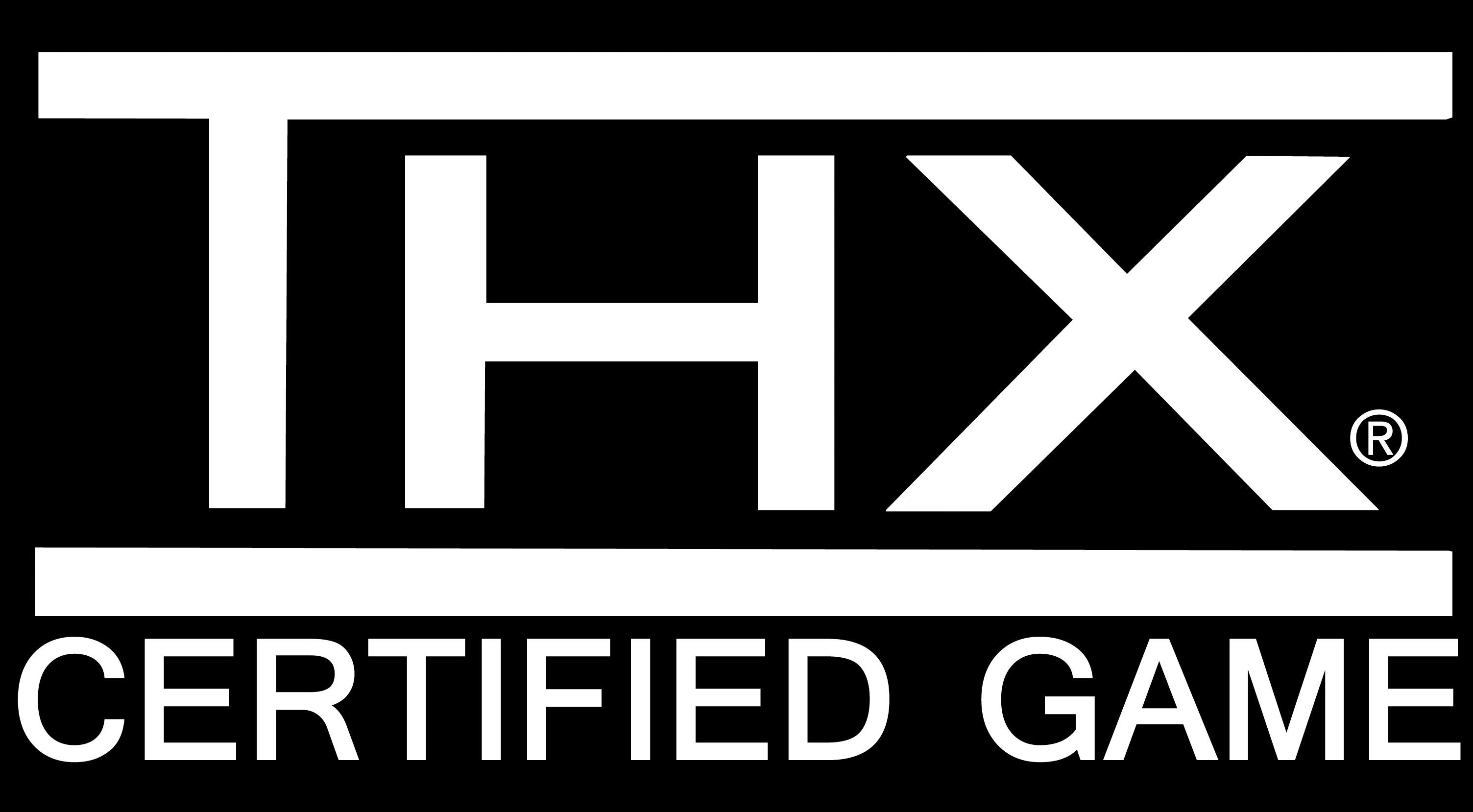
The "THX Certified Game" logo is commonly used on THX-certified video games.

THX has created a certification process for additional products including home audio, home theater, video, and automotive sound components and products. THX certification extends to home audio receivers, speakers, desktop systems, soundbars, acoustic materials, microphones, and HDMI cables.

=== THX Certified Ultra ===
THX Certified Ultra products are for larger home theaters, 3,000 cu ft (85 m^{3}) in size, with a viewing distance of 12 foot (3.7 m) or greater from the screen.

=== THX Certified Select ===
THX Certified Select products are for medium-sized rooms, up to 2,000 cu ft (57 m^{3}) in size, with a 10–12 foot (3.0–3.7 m) viewing distance from the screen.

=== THX Certified Compact ===
THX Certified Compact products for smaller sized rooms, up to 2,000 cu ft (57 m^{3}) in size, with an 8 foot (2.4 m) viewing distance from the screen.

=== THX Certified Dominus ===
THX Certified Dominus products are for expansive home theater spaces, 6,500 cu ft (180 m^{3}) in size, with a 20 foot (6.1 m) viewing distance from the screen.

=== I/S Plus Systems ===
THX's I/S Plus systems include an AV Receiver + Speaker Bundle and are certified to fill a small home theater or dorm room where the viewing distance from the screen is 6–8 feet (1.8–2.4 m). These THX certified home theater in a box systems are so far exclusively made by Onkyo. and Enclave Audio.

=== Multimedia products ===
THX Certified Multimedia Products are designed and engineered for PC gaming and multimedia on the desktop.

=== THX Certified Optimode and Optimizer ===
THX Certified DVD and video displays (plasma display and LCD or LED flat panels and projectors) including THX Optimode and Optimizer which allows users to see a program or the movie as originally intended. Some tests required the use of special "blue filter glasses," which would either be included with the Optimizer disc, or on the THX website at the time.

The first DVD release to include the THX Optimode was Fight Club, which was released on June 6, 2000.

== Mascot ==
Tex the Robot

THX's mascot is a robot named Tex. He first appeared in the original and extended Tex trailer (simply known as Tex 1 EX or Tex EX), which debuted in theaters with Independence Day on July 3, 1996, in which he fixes up the THX logo. A second trailer, Tex 2: Moo Can, in which he uses a moo can to perform the Deep Note, debuted in theaters on November 26, 1997, with Alien Resurrection. A later trailer featuring Tex titled Tex vs. the Robot, in which Tex and another robot named Bob try to place an orb into a socket in a spaceship, debuted on THX's YouTube channel on June 25, 2020, as a demo for the company's Spatial Audio technology.

== Deep Note ==
The Deep Note is the sound trademark of THX, being a distinctive synthesized crescendo that glissandos from a relatively narrow frequency spread (about 200–400 Hz) to a broader frequency spread (of about three octaves). It was created by James A. Moorer, a former employee of Lucasfilm's Computer Division (later known as Pixar Animation Studios) in late 1982. The sound is used on trailers for THX-certified movie theaters, home video releases, video games, and in-car entertainment systems.

The Deep Note was partially previewed on the opening track of the 1983 album The Digital Domain: A Demonstration, where it was included among sound effects that were combined with the Deep Note itself. The Deep Note debuted later that same year at the premiere of Return of the Jedi in L.A.

== See also ==
- Home cinema
- AV receiver
- Surround sound
- Sound card
