= Compact disc manufacturing =

Mass replication process for CDs

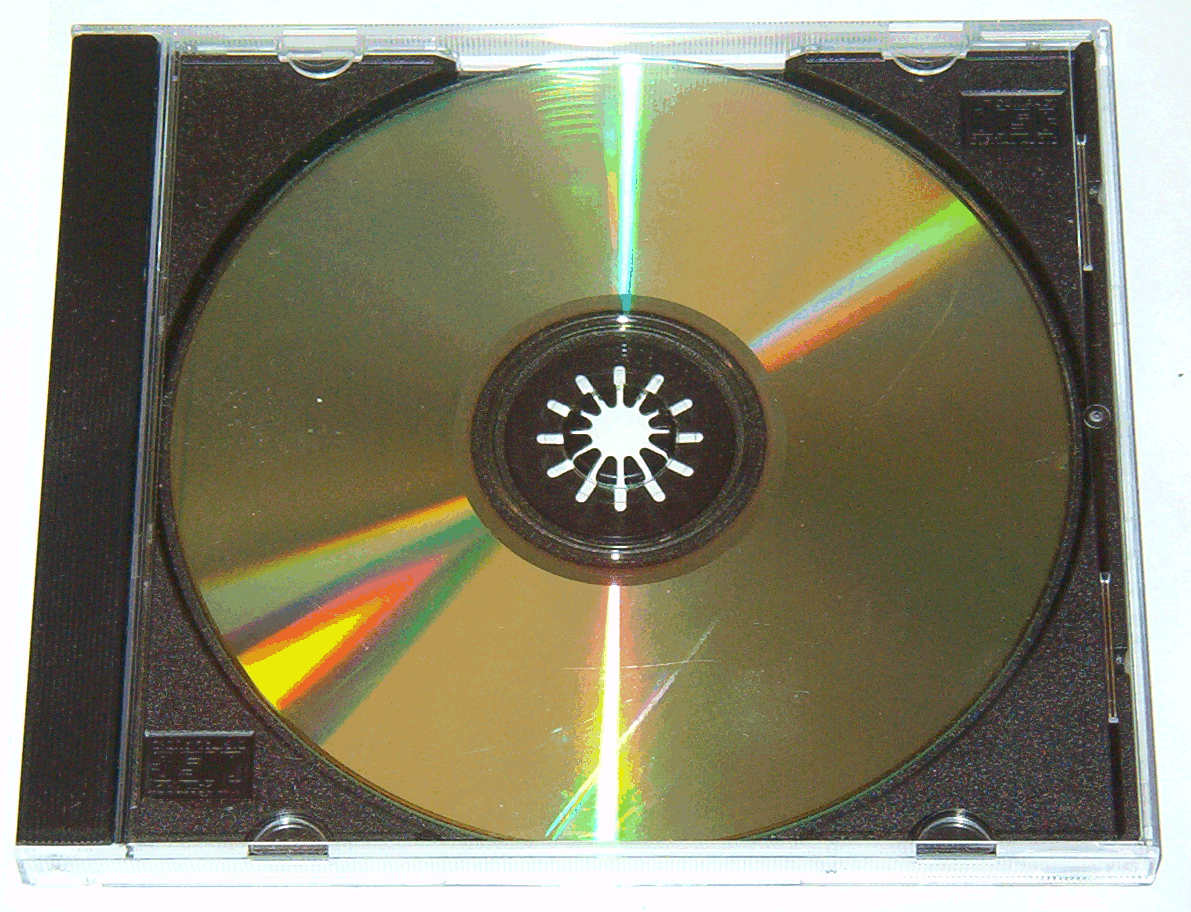
A compact disc in its jewel case.

Compact disc manufacturing is the process by which commercial compact discs (CDs) are replicated in mass quantities using a master version created from a source recording. This may be either in audio form (CD-DA) or data form (CD-ROM). This process is used in the mastering of read-only compact discs. DVDs and Blu-rays use similar methods (see Optical Disc § Optical disc manufacturing).

A CD can be used to store audio, video, and data in various standardized formats defined in the Rainbow Books. CDs are usually manufactured in a class 100 (ISO 5) or better clean room, to avoid contamination which would result in data corruption. They can be manufactured to strict manufacturing tolerances for only a few US cents per disk.

Replication differs from duplication (i.e. burning used for CD-Rs and CD-RWs) as the pits and lands of a replicated CD are moulded into a CD blank, rather than being burn marks in a dye layer (in CD-Rs) or areas with changed physical characteristics (in CD-RWs). In addition, CD burners write data sequentially, while a CD pressing plant forms the entire disk in one physical stamping operation, similar to record pressing.

== Premastering ==
All CDs are pressed from a digital data source, with the most common sources being low error-rate CD-Rs or files from an attached computer hard drive containing the finished data (e. g., music or computer data). Some CD pressing systems can use digital master tapes, either in Digital Audio Tape, Exabyte, Digital Linear Tape, Digital Audio Stationary Head or Umatic formats. A PCM adaptor is used to record and retrieve digital audio data into and from an analog videocassette format such as Umatic or Betamax. However, such sources are suitable only for production of audio CDs due to error detection and correction issues. If the source is not a CD, the table of contents for the CD to be pressed must also be prepared and stored on a tape or hard drive. In all cases except CD-R sources, the tape must be uploaded to a media mastering system to create the TOC (Table of Contents) for the CD. Creative processing of the mixed audio recordings often occurs in conventional CD premastering sessions. While "mastering" is commonly used by laypeople to describe this phase, official industry terminology refers to it as "premastering," as it precedes the creation of the glass master from which stamper plates are electroformed.

== Mastering ==
=== Glass mastering ===
Glass mastering is performed in a class 100 (ISO 5) or better clean room or a self-enclosed clean environment within the mastering system. Contaminants introduced during critical stages of manufacturing (e.g., dust, pollen, hair, or smoke) can cause sufficient errors to make a master unusable. Once successfully completed, a CD master will be less susceptible to the effects of these contaminants.

During glass mastering, glass is used as a substrate to hold the CD master image while it is created and processed; hence the name. Glass substrates, noticeably larger than a CD, are round plates of glass approximately 240 mm in diameter and 6 mm thick. They often also have a small, steel hub on one side to facilitate handling. The substrates are created especially for CD mastering and one side is polished until it is extremely smooth. Even microscopic scratches in the glass will affect the quality of CDs pressed from the master image. The extra area on the substrate allows for easier handling of the glass master and reduces the risk of damage to the pit and land structure when the "father" stamper is removed from the glass substrate.

Once the glass substrate is cleaned using detergents and ultrasonic baths, the glass is placed in a spin coater. The spin coater rinses the glass blank with a solvent and then applies either photoresist or dye-polymer depending on the mastering process. Rotation spreads photoresist or dye-polymer coating evenly across the surface of the glass. The substrate is removed and baked to dry the coating and the glass substrate is ready for mastering.

Once the glass is ready for mastering, it is placed in a laser beam recorder (LBR). Most LBRs are capable of mastering at greater than 1x speed, but due to the weight of the glass substrate and the requirements of a CD master they are typically mastered at no greater than 8x playback speed. The LBR uses a laser to write the information, with a wavelength and final lens NA (numerical aperture) chosen to produce the required pit size on the master blank. For example, DVD pits are smaller than CD pits, so a shorter wavelength or higher NA (or both) is needed for DVD mastering. LBRs use one of two recording techniques; photoresist and non-photoresist mastering. Photoresist also comes in two variations; positive photoresist and negative photoresist.

=== Photoresist mastering ===
Photoresist mastering uses a light-sensitive material (a photoresist) to create the pits and lands on the CD master blank. The laser beam recorder uses a deep blue or ultraviolet laser to write the master. When exposed to the laser light, the photoresist undergoes a chemical reaction which either hardens it (in the case of negative photoresist) or to the contrary makes it more soluble (in the case of positive photoresist).

Once the mastering is complete, the glass master is removed from the LBR and chemically 'developed'. The exposed area is then soaked in a developer solution which removes the exposed positive photoresist or the unexposed negative photoresist. Once developing is finished, the glass master is metalized to provide a surface for the stamper to be formed onto. It is then polished with lubricant and wiped down.

=== Non-photoresist or dye-polymer mastering ===
When a laser is used to record on the dye-polymer used in non-photoresist (NPR) mastering, the dye-polymer absorbs laser energy focused in a precise spot; this vapourises and forms a pit in the surface of the dye-polymer. This pit can be scanned by a red laser beam that follows the cutting beam, and the quality of the recording can be directly and immediately assessed; for instance, audio signals being recorded can also be played straight from the glass master in real time. The pit geometry and quality of the playback can all be adjusted while the CD is being mastered, as the blue writing laser and the red read laser are typically connected via a feedback system to optimise the recording. This allows the dye-polymer LBR to produce very consistent pits even if there are variations in the dye-polymer layer. Another advantage of this method is that pit depth variation can be programmed during recording to compensate for downstream characteristics of the local production process (e.g., marginal molding performance). This cannot be done with photoresist mastering because the pit depth is set by the PR coating thickness, whereas dye-polymer pits are cut into a coating thicker than the intended pits.

This type of mastering is called Direct Read After Write (DRAW) and is the main advantage of some non-photoresist recording systems. Problems with the quality of the glass blank master, such as scratches, or an uneven dye-polymer coating, can be immediately detected. If required, the mastering can be halted, saving time and increasing throughput.

== Post-mastering ==
After mastering, the glass master is baked to harden the developed surface material to prepare it for metalisation. Metalisation is a critical step prior to electrogalvanic manufacture (electroplating).

The developed glass master is placed in a vapour deposition metallizer which uses a combination of mechanical vacuum pumps and cryopumps to lower the total vapour pressure inside a chamber to a hard vacuum. A piece of nickel wire is then heated in a tungsten boat to white-hot temperature and the nickel vapour deposited onto the rotating glass master. The glass master is coated with the nickel vapour up to a typical thickness of around 400 nm.

The finished glass masters are inspected for stains, pinholes or incomplete coverage of the nickel coating and passed to the next step in the mastering process.

== Electroforming ==
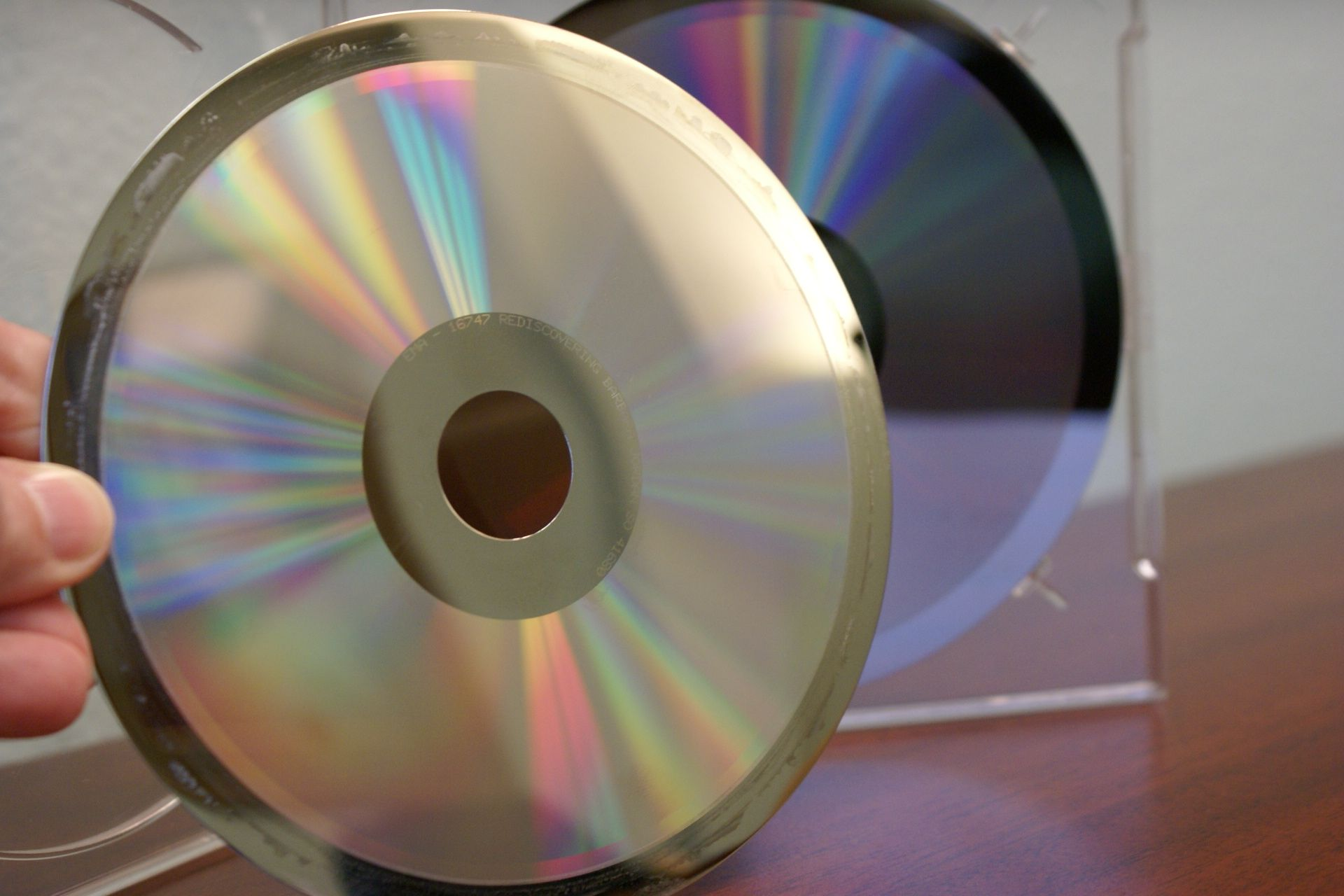
Example of a stamper used in the compact disc replication process

Electroforming occurs in "Matrix", the name used for the electroforming process area in many plants; it is also a class 100 (ISO 5) or better clean room. The data (music, computer data, etc.) on the metalised glass master is extremely easy to damage and must be transferred to a tougher form for use in the injection moulding equipment which actually produces the end-product optical disks.

The metalised master is clamped in a conductive electrodeposition frame with the data side facing outwards and lowered into an electroforming tank. The specially prepared and controlled tank water contains a nickel salt solution (usually nickel sulfamate) at a particular concentration which may be adjusted slightly in different plants depending on the characteristics of the prior steps. The solution is carefully buffered to maintain its pH, and organic contaminants must be kept below one part in five million for good results. The bath is heated to approximately 50 °C.

The glass master is rotated in the electroforming tank while a pump circulates the electroforming solution over the surface of the master. As the electroforming progresses, nickel is not electroplated onto the surface of the glass master, since that would preclude separation. Plating is rather eschewed through passivation and, initially, because the glass is not electroconductive. Instead, the metal coating on the glass disc, actually reverse-plates onto the nickel (not the mandrel) which is being electrodeposited by the attraction of the electrons on the cathode, which presents itself as the metal-coated glass mistress, or, premaster mandrel. Electroplating, on the other hand, would have entailed electrodeposition directly to the mandrel along with the intention of it staying adhered. That, and the more rigorous requirements of temperature control and purity of bathwater, are the main differences between the two disciplines of electrodeposition. The metal stamper first struck from the metal-coated glass is the metal master (and we shouldn't make a master from another master as that would not follow the nomenclature of the sequence of siring that is germane to electroforming) This is clearly a method opposite to normal electroplating. Another difference to electroplating is that the internal stress of the nickel must be controlled carefully, or the nickel stamper will not be flat. The solution cleanliness is important but is achieved by continuous filtration and usual anode bagging systems. Another large difference is that the stamper thickness must be controlled to ±2% of the final thickness so that it will fit on the injection moulding machines with very high tolerances of gassing rings and centre clamps. This thickness control requires electronic current control and baffles in the solution to control distribution. The current must start off quite low as the metallised layer is too thin to take large currents, and is increased steadily. As the thickness of the nickel on the glass "mistress" increases, the current can be increased. The full electroforming current density is very high with the full thickness of usually 0.3 mm taking approximately one hour. The part is removed from the tank and the metal layer carefully separated from the glass substrate. If plating occurs, the process must be begun anew, from the glass mastering phase. The metal part, now called a "father", has the desired data as a series of bumps rather than pits. The injection moulding process works better by flowing around high points rather than into pits on the metal surface. The father is washed with deionised water and other chemicals such as ammonical hydrogen peroxide, sodium hydroxide or acetone to remove all trace of resist or other contaminants. The glass master can be sent for reclamation, cleaning and checking before reuse. If defects are detected, it will be discarded or repolished recycled.

Once cleaned of any loose nickel and resist, the father surface is washed and the passivated, either electrically or chemically, which allows the next plated layer to separate from the father. This layer is an atomic layer of absorbed oxygen that does not alter the physical surface. The father is clamped back into a frame and returned to the plating tank. This time the metal part that is grown is the mirror image of the father and is called a "mother"; as this is now pits, it cannot be used for moulding.

The mother-father sandwich is carefully separated and the mother is then washed, passivated and returned to the electroforming baths to have a mirror image produced on it called a son. Most moulded CDs are produced from sons.

Mothers can be regrown from fathers if they become damaged, or a very long run. If handled correctly, there is no limit to the number of stampers that can be grown from a single mother before the quality of the stamper is reduced unacceptably. Fathers can be used as a stamper, directly, if a very fast turnaround is required, or if the yield is 100%, in which case the father would be wastefully stored. At the end of a run, the mother is certainly to be stored.

A father, mother, and a collection of stampers (sometimes called "sons") are known collectively as a "family". Fathers and mothers are the same size as a glass substrate, typically 300 μm in thickness. Stampers do not require the extra space around the outside of the program area and they are punched to remove the excess nickel from outside and inside the information area in order to fit the mould of the injection moulding machine (IMM). The physical dimensions of the mould vary depending on the injection tooling being used.

== Replication ==
CD moulding machines are specifically designed high temperature polycarbonate injection moulders. They have an average throughput of 550-900 discs per hour, per moulding line. Clear polycarbonate pellets are first dried at around 130 degrees Celsius for three hours (nominal; this depends on which optical grade resin is in use) and are fed via vacuum transport into one end of the injection moulder's barrel (i.e., the feed throat) and are moved to the injection chamber via a large screw inside the barrel. The barrel, wrapped with heater bands ranging in temperature from ca 210 to 320 degrees Celsius melts the polycarbonate. When the mould is closed the screw moves forward to inject molten plastic into the mould cavity. When the mould is full, cool water running through mould halves, outside the cavity, cools the plastic so it somewhat solidifies. The entire process from the mould closing, injection and opening again takes approximately 3 to 5 seconds.

The moulded "disc" (referred to as a 'green' disc, lacking final processing) is removed from the mould by vacuum handling; high-speed robot arms with vacuum suction caps. They are moved onto the finishing line infeed conveyor, or cooling station, in preparation for metallisation. At this point the discs are clear and contain all the digital information desired; however, they cannot be played because there is no reflective layer.

The discs pass, one at a time, into the metallizer, a small chamber at approximately 10^{−3} Torr (130 mPa) vacuum. The process is called 'sputtering'. The metallizer contains a metal "target" – almost always an alloy of (mostly) aluminium and small amounts of other metals. There is a load-lock system (similar to an airlock) so the process chamber can be kept at high vacuum as the discs are exchanged. When the disc is rotated into the processing position by a swivel arm in the vacuum chamber, a small dose of argon gas is injected into the process chamber and a 700 volt DC electric current at up to 20 kW is applied to the target. This produces a plasma from the target, and the plasma vapour is deposited onto the disc; it is an anode-cathode transfer. The metal coats the data side of the disc (upper surface), covering the pit and lands. This metal layer is the reflective surface which can be seen on the reverse (non-label side) of a CD. This thin layer of metal is subject to corrosion from various contaminants and so is protected by a thin layer of lacquer.

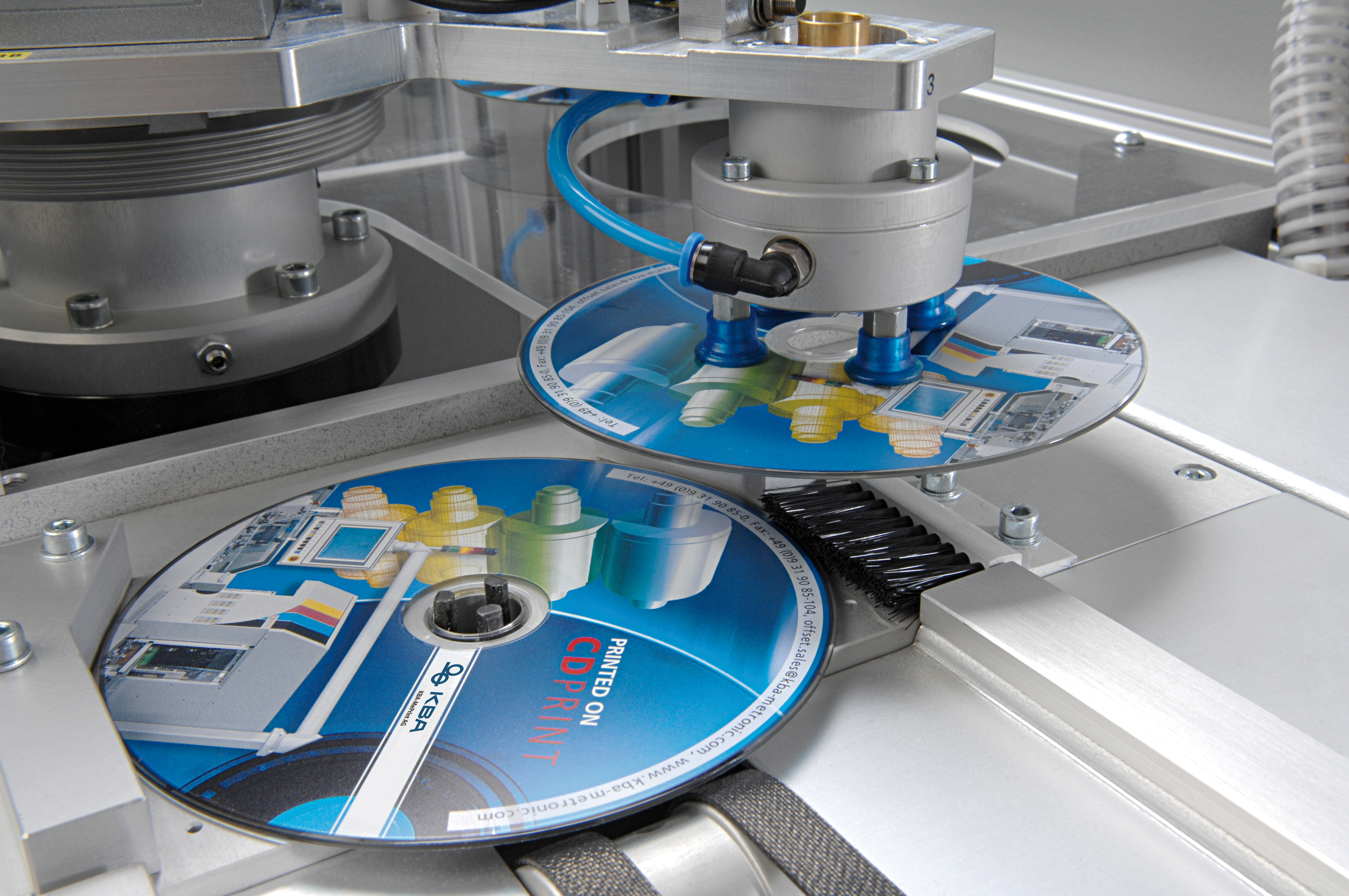
CDs are printed in waterless offset

After metalisation, the discs pass on to a spin-coater, where UV curable lacquer is dispensed onto the newly metallized layer. By rapid spinning, the lacquer coats the entire disc with a very thin layer (approximately 5 to 10 μm). After the lacquer is applied, the discs pass under a high-intensity UV lamp which cures the lacquer rapidly. The lacquer also provides a surface for a label, generally screen printed or offset printed. The printing ink(s) must be chemically compatible with the lacquer used. Markers used by consumers to write on blank surfaces can lead to breaks in the protective lacquer layer, which may lead to corrosion of the reflective layer, and failure of the CD.

== Testing ==
For quality control, both the stamper and the moulded discs are tested before a production run. Samples of the disc (test pressings) are taken during long production runs and tested for quality consistency. Pressed discs are analyzed on a signal analysis machine. The metal stamper can also be tested on a signal analysis machine which has been specially adapted (larger diameter, more fragile, ...).

The machine will scan the disc or stamper and measure various physical and electrical parameters. Errors can be introduced at every step of production, but the moulding process is the least subject to adjustment. Sources of errors are more readily identified and compensated for during mastering. If the errors are too severe then the stamper is rejected and a replacement installed. An experienced machine operator can interpret the report from the analysis system and optimise the moulding process to make a disc that meets the required Rainbow Book specification (e.g. Red Book for Audio from the Rainbow Books series).

If no defects are found, the CD continues to printing so a label can be screen or offset printed on the top surface of the disc. Thereafter, discs are counted, packaged, and shipped.

== Manufacturers ==
- Cinram (former)
- Moser Baer
- Ritek
- Sony DADC

== See also ==
- CD publishing
- Optical disc authoring
