= Bicycle stairway =

Pedestrian stairway with a ramp

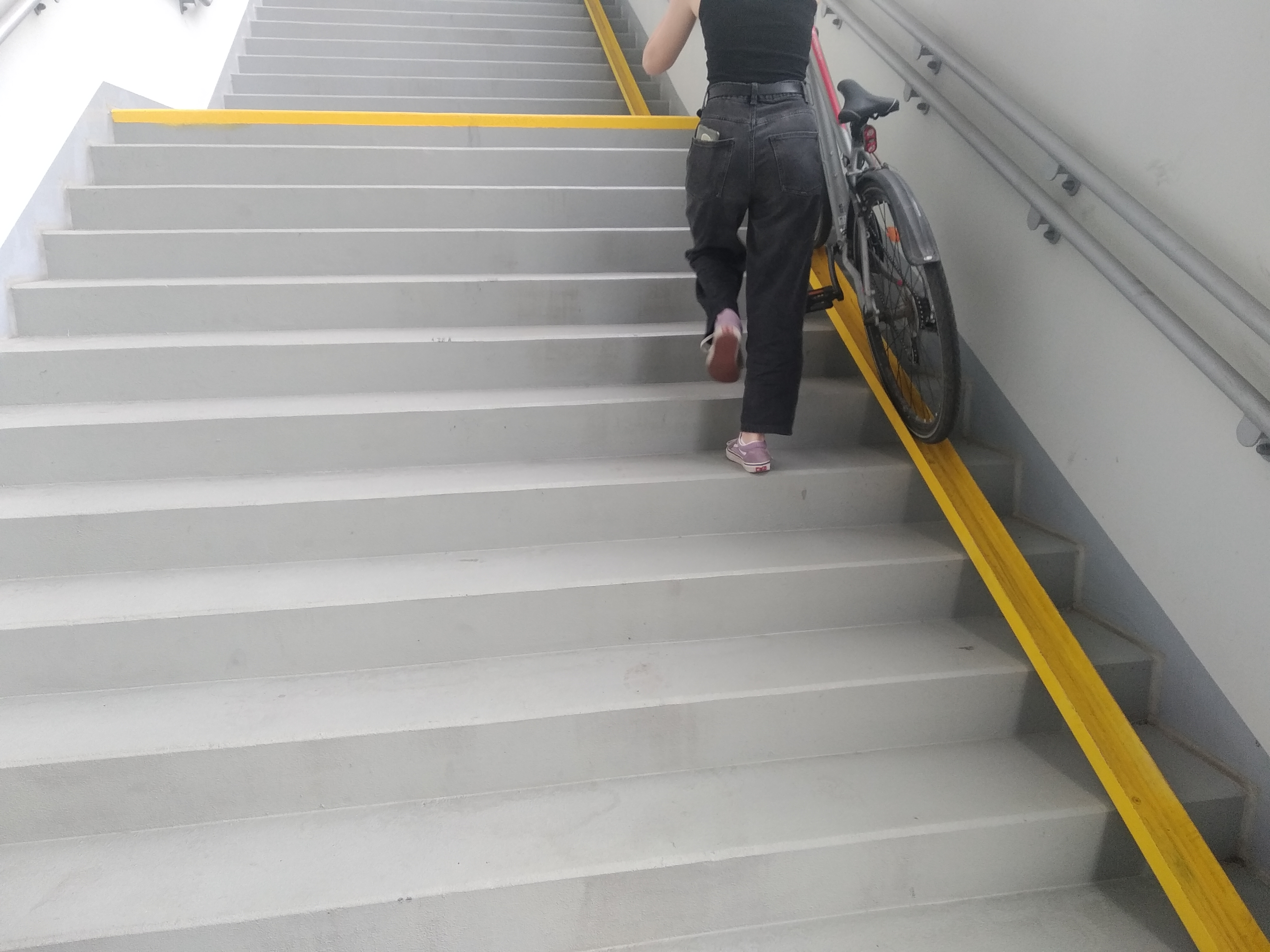
A bike ramp in Poland.

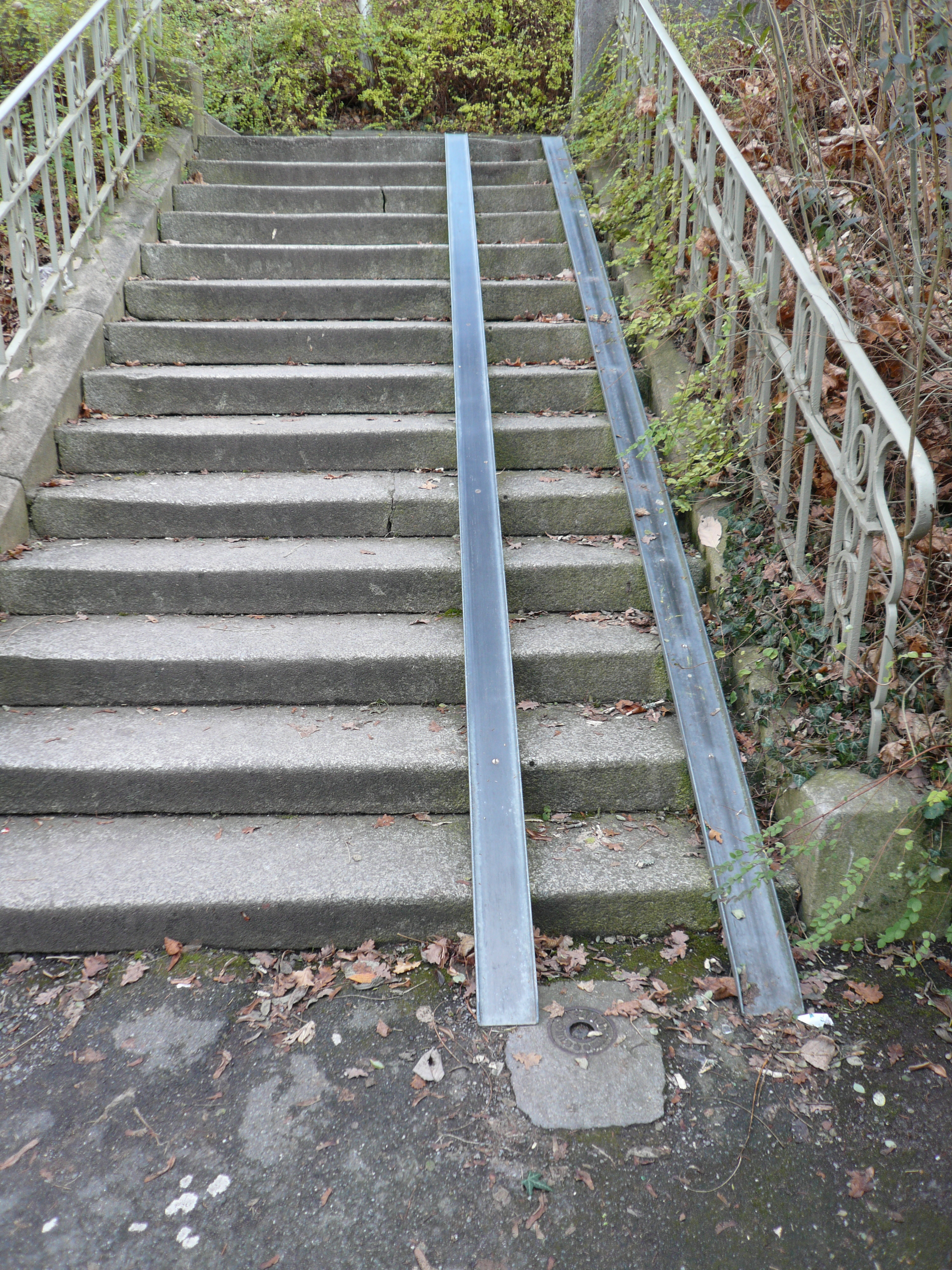
Retrofitted ramps (these are also intended for push chairs/prams.

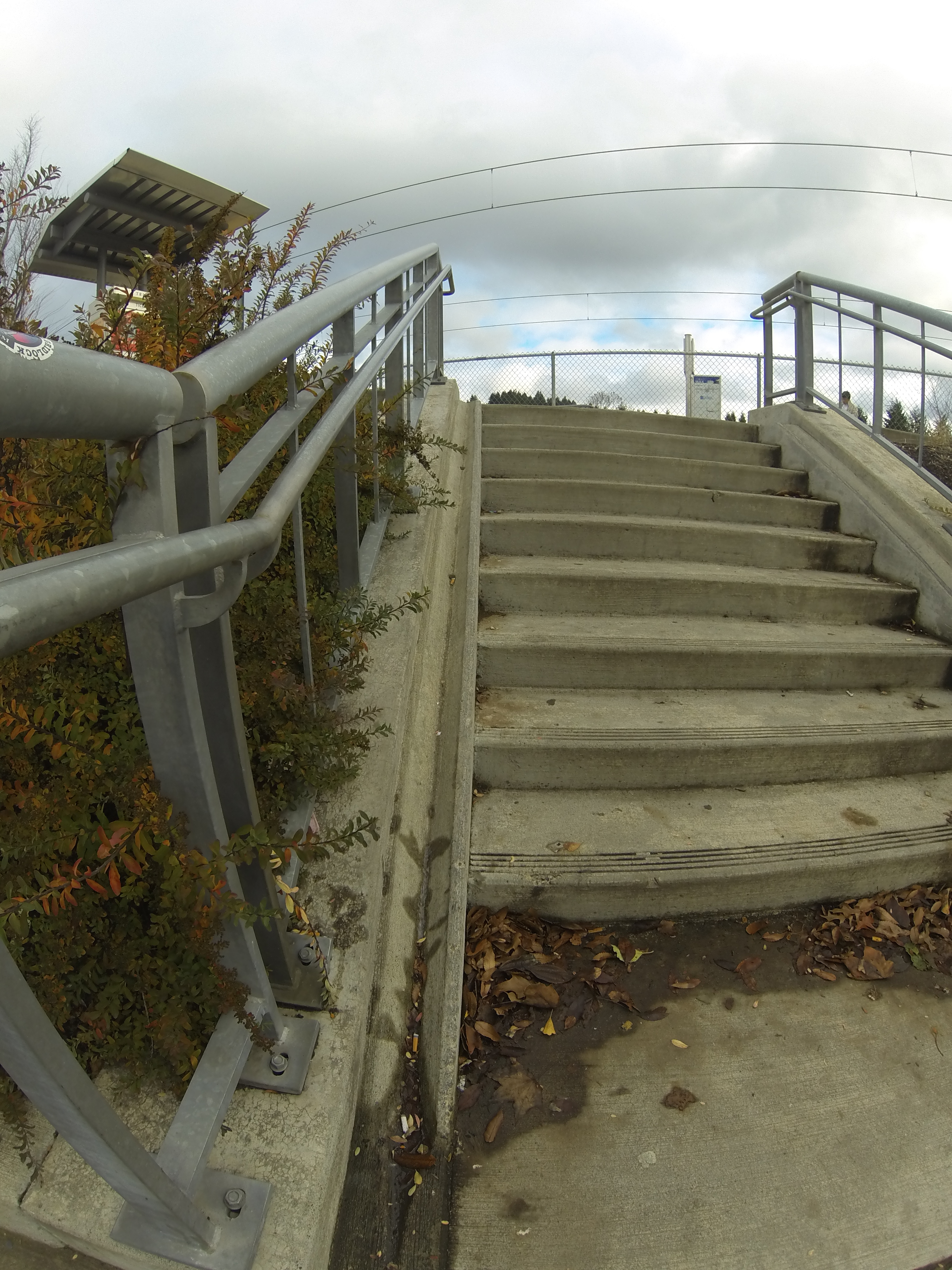
V-shaped bicycle stairway beside a short staircase

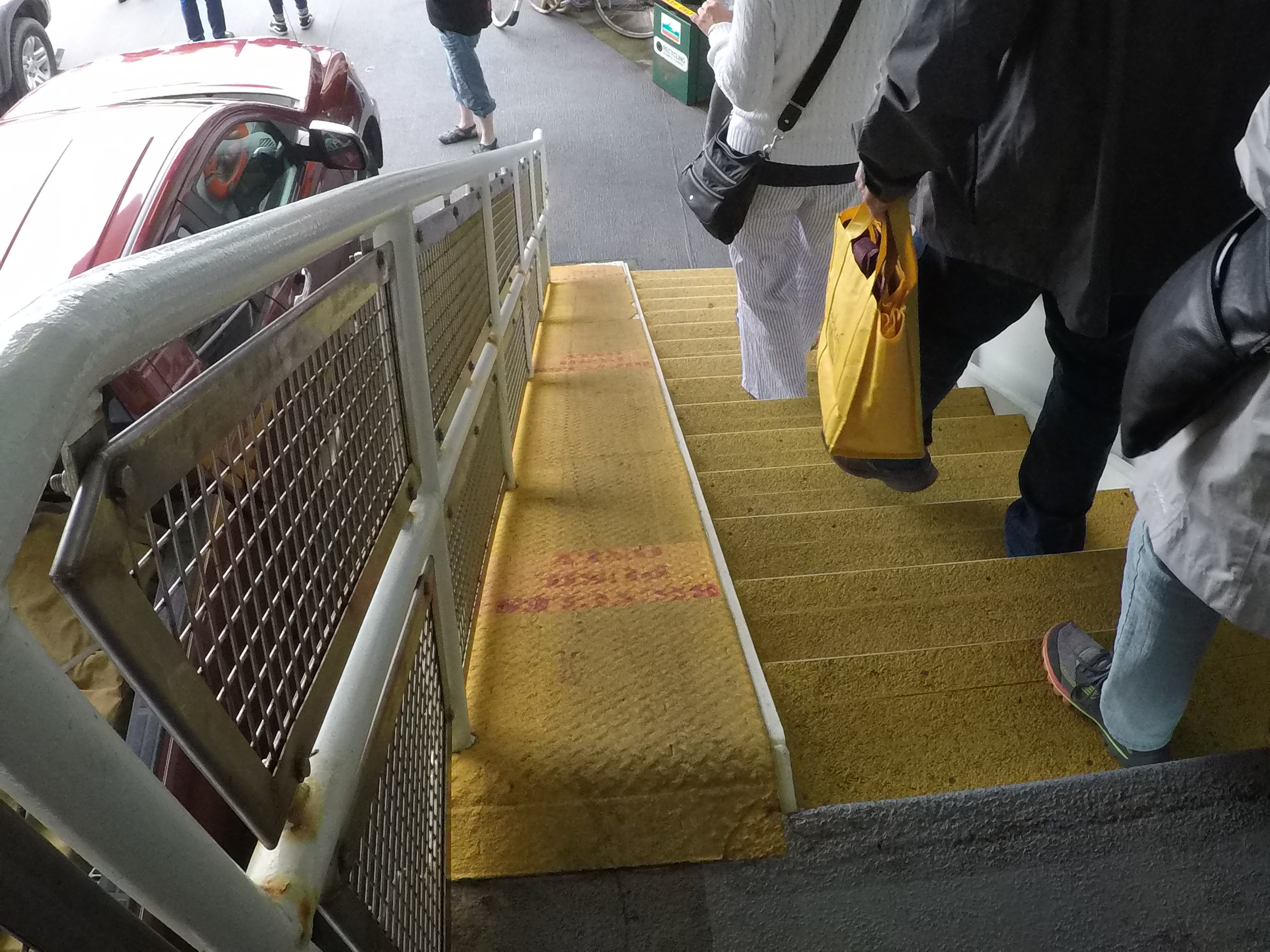
Bicycle stairway within a vehicle ferry

A bicycle stairway is a pedestrian stairway which also has a channel alongside it to facilitate walking a bicycle up or down the stairway.

The channel itself is also often called a wheeling ramp, push ramp or runnel. There is no standard in the dimensions, materials, or shape used in the channel, however the channel is intended to be sufficient to guide a variety of bicycle tires without binding or causing damage. Cross-section shapes vary, but are usually either nearly rectangular, V-, U- or L-shaped. Depth is generally 2 to 6 cm (1 to 2.5 inches) and width 6 to 13 cm (2.5 to 5 inches). If the stairs do not turn and are relatively short, a flat cross section without sidewalls may suffice. The channel is an inclined plane within easy reach of someone using the stairs. There may be level portions for resting or passing. While most examples of existing bicycle stairs feature permanent or built-in channels, Oregon Health & Science University has invested in the development of a modular, after-market, retrofitting "bicycle gutter" device that was awarded patents in 2011 and 2012.

Accessibility requirements for handrails tend to conflict with bicycle stairways, as handrails may obstruct or decrease the control of a bicyclist using the channel. Suggestions for resolving the conflicts include providing a single handrail down the middle of the stairs with gutters at the outside edges, or placing handrails at both edges and placing the gutter in the middle. However, the Toronto Transit Commission is testing channels placed next to handrails. Some users have commented about the disadvantages, such as pedals catching on the stairs' handrail.

Bicycle stairways may have arisen in reaction to wear and compaction beside outdoor stairways where people preferred to roll their bicycle on smooth lawn or soil instead of carrying it or having it bump along the stairs.

== See also ==
- Bicycle escalator (a powered version of a bicycle staircase)
- Cycling infrastructure
