= Trampe bicycle lift =

Pedal bicycle lift

Coordinates: 63°25′41″N 10°24′14″E

Trampe
- Type: Bicycle lift
- Location: Trondheim, Norway
- Built: 1993
- Rebuilt: 2013
- Builder: Skirail
- Gradient: 20% (1:5)
- Length: 130m
- Speed: 1.5–2 m/s (~7 km/h)
- Propulsion: Electric

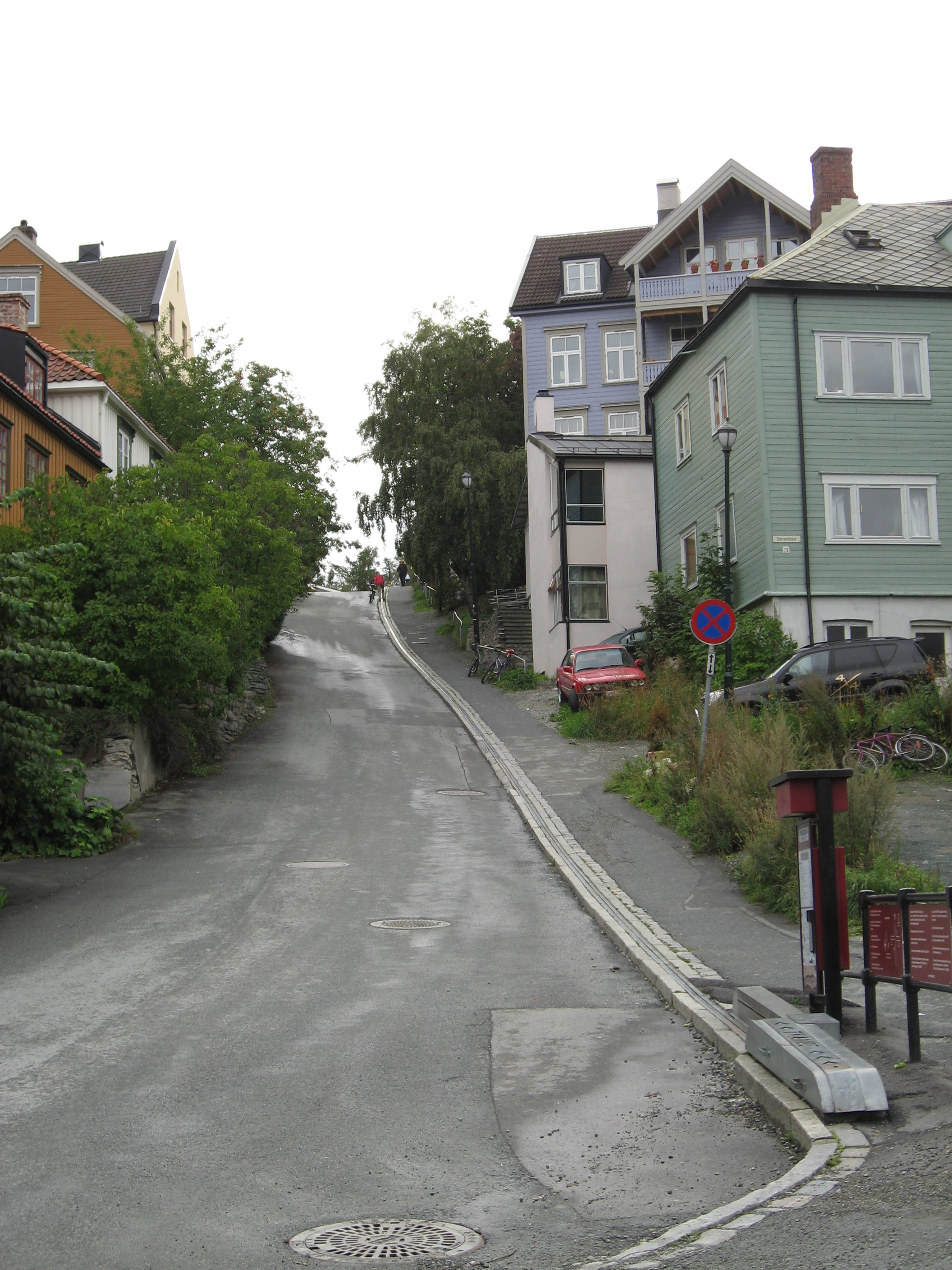
The Trampe bicycle lift runs up the curb side of Brubakken in Bakklandet.

The Trampe bicycle lift (Norwegian: Sykkelheisen Trampe) is a bicycle lift in Trondheim, Norway, invented and installed in 1993 by Jarle Wanwik.

In 2013 it was upgraded and rebranded under the name CycloCable by Skirail, part of the Poma group.

== Usage ==
Use of the Trampe bicycle lift is free. When using the lift, the right foot is placed on the starting point (the left foot stays on the bicycle pedal). After pushing the start button, the user is pushed forward and a footplate emerges. A common mistake among tourists and other first-time users is that they don't keep their right leg outstretched and their body tilted forward. This makes it hard to maintain balance on the footplate, and can result in falling off.

In the summer months, Trampe is used extensively by both commuting inhabitants of Trondheim as well as tourists.

== Gallery ==
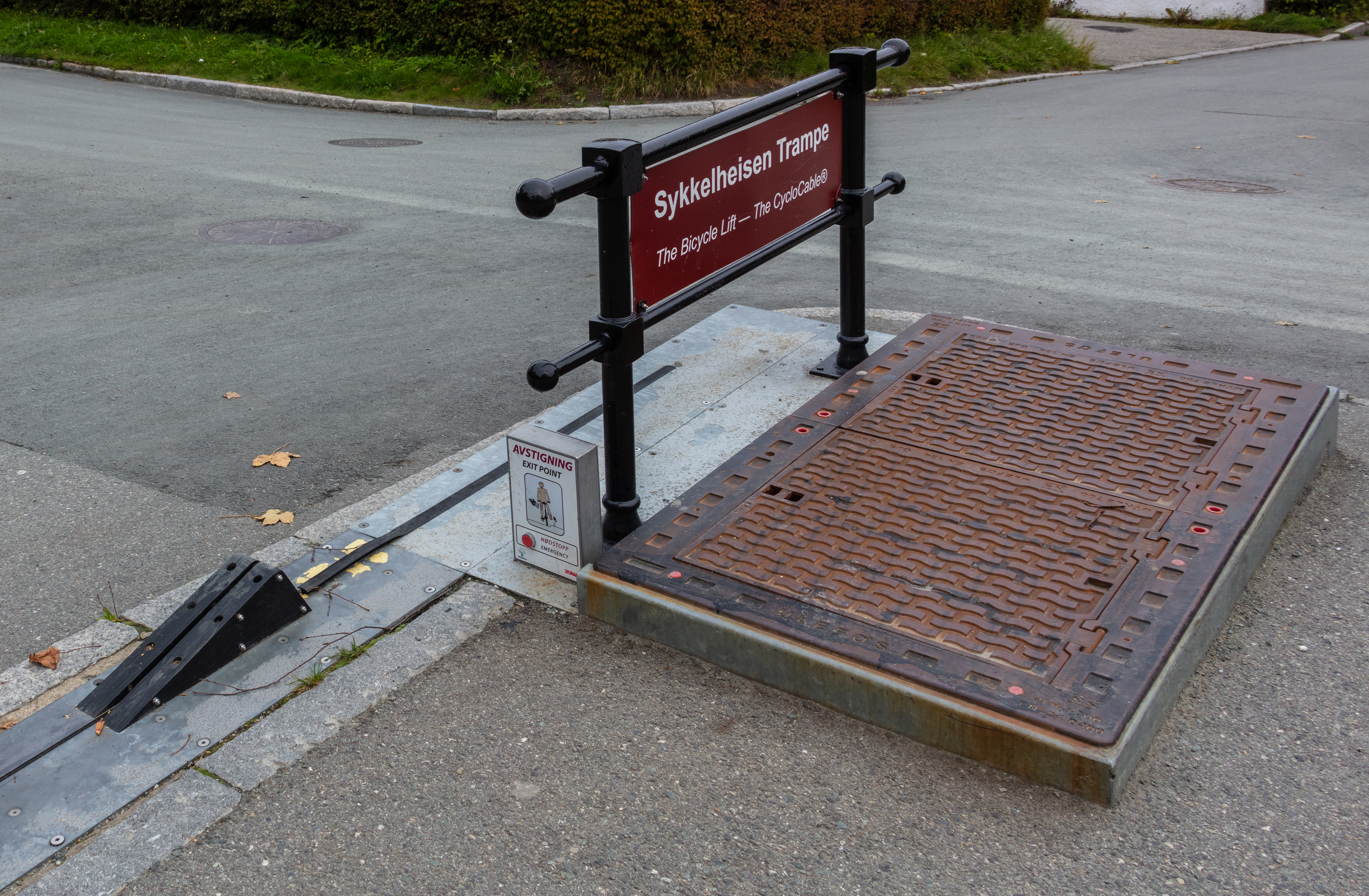

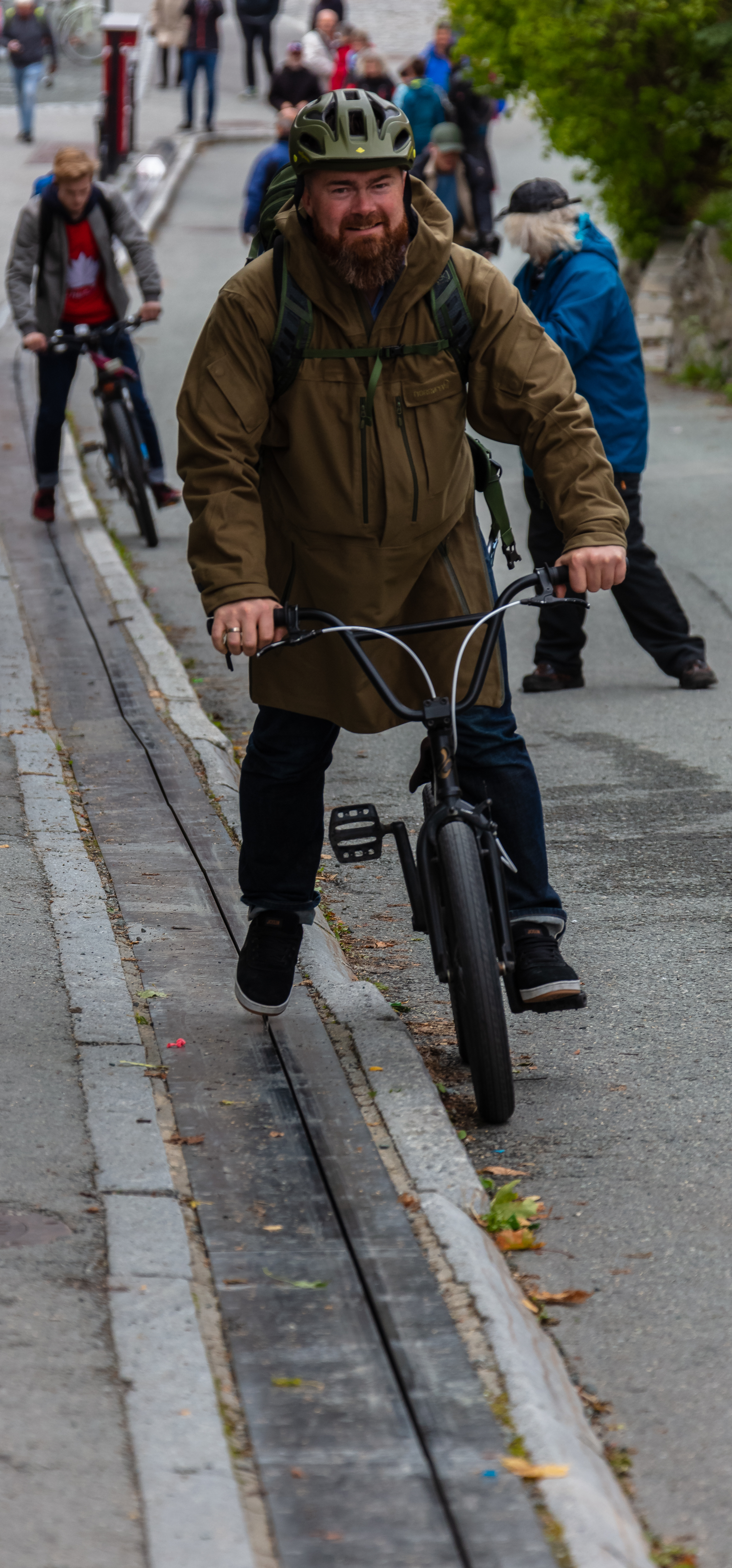

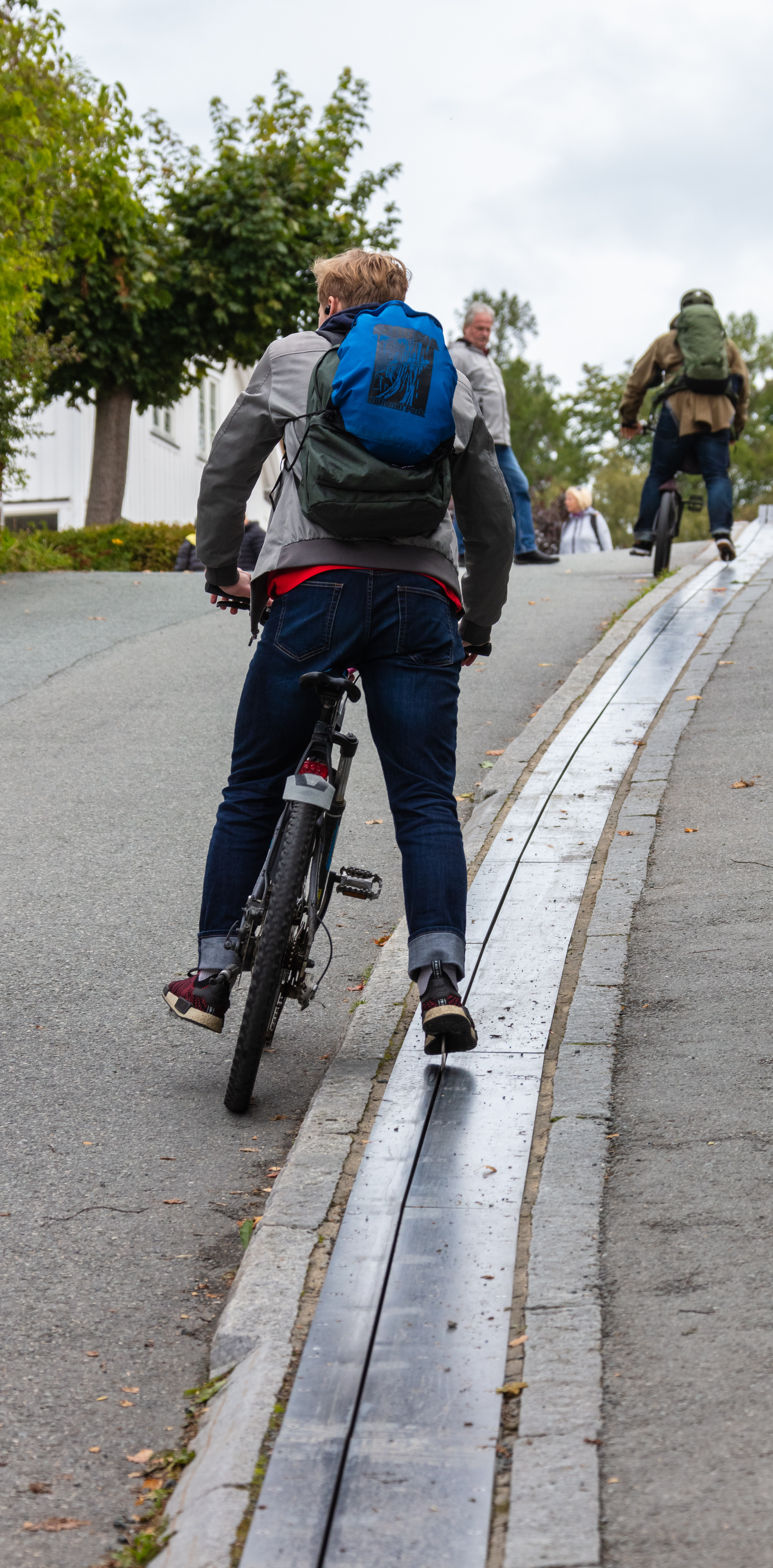
