= Staircase =

Room where stairs are located

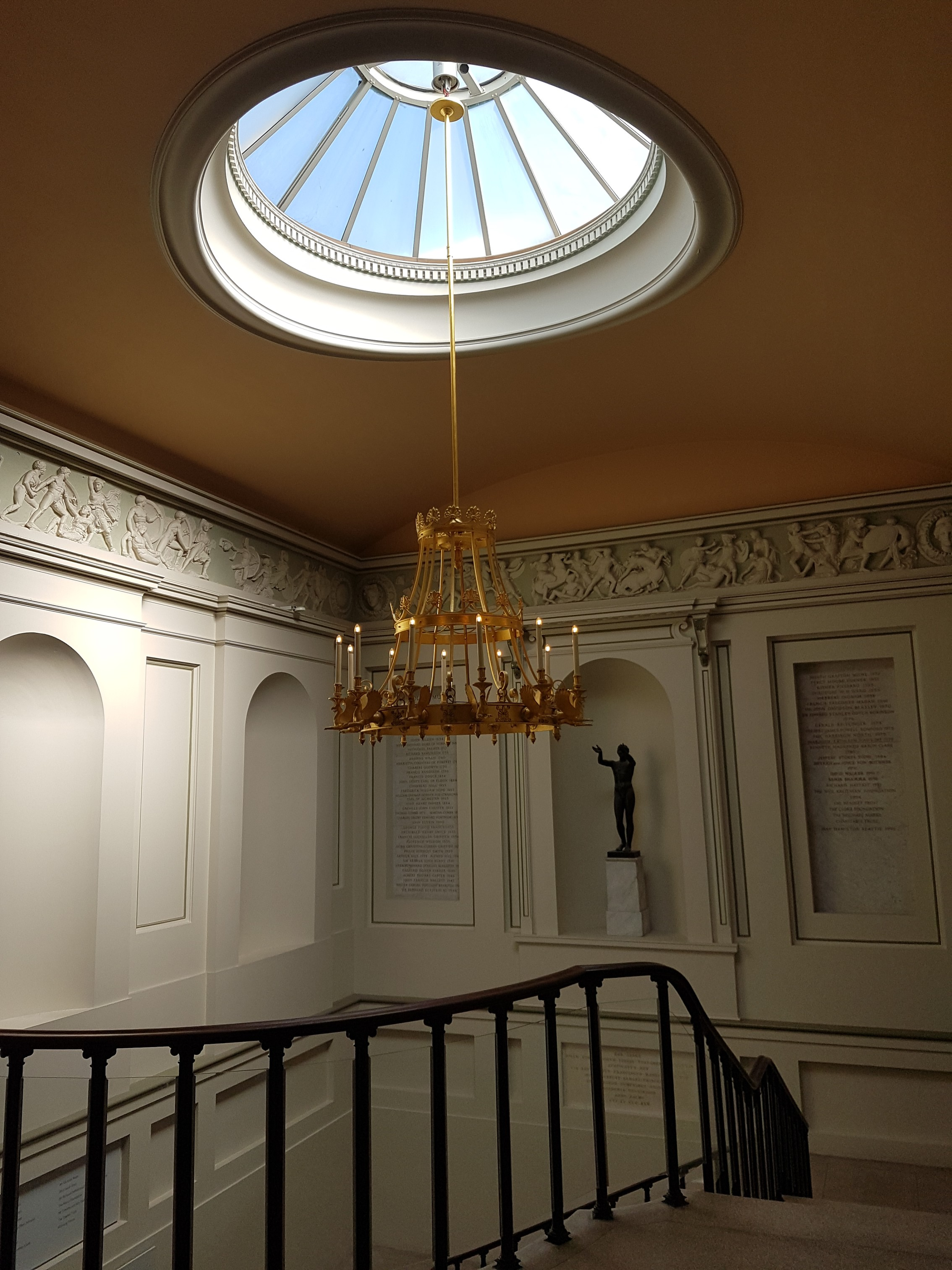
Stairway with skylight

A staircase or stairway is a flight or series of flights of stairs. It is used to connect walkways between floors so that one can move in height. A stairwell is a shaft in a building where a staircase is located. In buildings with several housing units, a stairway can be a necessary common area for getting to and from apartments.

Staircases provide vertical access to connected floors in a multi-story building, and are a functional part of it. Stairwells are often used to place several staircases vertically, one above the other. The entrance to elevators is often located in the stairwell. Sometimes the stairwell goes around the lift shaft, other times it is placed next to it.

A landing platform area is generally provided at both ends of a staircase, rather than having a long series of steps that directly leads to a doorway without a flat area between the steps and the door. Minimum requirements for landing platforms are typically established in building safety codes. The length of a landing platform is generally at least equal to the width of the stairway. If the number of steps is small, a landing area may not be required, but a door would ordinarily not open in the direction that causes it to swing out over a stairway.

An exterior stairway is a stair in a separate structure attached to the rest of the building body, and can either be enclosed or exposed to the elements. Such temporary exposed stairways are sometimes used in conjunction with scaffolding on construction sites, or permanently as an emergency exit.

== History ==
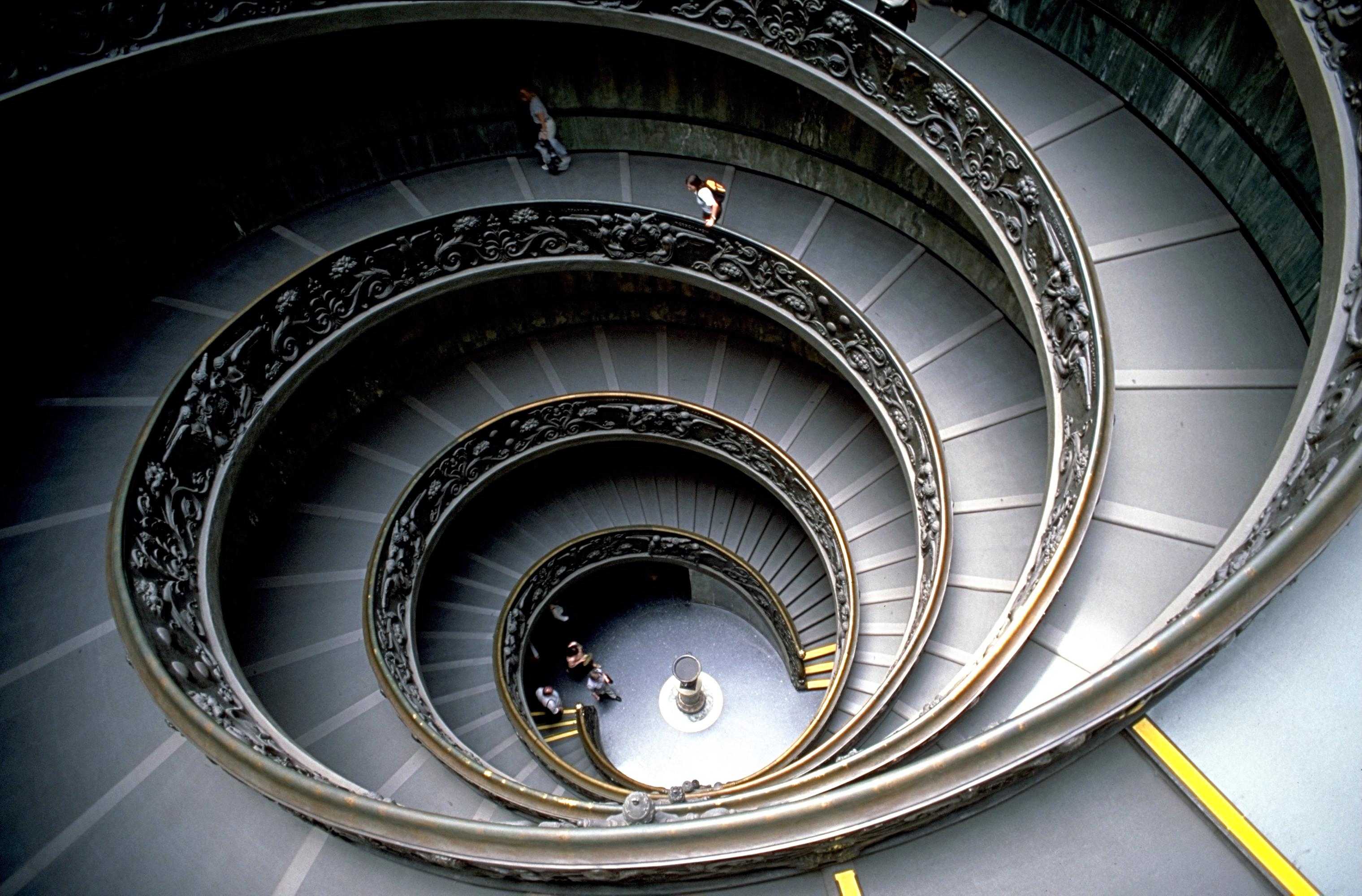
Spiral staircase (double helix) in the Vatican Museums

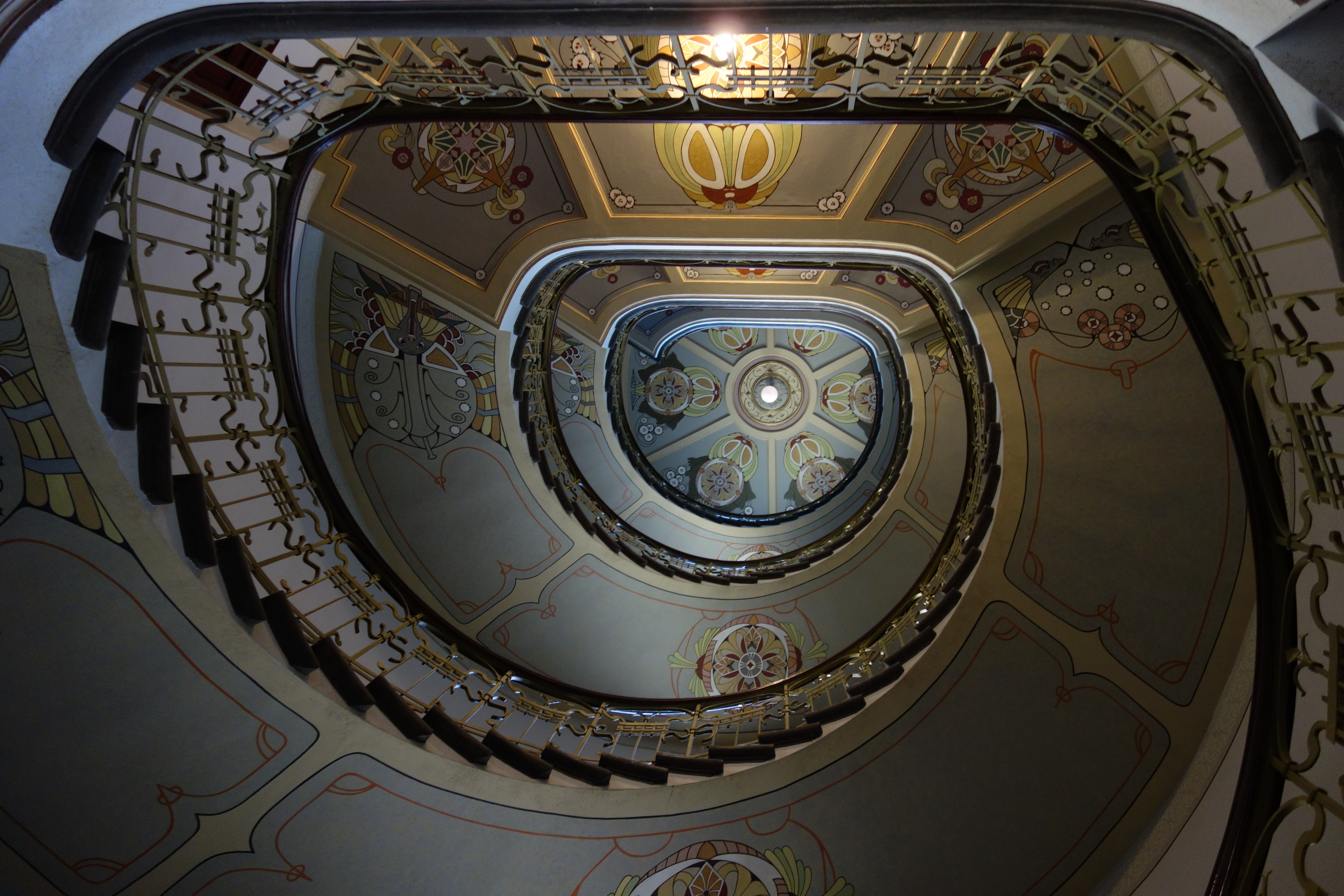
Spiral staircase in Riga (Art Nouveau)

The concept of stairs is believed to be 8000 years old, and are one of the oldest buildings in architectural history. The oldest example of spiral stairs dates back to the 400s BC. Medieval architecture saw experimentation with many different shapes, and the Renaissance even more so with varied designs.

== Lighting ==
Good lighting is important in a staircase so users see where they are going and to prevent falls. There is often a window on the wall to let in daylight. In many cases, indoor stairs are placed far inside the building structure, and it is often not easy to get access to a wall on the outside where it would be natural to have a regular window for letting daylight in. For this reason, it is not unusual to find a skylight or roof windows above a stairwell.

A research article suggests that perceived safety increases when using downwards lighting toward the stairs, while upwards lighting resulted in a substantial decrease of perceived safety.

== Handrail ==
In new stairways, some jurisdictions require handrails to be mounted on both sides. Others may require a handrail only on a side that does not run along a wall.

== Emergency exit ==
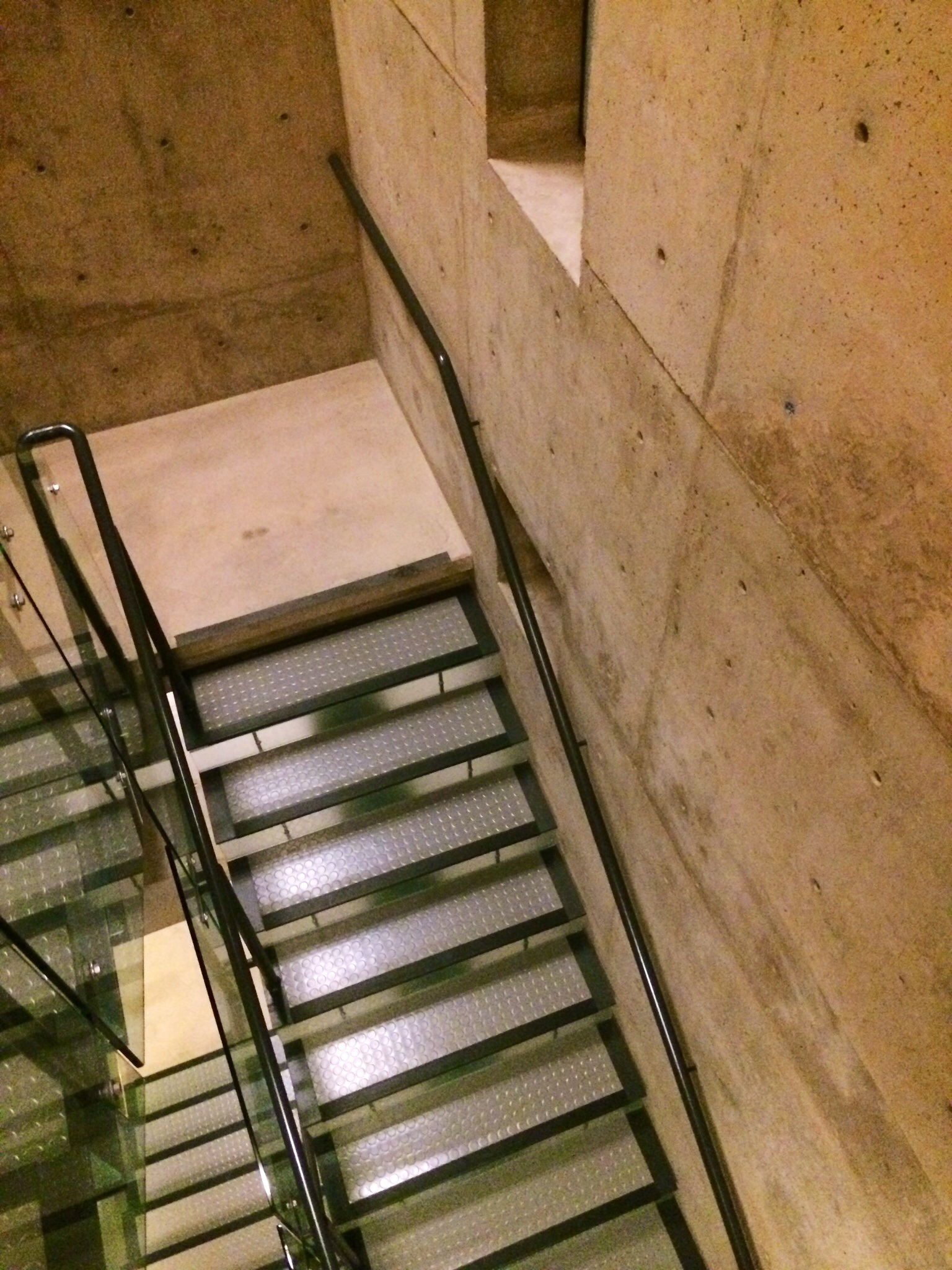
Escape route via stairs with open steps

Often the stairs in a stairwell are an emergency exit in case of fire, and the stairwell should then be a separate fire compartment separated from the rest of the building via fire doors.

For fire safety it can be advantageous that both the walls, ceiling and the stairs themselves in a stairwell are made of non-combustible materials, and be illuminated with daylight during the day and artificial lighting at darkness.

Storage of objects in shared stairwells is generally prohibited due to the fact that this is often an escape route. This applies to both flammable objects and other objects that may become an obstacle to the rescue work. Many housing cooperatives have general prohibitions against storage in common stairwells.

== Utilization ==
Under stairs there is often a lot of area and volume that is not otherwise used. There are several examples of creative uses, such as wardrobes, home offices, playrooms, or general storage such as drawers, cupboards or shelves.

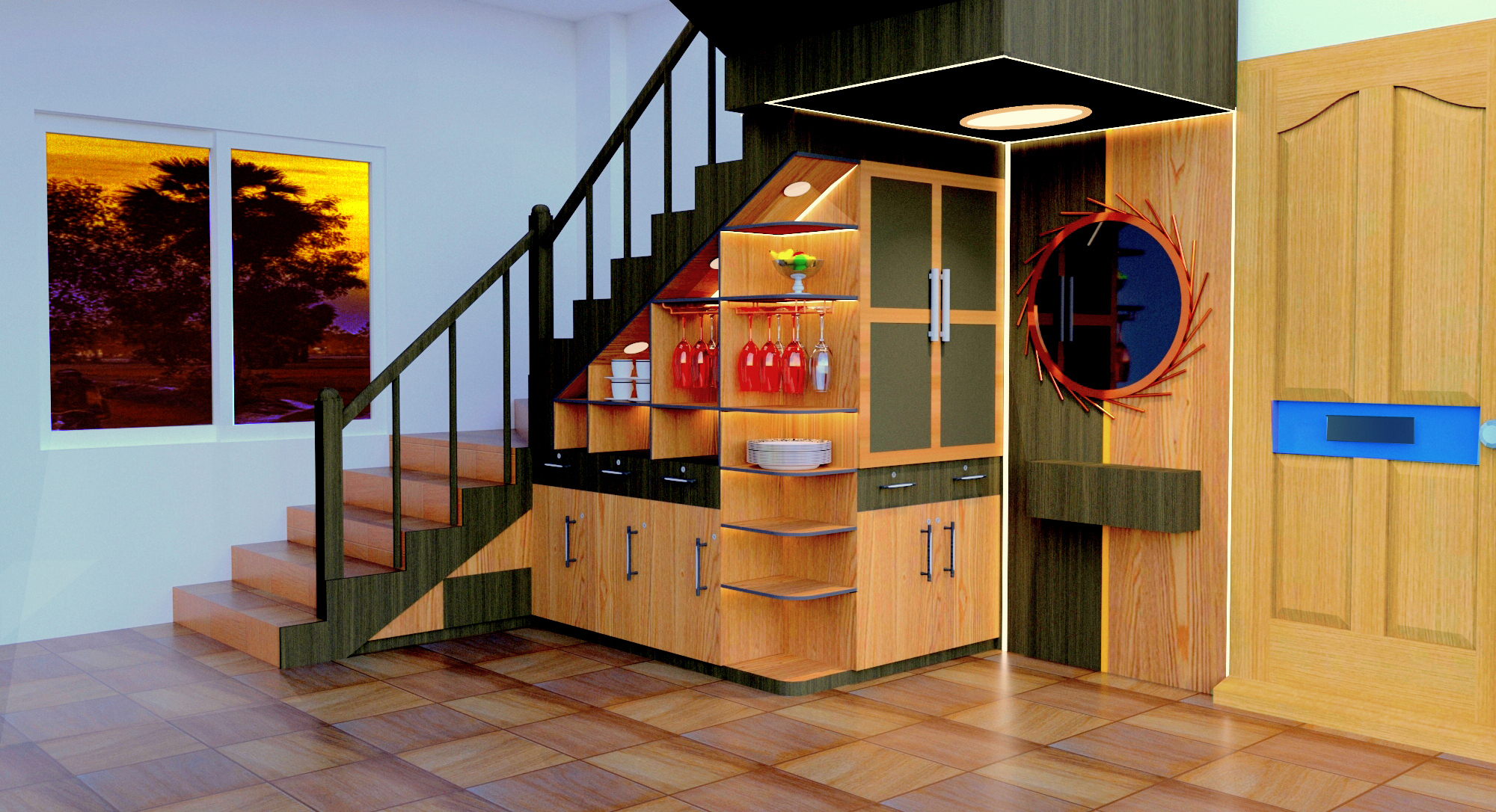
Closet under a staircase

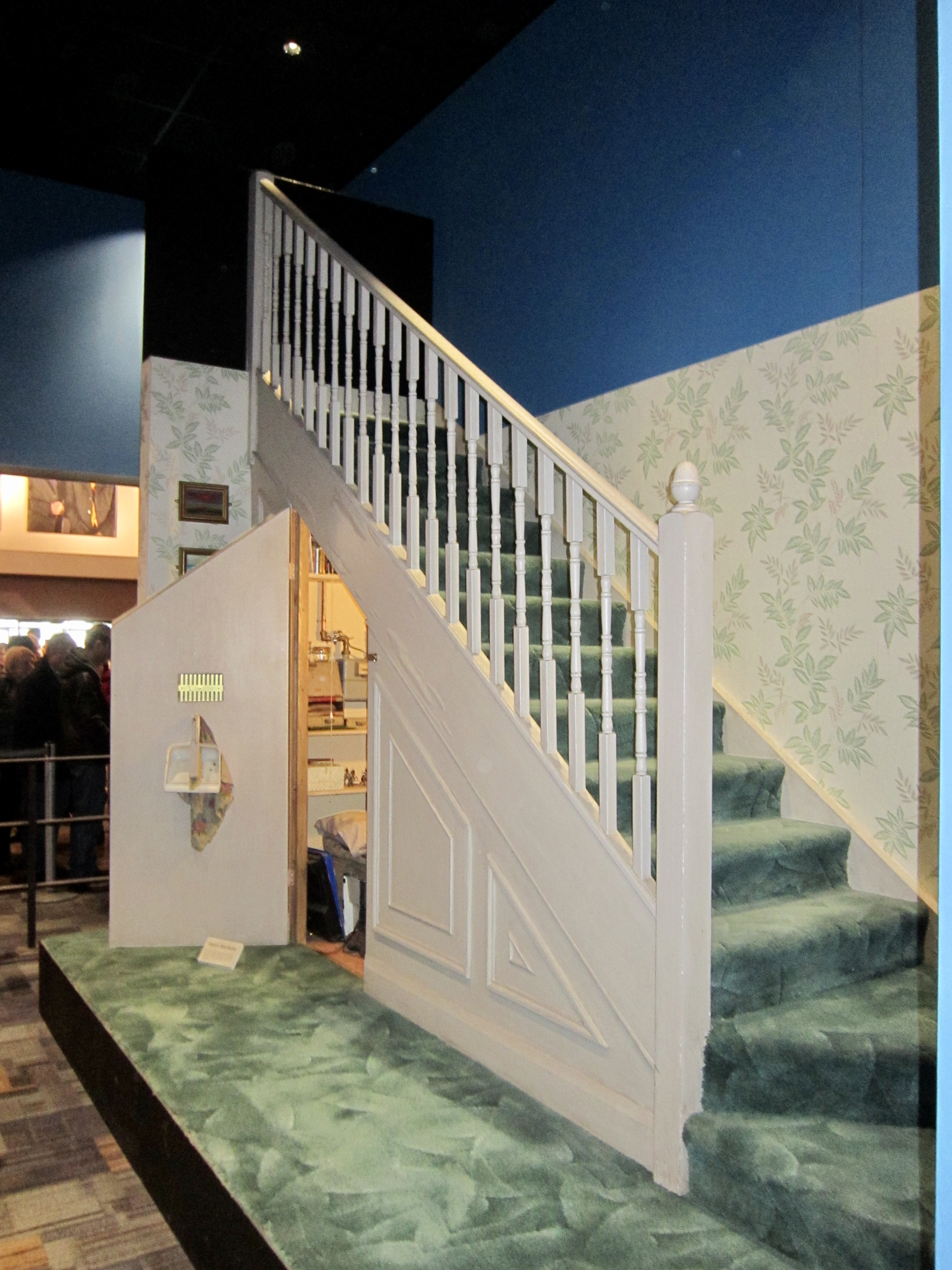
Model of the cupboard under the staircase where the character Harry Potter grew up

== See also ==
- Bicycle stairway
- Emergency exit
- Escalator
- Floor plan
- Stair lift
- Wheelchair ramp
