= Bicycle lift =

Powered mechanical system for moving bicycles uphill

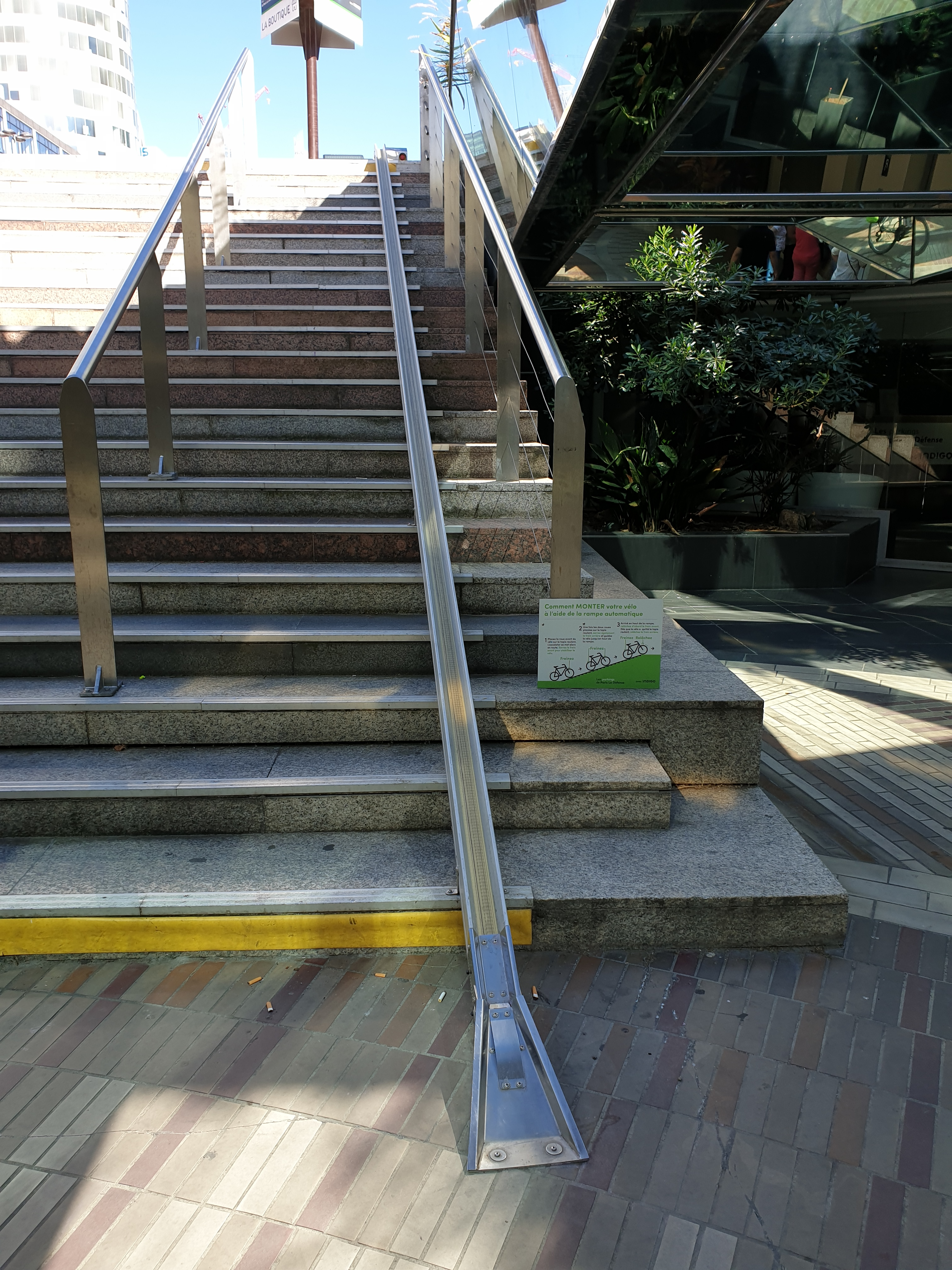
A new powered bike escalator in Paris, 2020

Bicycle lifts are powered mechanical systems for moving bicycles uphill. They are used where the steepness of a slope or other situations like subway crowds make riding uphill difficult.

They are used on transit to make areas more accessible and reduce conflict. Low budgets for bicycle infrastructure are an obstacle to their deployment. They are common in parts of East Asia and Europe.

== Trampe bicycle lift ==
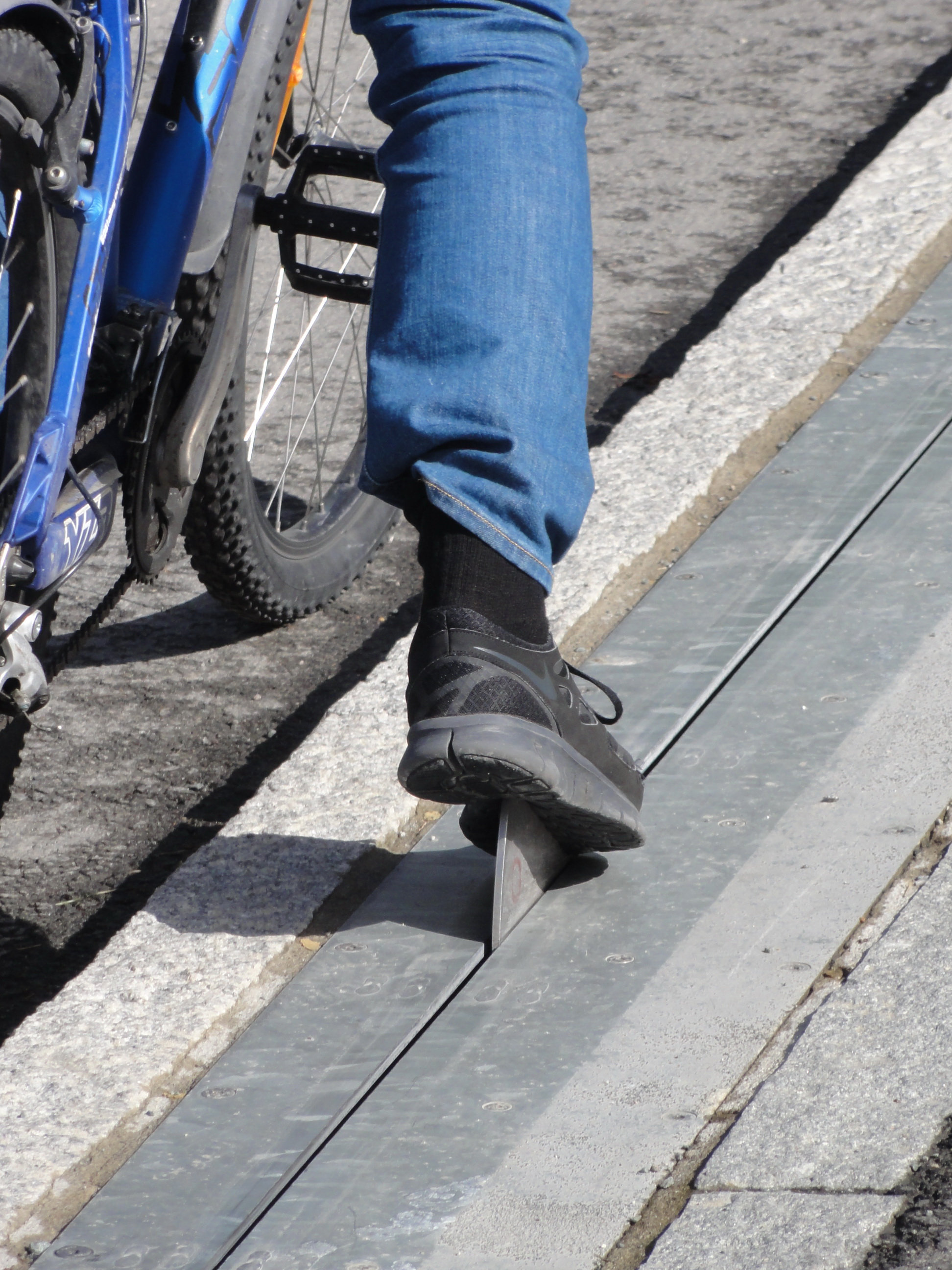
Trampe lift in Trondheim (Norway)

A trampe lift consists of a pedal mounted on a curbside track. The cyclist remains astride their bicycle and puts one foot on the conveyance's pedal, which is attached to a cable within the track. The pedal rises, pushing the bicycle and rider uphill. It also works for kick scooters. This system can be used for ascents of up to 500 metres (1,600 ft).

A trampe lift in Trondheim, Norway, formerly coin-operated, is now free (it starts on a button-press) and has become a major tourist attraction. It pushes cyclists up the steep Brubakken hill. It was built in 1993 by a cyclist who wished to encourage casual cycling. It was rebuilt in 2013 and named the Cyclocable. It is 130m long, and cost 2800 USD per meter to build.

== Bicycle escalator ==
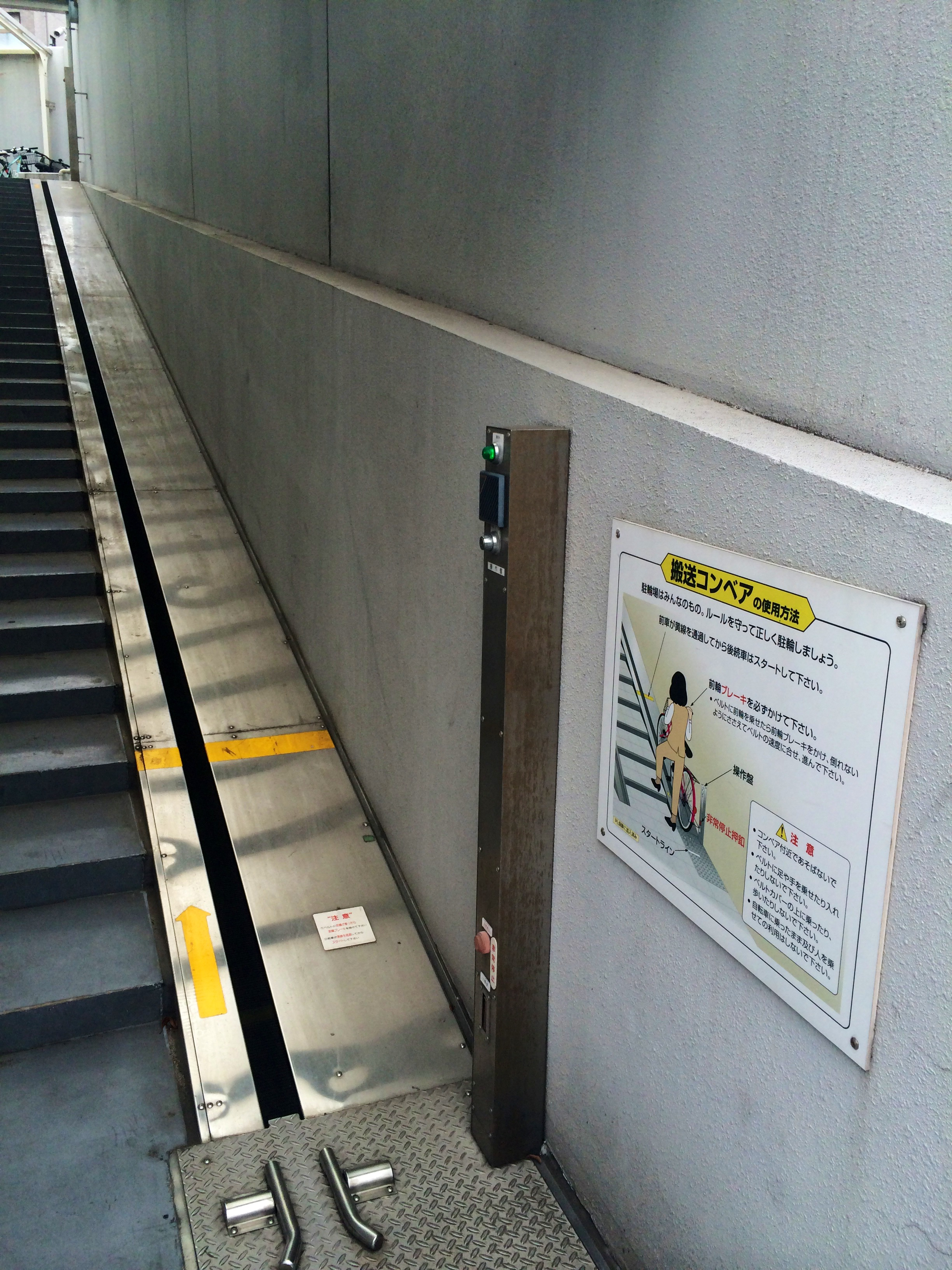
Escalator in Tokyo, showing instructions sign

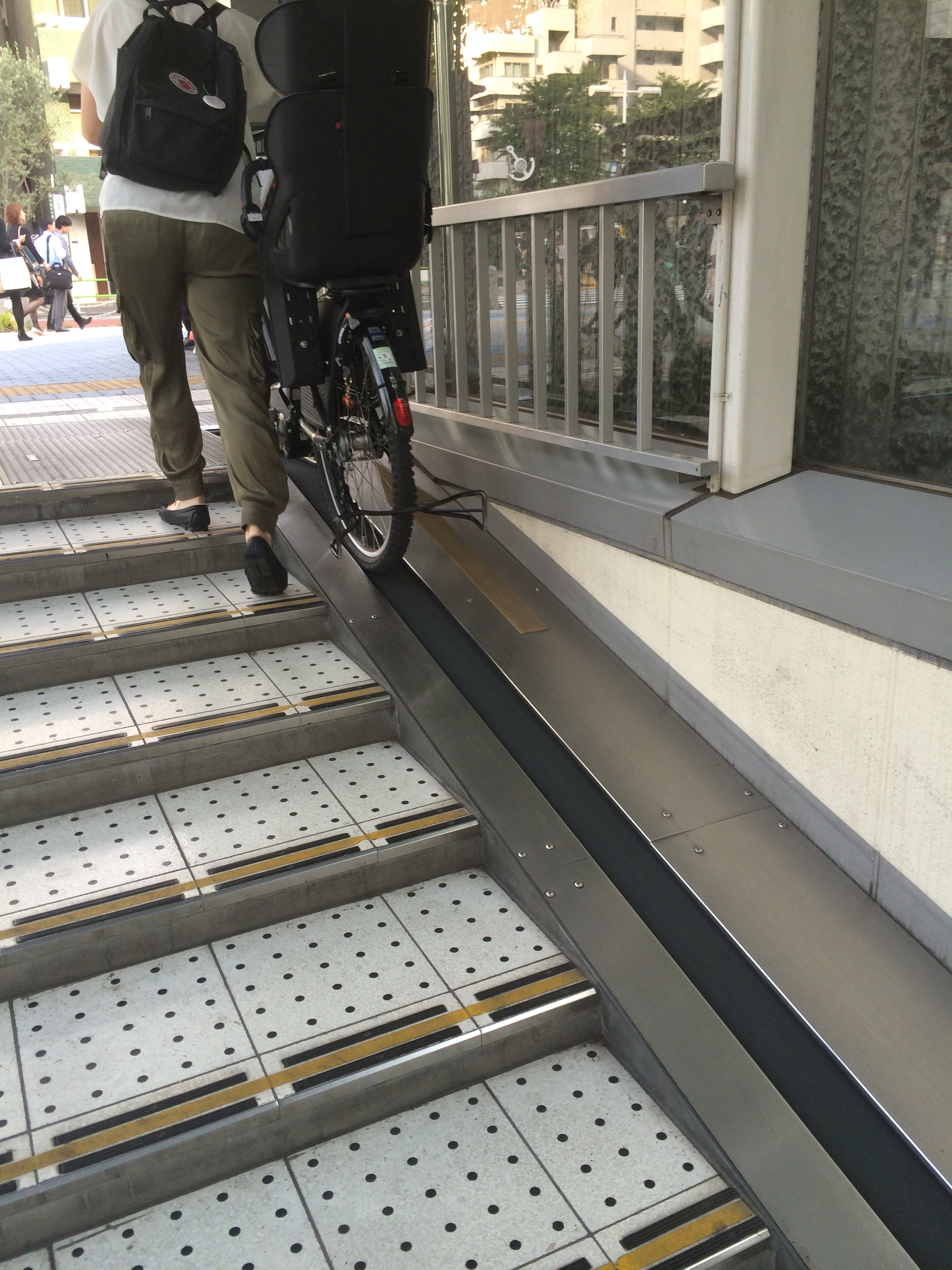
Escalator in Tamachi Station, showing shallower steps

A bike escalator (bike travelator, bike conveyor belt) is a very narrow escalator meant to take the wheels of a bicycle. They are frequently used in subway stations in Japan and South Korea. They run alongside stairs with the cyclist walking beside the bike holding the brakes on. The front brake must be released as the bike leaves the travelator, especially if it immediately has to turn a corner.

They may be made to adapt their speed to the walking pace of the cyclist and take all diameters and widths of bicycle wheels. They may have brushes on the sides to prevent the bicycle from leaving the escalator too quickly and rolling away from the cyclist. They are somewhat harder to use with bicycle without handbrakes (that is, with back-pedal brakes) as the user has to support more of the bicycle's weight.

Apart from being powered, they are similar to bike gutters (also called wheel gutters), U-shaped channels fastened at the sides of stairways, and may be installed to replace them. An upwards escalator may be paired with a downwards unpowered channel lined with brushes.

They are frequently used in subway stations in Japan and South Korea. They are also common in The Netherlands and are used in France.

== Bike tow ==
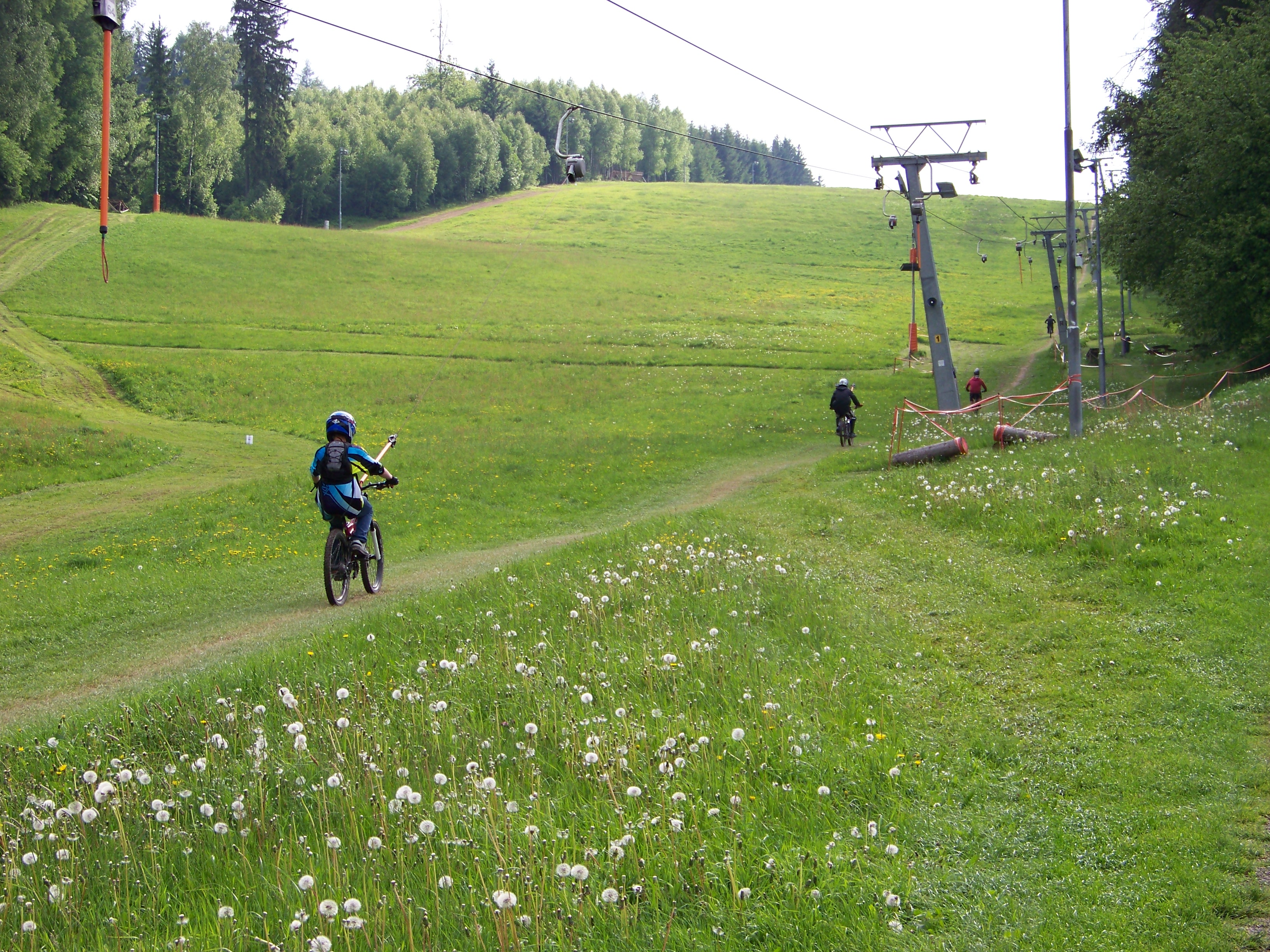
A bike tow, in Česká Třebová-Parník. Unused towline in orange, top left

In a bike tow, bikes are connected to an overhead line. The cyclist stays mounted and rides as the bike is pulled along. The tow lines are retractable (they reel themselves up, like some seatbelts do, when not in use). If not in use, they hang well above head height (except at the ends of the overhead towline, where they are low enough to reach, pull down, and attach to the bike).

== Aerial-lift bike racks ==
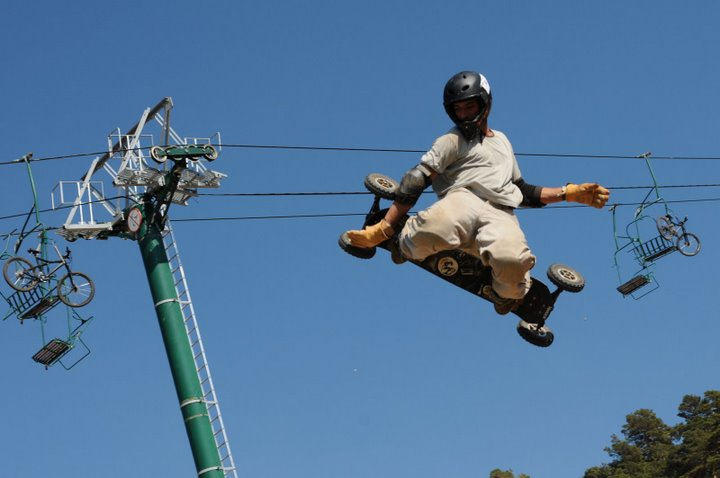
In the absence of aerial-lift bike racks, bikes must be hooked onto an ordinary lift chair (background).

An aerial-lift bike rack is a form of aerial lift designed to lift a bike rack instead of a car or chair. Bikes are loaded at one end and unloaded at the other. They may be used on ski hills for summer mountain biking.

== See also ==
- Bicycle stairway (unpowered version)
- Cycling infrastructure
- Shopping cart conveyor (an escalator for shopping carts)
