= Norwegian Society for Photobiology and Photomedicine =

Norwegian scientific organization

The Norwegian Society for Photobiology and Photomedicine (NOFFOF) was founded at the University Hospital (St Olav's Hospital) in Trondheim, Norway on May 9, 1983. Thirty members enrolled during the first membership year. Since then, membership has varied between 30 and 80.

== Statutes ==
The statutes of the Society prescribe that:

- NOFFOF will seek cooperation across disciplines and can initiate projects on its own initiative
- NOFFOF will inform and educate both the public and the scientific community about photobiology and photomedicine
- NOFFOF membership is open to any individual, institution or company who is associated with the photobiological and photomedical disciplines.

In 2007 the statutes were amended to allow for awarding travel grants to young researchers.

== History and activities ==
A collaboration group for research on ultraviolet (UV) radiation was founded in 1989 and became part of NOFFOF in 1991. The Society then organised two meetings a year; one related to UV topics and one related to general photobiology and photomedicine. Recently, only one ordinary meeting has been arranged per year. A total of more than 35 national and international scientific meetings have been arranged by the Society.

The Society continues to promote educational efforts through teaching and arranging courses and seminars. Many members occasionally teach both undergraduate and graduate level university courses in photobiology. Sometimes scientific meetings are held in conjunction with the teaching of graduate courses on the biological effects of UV and optical radiation.

The Society is pleased to select recipients of the Claude Rimington's Commemorative Prize. Professor Claude Rimington (1902–1993) was a British biochemist who devoted his work to the study of porphyrines and the photosensitization of farm animals. He spent his retirement days continuing his research at the Norwegian Radium Hospital, Oslo. Professor Rimington became an honorary member of NOFFOF in 1984. Since 1995 NOFFOF has awarded the Rimington Prize to ten distinguished researchers in the field of photobiology and photomedicine.

NOFFOF is engaged in international activities, primarily through its association with the International Union of Photobiology (IUPB) and the European Society of Photobiology (ESP). Dr. Kristian Berg, member of NOFFOF since 1989, served as President of ESP in the period 2007 - 2009. The Society was honoured to organise the 9th European Society of Photobiology Congress that took place in Lillehammer, Norway in 2001 (see European Society for Photobiology (ESP) for details).
