= Fjøløy Lighthouse =

Coastal lighthouse in Rennesøy, Norway

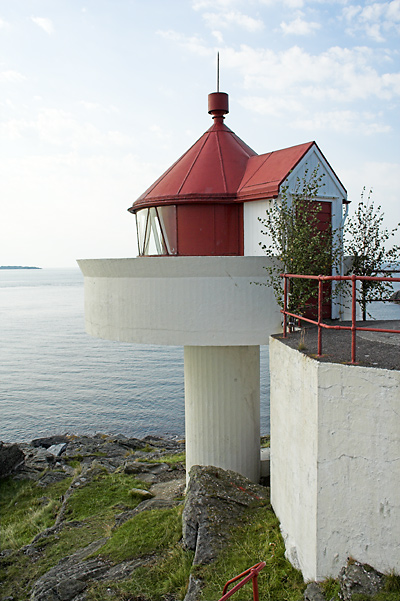
- View of the lighthouse
- Location: Fjøløy, Rennesøy Municipality, Stavanger, Norway
- Coordinates: 59°05′20″N 5°34′08″E

Tower
- Constructed: 1849
- Construction: concrete
- Automated: 1977
- Height: 7 m (23 ft)
- Shape: cylinder
- Markings: White (tower), red (lantern)

Light
- First lit: 1983
- Focal height: 17.5 m (57 ft)
- Intensity: 31,300 candela
- Range: 13.3 nmi (24.6 km; 15.3 mi)
- Characteristic: Oc(2) WRG 8s

The Fjøløy Lighthouse (Norwegian: Fjøløy fyr) is a coastal lighthouse in Stavanger Municipality in Rogaland county, Norway. The lighthouse sits on the island of Fjøløy, along the Boknafjorden. It is owned by the Norwegian Coastal Administration. The lighthouse was first built in 1849, but it has been replaced twice since that time.

== History ==
The lighthouse was established on the island Fjøløy in the old Mosterøy Municipality in 1849. It originally was a relatively small lighthouse that was only active during the season of the herring fisheries. In 1867, the original light was replaced by larger wooden lighthouse. During the occupation of Norway by Nazi Germany the occupants constructed fortifications at the site. That lighthouse was automated in 1977. In 1983, the old, wooden lighthouse was closed down and replaced by a smaller, automated lighthouse on the same site.

== Design ==
The 7-metre (23 ft) tall light sits at an elevation of 17 metres (56 ft) above sea level. It emits a white, red, or green light (depending on direction) that is occulting in groups of two, every eight seconds. The light burns at a 31,300-candela intensity. The lighthouse tower is painted white and the roof is red.

== See also ==
- List of lighthouses in Norway
- Lighthouses in Norway
