= List of shipwrecks in September 1890 =

The list of shipwrecks in September 1890 includes ships sunk, foundered, grounded, or otherwise lost during September 1890.

== 1 September ==
List of shipwrecks: 1 September 1890
Ship	State	Description
Anna Maria	Sweden	The full-rigged ship was abandoned in the Atlantic Ocean 200 nautical miles (370 km) north of Bermuda. She was on a voyage from Mobile, Alabama, United States to Wolgast, Germany.
Lizzie Griffin	United States	The schooner was lost in a severe gale on the Grand Banks of Newfoundland. Her crew survived.
Trevean	United Kingdom	The steamship ran aground in the Danube. She was on a voyage from Brăila, Romania to Gloucester. She was refloated with the assistance of a tug and resumed her voyage.
Vivid	United Kingdom	The brigantine was driven ashore and wrecked at Dungeness, Kent. Her crew were rescued. She was on a voyage from South Shields, County Durham to Teignmouth, Devon.

== 2 September ==
List of shipwrecks: 2 September 1890
Ship	State	Description
Corrbedo	United Kingdom	The steamship was lost off the Spanish coast.
Escurial	United Kingdom	The steamship was driven ashore at Cape Paga, Greece. She was on a voyage from Catacolo to Patras, Greece.
Lion	United Kingdom	The schooner was aban doned in the Atlantic Ocean. She was on a voyage from Lunenburg, Nova Scotia, Canada to Jamaica.
Majestic	United Kingdom	The steamship caught fire at New York, United States.
Ria	United Kingdom	The steam launch was driven ashore at Whitehead, County Antrim. She was on a voyage from Belfast to Islandmage, County Antrim. She was refloated with assistance from the Coast Guard and taken in to Chichester Cove in a leaky condition.
Sailor	United Kingdom	The tug sank at South Shields, County Durham. She was refloated and beached.
Umzinto	United Kingdom	The barque sprang a leak and foundered off the Maldive Islands and 300 nautical miles (560 km) off Colombo, Ceylon. Her crew survived. She was on a voyage from Kurrachee, India to Mauritius.
Unto	Norway	The barque was driven ashore and wrecked at Paspébiac, Quebec, Canada. She was on a voyage from Dalhousie, New Brunswick, Canada to Swansea, Glamorgan, United Kingdom.
Unnamed	United States	The barge was run into by the steamship Bendo (United Kingdom) and sank at Fortress Monroe, Virginia.

== 3 September ==
List of shipwrecks: 3 September 1890
Ship	State	Description
Alster	Sweden	The brigantine collided with the steamship Auckland Castle (United Kingdom) in the Baltic Sea and was severely damaged. Alster was on a voyage from Stettin, Germany to Hudiksvall. She put in to Kalmar.
Canton	United Kingdom	The schooner was driven ashore near "Gjellerodde", Norway. She was refloated with the assistance of a steamship and taken in to Lemvig.
Coningsby	United Kingdom	The steamship ran aground on the Corrubedo Rocks, on the north coast of Spain. Her crew were rescued. She was on a voyage from Berdianski, Russia to West Hartlepool, County Durham. She was refloated in mid-October.
Gleaner	United Kingdom	The schooner struck the wreck of the steamship Verité (France) at Mogador, Morocco and was damaged.
Neptun	Germany	The ship ran aground in the Nordzee Kanaal. She was on a voyage from Archangelsk, Russia to Zaandam, North Holland, Netherlands.
Pactolus	United Kingdom	The ship ran aground in the River Parrett. She was on a voyage from Gävle, Sweden to Appledore, Devon.
Reichstag	Germany	The steamship was driven ashore at Dar es Salaam, German East Africa. She was refloated on 10 September.

== 4 September ==
List of shipwrecks: 4 September 1890
Ship	State	Description
Birch	United Kingdom	The steamship was driven ashore at Sabina Point, Spain. She was on a voyage from South Shields, County Durham to Pompeii, Italy. She was refloated on 6 September and resumed her voyage.
Coningsby	United Kingdom	The steamship ran aground on the Carrebedo Sand, off the coast of Spain. She was refloated in mid-October.
Cygnet	United Kingdom	The tug sank at Skinnerburn-on-Tyne, Northumberland.
Niels Koren	Norway	The ship collided with a bridge at South Shields, County Durham, United Kingdom and was severely damaged. She was on a voyage from Egersund to South Shields. She was beached.
Tigre	France	The steamship was driven onto the Villez Martin Rocks, on the coast of Loire-Inférieure. She was on a voyage from Batoum, Russia to Havre de Grâce, Seine-Inférieure. She was refloated on 10 September and taken in to Saint-Nazaire, Loire-Inférieure.

== 5 September ==
List of shipwrecks: 5 September 1890
Ship	State	Description
Activ	Sweden	The jagt was driven ashore at Korsør, Denmark. She was on a voyage from Karlshamn to Odense, Denmark. She was refloated with the assistance of a steamship and taken in to Korsør.
Aston	United Kingdom	The steamship was driven ashore at Ballyquinton Point, County Down. She was refloated.
Grecian	United Kingdom	The steamship was severely damaged by fire at Quebec, Canada.
Lynx	United Kingdom	The steamship was run into by the steamship Oevelconne (Germany) in the English Channel 15 nautical miles (28 km) south west by west of Portland, Dorset and was damaged. Lynx was on a voyage from Jersey, Channel Islands to Weymouth, Dorset.

== 6 September ==
List of shipwrecks: 6 September 1890
Ship	State	Description
Countess of Ellesmere	United Kingdom	The Mersey flat was run into by the steamship Hesperides (United Kingdom) and sank at Liverpool, Lancashire.
Harrogate	United Kingdom	The steamship ran aground in the River Foyle. She was refloated on 8 September and taken in to Londonderry.
Honfleur	United Kingdom	The steamship ran aground at Foreland, Isle of Wight. She was on a voyage from Cherbourg, Seine-Inférieure, France to Southampton, Hampshire. She was refloated and completed her voyage.
Royal Crown	United Kingdom	The steamship struck a sunken wreck and foundered 3 nautical miles (5.6 km) south of Ouessant, Finistère, France. All 31 people on board were rescued. She was on a voyage from Fiume, Austria-Hungary to Leith, Lothian.
Telemachus	Romania	The lighter ran aground in the Danube 7 nautical miles (13 km) from Giurgevo.

== 7 September ==
List of shipwrecks: 7 September 1890
Ship	State	Description
Adèle et Georgée	France	The ship was wrecked at Saint Pierre, Saint Pierre and Miquelon. Her crew survived.
Elvira Ardisson	Italy	The brigantine collided with the steamship Bellender (United Kingdom) and sank in the Bay of Biscay 120 nautical miles (220 km) off the Isles of Scilly, United Kingdom with the loss of four of her twelve crew. Survivors were rescued by Bellenden. Elvira Ardisson was on a voyage from Cardiff, Glamorgan, United Kingdom to Fray Bentos, Uruguay.

== 8 September ==
List of shipwrecks: 8 September 1890
Ship	State	Description
Amazon	United Kingdom	The fishing trawler was destroyed by fire in the North Sea off Yorkshire. Her crew were rescued by a steamship.
Il Campidoglio	Italy	The brig was abandoned in the Atlantic Ocean. She was on a voyage from Rio de Janeiro, Brazil to an American port.
J. W. Holmes	United Kingdom	The barque was driven ashore in the Bay of Fundy. She was on a voyage from Hantsport, Nova Scotia, Canada to Savannah, Georgia, United States. She was refloated and beached at Parrsboro, Nova Scotia for examination.
Meteor	United Kingdom	The steamship collided with the barge George and Hetty (United Kingdom) and sank at Wapping, London.

== 9 September ==
List of shipwrecks: 9 September 1890
Ship	State	Description
Argero Christoforos, and Grassimos	Romania	The lighters ran aground in the Danube at "Karadassi" and collided with each other.
Beresford	United Kingdom	The steamship ran aground in the Danube 30 nautical miles (56 km) from its mouth. She was refloated on 11 September.
Ida	Denmark	The brig was towed in to Helsinki, Grand Duchy of Finland in a capsized condition.
Mary	United Kingdom	The barque was run down and sunk in the Clyde by the steamship Minerva (United Kingdom) with the loss of two of her crew.
Mavis	United Kingdom	The paddle steamer was driven ashore on the Long Nose Rock, Margate, Kent. She was on a voyage from Ramsgate to Margate. She was refloated and put back to Ramsgate.
Mignon	United States	The steam yacht ran aground at Cape Fear, North Carolina and was wrecked. Her crew were rescued. She was on a voyage from New York to Savannah, Georgia.
Olaf	United Kingdom	The steamship collided with Imperator Aleksandr II (Imperial Russian Navy) in the Baltic Sea and was damaged. Olaf put in to Cronstadt, Russia.
William Connal	United Kingdom	The steamship ran aground in the River Avon. She was on a voyage from Nantes, Loire-Inférieure, France to Bristol, Gloucestershire. She was refloated and taken in to the Kingroad.

== 10 September ==
List of shipwrecks: 10 September 1890
Ship	State	Description
Caedmon	United Kingdom	The steamship caught fire at Berdianski, Russia.
Cairngorm	United Kingdom	The steamship ran aground on the Bungar Bank, in Sligo Bay. She was on a voyage from Ayr to Sligo.
Karl Hindric	Sweden	The full-rigged ship collided with the steamship Hellopes (United Kingdom) at Montevideo, Uruguay and was severely damaged.
Cathcart	United Kingdom	The ship was driven ashore at Jervis Bay, New South Wales. She was refloated with the assistance of two tugs.
Celt	United Kingdom	The steamship ran aground in the Seine at La Bouille, Seine-Inférieure, France. She was on a voyage from Newcastle upon Tyne, Northumberland to Rouen, Seine-Inférieure.
Firefly	United Kingdom	The steamship was driven ashore on Vlieland, Friesland, Netherlands. She was on a voyage from Hamburg, Germany to Amsterdam, North Holland, Netherlands.
Halcyon	United States	The schooner was driven ashore and wrecked at Yokohama, Japan.
Johanna	(Russian Empire) Grand Duchy of Finland	The schooner was lost in the Baltic Sea with the loss of a crew member. Survivors were rescued by the barque Hebe (Norway).
Kinghorn	United Kingdom	The steamship ran aground in the Nordzee Kanaal. She was on a voyage from Amsterdam to Leith, Lothian. She was refloated the next day and resumed her voyage.
Mary	United Kingdom	The smack collided with the steamship Minerva (United Kingdom) and sank in the Clyde with the loss of two of her crew.
Tai Cheong	Flag unknown	The steamship was driven ashore near Saigon, French Indo-China.

== 11 September ==
List of shipwrecks: 11 September 1890
Ship	State	Description
Anna Margaretha	Germany	The schooner sprang a leak at Leith, Lothian, United Kingdom and was beached.
Ashdale	United Kingdom	The collier sprang a leak and foundered in the Bristol Channel 17 nautical miles (31 km) west of Lundy Island, Devon. Her eleven crew survived. She was on a voyage from Cardiff, Glamorgan to Tralee, County Kerry.
Carl Hindric	Sweden	The ship collided with the steamship Hellopes (United Kingdom) at Montevideo, Uruguay and was severely damaged.
Chirton	United Kingdom	The steamship was driven ashore on Saltholmen, Denmark. She was on a voyage from Cronstadt, Russia to London. She was refloated and resumed her voyage.
Nettie	United States	The brig was severely damaged by fire at Lyttleton, New Zealand.
Opobo	United Kingdom	The steamship was driven ashore at "Bottomless Pit", on the west coast of Africa near Grand-Bassam, Ivory Coast.
Red Jacket	United Kingdom	The steamship ran aground in the Nieuwe Waterweg. She was refloated.
Statira	United Kingdom	The steamship ran aground at Sunderland, County Durham. She was on a voyage from Riga, Russia to Sunderland. She was refloated with the assistance of a tug.
Syra	United Kingdom	The steamship ran aground on Saltholmen. She was on a voyage from Sundsvall, Sweden to Dieppe, Seine-Inférieure, France. She was refloated with assistance.
Unnamed	United Kingdom	The Mersey flat was run into by the steamship Dungonnell (United Kingdom) and sank in the River Mersey.

== 12 September ==
List of shipwrecks: 12 September 1890
Ship	State	Description
Amy	United Kingdom	The steamship ran aground on the Scarr Rock, Whitby, Yorkshire and was wrecked. She was on a voyage from the River Tyne to Calais, France.
Helmath	Germany	The ship was abandoned in the North Sea. Her crew were rescued by the steamship Lolland (Denmark). Helmath was on a voyage from Grimstad, Norway to Brake.
Waterwitch	United Kingdom	The barque foundered in the Atlantic Ocean with the loss of at least ten of her crew, according to a message in a bottle that washed ashore at Marblehead, Massachusetts, United States on 26 November.

== 13 September ==
List of shipwrecks: 13 September 1890
Ship	State	Description
Electra	United Kingdom	The steamship ran aground at Honfleur, Manche, France. She was refloated and found to have a slight leak.
Genus	Flag unknown	The steamship was driven ashore at Palermo, Sicily, Italy. She was refloated and put in to Palermo.
Maria Adelaide	United States	The schooner was driven ashore and wrecked on Cuttyhunk Island, Massachusetts. She was on a voyage from Bridgeport, Connecticut to Bangor, Maine.
Strathyre	United Kingdom	The steamship came ashore on Nevis. She had previously been abandoned at sea. Her crew had been rescued. She was later refloated.

== 14 September ==
List of shipwrecks: 14 September 1890
Ship	State	Description
Adolphe Thiers	France	The barque was driven ashore and wrecked at Santa Rosalía, Mexico. She was on a voyage from Santa Rosalía to Corinto.
George Blohm	Germany	The barque was wrecked at Atalaia, Brazil. Her crew were rescued.

== 15 September ==
List of shipwrecks: 15 September 1890
Ship	State	Description
Barcelona	United Kingdom	The steamship was driven ashore on Red Island, Newfoundland Colony. She was on a voyage from Middlesbrough, Yorkshire to Quebec, Canada. She was refloated in late October and taken in to Quebec.
Cachar	United Kingdom	The steamship ran aground in the Nieuwe Waterweg. She was on a voyage from Iquique Peru to Rotterdam, South Holland, Netherlands. She was refloated.
Drenthe	United Kingdom	The steamship ran aground in the Nieuwe Waterweg. She was on a voyage from Java, Netherlands East Indies to Rotterdam.
Glen Grant	United Kingdom	The ship was driven ashore at Longhope, Orkney Islands. She was on a voyage from Quebec, Canada to Newcastle upon Tyne, Northumberland. She was later refloated and towed to the River Tyne.
Moldavas	Flag unknown	The ship was driven ashore at Seraglio Point, Ottoman Empire. She was refloated.
Nora Wiggins	Canada	The ship ran aground at Coleraine, County Londonderry, United Kingdom. She was on a voyage from Philadelphia, Pennsylvania, United States to Coleraine.
Somerhill	United Kingdom	The steamship was driven ashore on Barren Island, in Chesapeake Bay. She was on a voyage from Baltimore, Maryland to Saint Thomas, Virgin Islands. She was refloated and resumed her voyage.
Spaarndam	Netherlands	The steamship ran aground in the Nieuwe Waterweg. She was on a voyage from Rotterdam to New York, United States. She was later refloated with assistance and resumed her voyage.
Tropic	United Kingdom	The steamship ran aground on the Ackbourun Reef, in the Black Sea.

== 16 September ==
List of shipwrecks: 16 September 1890
Ship	State	Description
SMS Taurus	Austro-Hungarian Navy	The warship sank in the Black Sea with the loss of all seventy-three people on board.
Yorinobu Maru	Japan	The barquentine was driven ashore and wrecked on Tishina Island. She was on a voyage from Shimonoseki to Kobe.

== 17 September ==
List of shipwrecks: 17 September 1890
Ship	State	Description
Minna	United Kingdom	The barquentine was wrecked near Maranhão, Brazil. She was on a voyage from Cardiff, Glamorgan to Maranhão.
Sleipner	Sweden	The barque collided with the barque Gers (France) in the English Channel 20 nautical miles (37 km) west of Portland, Dorset, United Kingdom and was severely damaged. Sleipner was on a voyage from Santiago, Chile to Tvedestrand. She was towed in to Portland by the tug Albert Victor (United Kingdom).
Strathearn	United Kingdom	The steamship departed from Nagasaki, Japan for San Francisco, California. No further trace, reported missing.

== 18 September ==
List of shipwrecks: 18 September 1890
Ship	State	Description
Ertuğrul	Ottoman Navy	The sailing frigate was wrecked on Oshima Island off Wakayama Prefecture, Japan, with the loss of 533 crew.
Eugenia	United Kingdom	The ship ran aground in the River Thames at Erith, Kent.
Howards	United Kingdom	The steamship ran aground in the Meijen River, Russia. She was on a voyage from "Mesane" to Saint Petersburg, Russia.
Maria Brockelmann	United Kingdom	The collier, a brig, collided with the steamship Colina (United Kingdom) and sank off the Bull Point Lighthouse, Devon with the loss of four of her seven crew. Survivors were rescued by Colina. Maria Brockelmann was on a voyage from Cardiff, Glamorgan to Drogheda, County Louth.
Musashi Maru	Japan	The steamship was wrecked at Kōchi with the loss of all bar one of her crew.
Strathearn	United Kingdom	The steamship departed from Nagasaki, Japan for San Francisco, California, United States. No further trace, presumed foundered with the loss of all 27 crew.
Vine	United Kingdom	The schooner ran aground in the River Thames at Barking, Essex. She was refloated and found to be severely leaky.

== 19 September ==
List of shipwrecks: 19 September 1890
Ship	State	Description
Aghios Spirithionos	Ottoman Empire	The ship was wrecked at Roysolamo, near Bourgas, Romania. She was on a voyage from Galaţi, Romania to Smyrna, Russia.
Express, and Niobe	United Kingdom	The steamships collided at Garston, Lancashire and were both severely damaged.
Princess Beatrice	United Kingdom	The steamship was driven ashore at New Harbour, Nova Scotia, Canada. She was on a voyage from Halifax, Nova Scotia to Charlottetown, Prince Edward Island, Canada.
San Marco	United Kingdom	The steamship was driven ashore at San Stefano, Ottoman Empire.

== 20 September ==
List of shipwrecks: 20 September 1890
Ship	State	Description
Beecroft	United Kingdom	The ship was driven ashore in "Ruaness Bay", Sanday, Orkney Islands. She was on a voyage from Gävle, Sweden to Melbourne Victoria. She was refloated on 28 September and towed in to Kirkwall.
Dawn	United Kingdom	The yacht was driven ashore and wrecked at Plymouth, Devon.
Emanuel	Norway	The schooner caught fire at Copenhagen, Denmark. She was on a voyage from Stettin, Germany to Bordeaux, Gironde, France.
Maria Repetto	Italy	The barque ran aground near Spike Island, County Cork, United Kingdom. She was on a voyage from Tabarka, Tunisia to Queenstown, County Cork. She was refloated with assistance and sailed for Cork.
Muley Hassan	Spain	The steamship was wrecked on the Accitera Reef, off Cape Trafalgar. Her crew were rescued.

== 21 September ==
List of shipwrecks: 21 September 1890
Ship	State	Description
Argo	Netherlands	The schooner was driven ashore and wrecked at "Lildstrand", Denmark. She was on a voyage from Libau. Russia to Harlingen, Friesland.
Blondine	France	The brigantine was wrecked on rocks off "Teignouse". She was on a voyage from Bilbao, Spain to Caen, Calvados.
Ella	United Kingdom	The yacht was driven ashore and wrecked at Port Ellen, Argyllshire.
Fountains Abbey	United Kingdom	The steamship was driven ashore at "Stubben", Denmark. She was on a voyage from Hudiksvall or Sundsvall, Sweden to Bordeaux, Gironde, France. She was later refloated and taken in to Copenhagen.
Harrogate	United Kingdom	The steamship was severely damaged by fire at Cardiff, Glamorgan.
Herman	Norway	The brigatine was abandoned in the Atlantic Ocean. She was on a voyage from Cardiff to the Rio Grande.
Mona	United Kingdom	The steamship caught fire and sprang a severe leak in the North Sea. She was on a voyage from Amble, Northumberland to Rochester, Kent. She put in to Great Yarmouth, Norfolk. The fire was extinguished.

== 22 September ==
List of shipwrecks: 22 September 1890
Ship	State	Description
Astrea	Flag unknown	The steamship was driven ashore at Aqmescit, Russia.
Atlanta	Sweden	The derelict schooner was towed in to Milford Haven, Pembrokeshire, United Kingdom by the steam trawler Majesty (United Kingdom).
Blue Grit	United Kingdom	The smack foundered in the Irish Sea off the coast of County Waterford with the loss of all hands.
Delphin	Norway	The brig was wrecked at Umeå Sweden.
Delta	United Kingdom	The steamship collided with the steamships Lady Martin and SS North Wall (1883) (both United Kingdom) at Ringsend, County Dublin and was beached.
Fekeline	Germany	The schooner foundered in the Atlantic Ocean. Her crew were rescued by Bactria (United Kingdom). Fekeline was on a voyage from Larache, Morocco to Irvine, Ayrshire, United Kingdom.
Ida	Sweden	The barque ran aground on the Middelgrunden, off Copenhagen, Denmark. She was on a voyage from Härnösand to Grimsby, Lincolnshire, United Kingdom. She was refloated and resumed her voyage.
Lizzie C. Troop	United Kingdom	The ship was wrecked in the Loochoo Island, Japan with the loss of twelve of the 21 people on board. She was on a voyage from Nagasaki, Japan to the Puget Sound.
Margaret Reid	United Kingdom	The schooner caught fire at Dundee, Forfarshire. She was on a voyage from Lindisfarne, Northumberland to Dundee. The fire was extinguished.
Mercutio	United Kingdom	The steamship ran aground near Copenhagen. She was on a voyage from Riga, Russia to Middlesbrough, Yorkshire.
Robert Eggleton	United Kingdom	The steamship ran aground on the Longsand, in the North Sea off the coast of Essex. She was on a voyage from Odessa, Russia to London.
William Stephenson	Norway	The barque was abandoned in the Atlantic Ocean 300 nautical miles (560 km) west of Cape Clear Island, County Cork. Her thirteen crew were rescued by the barque Draupner (Norway). Wiliam Stephenson was on a voyage from Quebec, Canada to Belfast, County Antrim, United Kingdom.

== 23 September ==
List of shipwrecks: 23 September 1890
Ship	State	Description
I. A. Johnson	United States	The two-masted scow schooner sank in 93 feet (28 m) of water in Lake Michigan off Centerville, Wisconsin, 8 miles (13 km) north of Sheboygan, Wisconsin, at 43.892163°N 087.651535°W after colliding with the schooner Lincoln Dall (United States) off the mouth of the Black River just south of Sheboygan. Lincoln Dall rescued her five-man crew. The wreck was included in the Wisconsin Shipwreck Coast National Marine Sanctuary in 2021.

== 24 September ==
List of shipwrecks: 24 September 1890
Ship	State	Description
Damara	United Kingdom	The steamship collided with the steamship Musgrave in the River Thames and was beached. Damara was on a voyage from Halifax, Nova Scotia, Canada to London. She was refloated the next day and resumed her voyage.
Dina	Norway	The ship was driven ashore at Colmar, Sweden. She was refloated in mid-October.
Paranagua	Germany	The steamship was run into by the steamship Orion (Austria-Hungary) at Rio de Janeiro, Brazil and sank at the stern.

== 25 September ==
List of shipwrecks: 25 September 1890
Ship	State	Description
Coleridge	United Kingdom	The steamship ran aground at "Tjilholmssundet", Sweden.
Denton Holme	United Kingdom	The full-rigged ship was wrecked on Rottnest Island, Western Australia. She was on a voyage from Glasgow, Renfrewshire to Fremantle, Western Australia.
Drafna	Norway	The barque was abandoned in the Atlantic Ocean. All ten people aboard were rescued by the steamship Dronning Louisa (Norway). Drafna was on a voyage from Pugwash, Nova Scotia, Canada to Liverpool.
Fiskeren	Norway	The steamship was driven ashore and wrecked at the Stabben Lighthouse, Florø. She was on a voyage from Bergen to Vesterålen.
Orvar Odd	Norway	The barque ran aground on the Middelgrunden. She was on a voyage from Vestervik, Sweden to Rio de Janeiro, Brazil.

== 26 September ==
List of shipwrecks: 26 September 1890
Ship	State	Description
Black Jetty	United Kingdom	The ship was run into by the barque Benares (United Kingdom) at South Shields, County Durham and was severely damaged.
Wieland	United Kingdom	The steamship ran aground at New York, United States. She was refloated.

== 27 September ==
List of shipwrecks: 27 September 1890
Ship	State	Description
Africa	Portugal	The barque was wrecked at Macau. Her crew survived. She was on a voyage from Rio de Janeiro, Brazil to Macau.
Elsa	United Kingdom	The steamship struck a rock and foundered off Godrevy Point, Cornwall with the loss of one of her fifteen crew. Survivors were rescued by the steamshp General Elliott (Flag unknown). Elsa was on a voyage from Glasgow, Renfrewshire to Bayonne, Pyrenées-Atlantiques, France.
Hattie Perry	United States	The schooner was driven ashore and wrecked 2 nautical miles (3.7 km) north of Cape Henry, Virginia. She was on a voyage from Philadelphia, Pennsylvania to New Bedford, Massachusetts.
Hermann	German Empire	The steamship was driven ashore at Seafield, Lothian, United Kingdom. She was refloated and take in to Leith, Lothian.
Jeaunine	France	The steamship ran aground at Makassar, Netherlands East Indies. She was refloated and resumed her voyage.
Marlborough	United Kingdom	The steamship ran aground in the River Severn at Sharpness, Gloucestershire.
Saint Kilda	United Kingdom	The steamship ran aground on the East Hoyle Bank, in Liverpool Bay. She was on a voyage from Liverpool, Lancashire to Dublin. She was refloated and resumed her voyage.

== 28 September ==
List of shipwrecks: 28 September 1890
Ship	State	Description
Columbian	United States	The steamship was driven ashore at Towyn Chapel, Anglesey, United Kingdom. She was on a voyage from Boston, Massachusetts to Liverpool, Lancashire, United Kingdom. She was refloated with assistance and resumed her voyage.
Doris	United Kingdom	The schooner was driven ashore west of Dover, Kent. She was on a voyage from Skutskär, Sweden to Gloucester.
Drehna	Germany	The full-rigged ship ran aground on the Goodwin Sands, Kent. She was on a voyage from Antwerp, Belgium to Montreal, Quebec, Canada. She was refloated with assistance and taken in to The Downs.
Gordon Castle	United Kingdom	The steamship ran aground in the North Wall, in Liverpool Bay. She was refloated and put back to Liverpool, Lancashire.
Grimm, or Gymm	Germany	The steamship ran aground on the Goodwin Sands. She was on a voyage from Hamburg to Montreal. She was refloated with the assistance of the tug Aid (United Kingdom) and resumed her voyage.
Matilda	Sweden	The barque was driven ashore at Folkestone, Kent. She was on a voyage from Härnösand to Lisbon, Portugal. She was refloated with the assistance of a tug and resumed her voyage. Also reported as the barquentine Maria ashore at Lydden Spout.
Oceanus	United States	The schooner was abandoned off the Delaware Capes, North Carolina. She was on a voyage from Philadelphia, Pennsylvania to Stonington.

== 30 September ==
List of shipwrecks: 30 September 1890
Ship	State	Description
Hugh Roberts	United Kingdom	The brig was driven ashore and wrecked at Hoxa Head. South Ronaldsay, Orkney Islands. Her crew were rescued. She was on a voyage from the River Tyne to Galway.
Klara	Sweden	The schooner was driven ashore and wrecked at Degerhamn. She was on a voyage from Bremen, Germany to Degerhamn.
Northward	United Kingdom	The steamship ran aground at Fraserburgh, Aberdeenshire. She was refloated and taken in to Fraserburgh, where she was beached for examination.
Saphir	Norway	The brigantine was driven ashore in Weyland Bay, Orkney Islands. She was refloated in late October and towed in to Kirkwall, Orkney Islands.

== Unknown date ==
List of shipwrecks: Unknown September 1890
Ship	State	Description
Ajax	United States	The steamship was wrecked at Cape Mendocino, California. Her crew were rescued.
Arbutus	United Kingdom	The steamship ran aground in the Danube before 20 September. She was on a voyage from Brăila, Romania to Liverpool, Lancashire. She was refloated and resumed her voyage.
Caibarien	United States	The barque was wrecked at "Allate", Mexico. She was on a voyage from San Francisco, California to Santa Rosalía, Mexico.
Carlisle	United Kingdom	The ship struck a rock in the Bass Strait and consequently sank. Her crew survived. She was on a voyage from Melbourne, Victoria to Newcastle, New South Wales.
Charlwood	United Kingdom	The barque ran aground near Buenos Aires, Argentina. She was refloated and towed in to Buenos Aires.
Conservative	United Kingdom	The fishing trawler was run into by the steamship Abraham Sutton (United Kingdom off The Smalls. She was towed in to Milford Haven, Pembrokeshire in a sinking condition.
Drapner	Norway	The barque collided with a steamship and was severely damaged. She was on a voyage from Newcastle, United States to Whitehaven, Cumberland, United Kingdom of Great Britain and Ireland. She put in to Holyhead, Anglesey, United Kingdom in a severely leaky condition.
Duchess	United Kingdom	The steamship ran aground in the Saint Lawrence River. She was on a voyage from Hartlepool, County Durham to Montreal, Quebec, Canada. She was refloated and taken in to Sydney, Nova Scotia, Canada.
Elizabeth Morton	Norway	The schooner was abandoned off Lindesnes by five of the seven people on board. They were rescued by the full-rigged ship Georg (Russia). Elizabeth Morton was subsequently towed in to Mandal by the steamship Louisa (Norway).
Ellen Smeed	United Kingdom	The schooner was driven ashore. She was on a voyage from Antwerp, Belgium to Newcastle upon Tyne, Northumberland. She was refloated and put in to Vlissingen, Zeeland, Netherlands.
Elton	United Kingdom	The steamship was driven ashore at Sevastopol, Russia. She was refloated and resumed her voyage.
Frank	Norway	The barque capsized at sea. She was towed in to "Kungeshamn".
George W. Elder	United Kingdom	The steamship collided with an iceberg in Glacier Bay and was holed. She was beached for temporary repairs.
Madeira	United Kingdom	The barque was driven ashore at Bahía Blanca, Brazil.
Magellan	United States	The full-rigged ship was wrecked in the Pacific Ocean before 4 September. She was on a voyage from Boston, Massachusetts to Valparaíso, Chile.
Moss Rose	United Kingdom	The schooner was driven ashore at Novo Sancti Petri, Spain before 26 September. She was refloated on 27 September and found to be leaky.
Oscar	Norway	The steamship was driven ashore at Tancarville, Seine-Inférieure, France. She was refloated with the assistance of a tug on 15 September.
Rambler	(United Kingdom of Great Britain and Ireland) Jersey	The schooner was abandoned in the Atlantic Ocean. She was towed in to Burin, Newfoundland Colony on 10 September.
Ranney	United States	The steamship collided with Huron ( Canada) at Sarnia, Ontario, Canada and was severely damaged.
Selene	Austria-Hungary	The steamship collided with the steamship Warora (United Kingdom) and was severely damaged. Selene was on a voyage from Bombay to Calcutta, India.
Stella	Norway	The barque was wrecked in the Atlantic Ocean before 19 September. Her crew were rescued by the steamship Stockholm City (United Kingdom). Stella was on a voyage from Newcastle, New Brunswick, Canada to Larne, County Antrim, United Kingdom.
Tremble	United States	The schooner collided with the steamship Welmore (United States) and sank in the St. Clair River.
Unnamed	Flag unknown	The ship was destroyed by fire in the Bay of Biscay before 27 September.
