= List of lighthouses in Norway =

The following is a sortable, but partial list of active and some decommissioned lighthouses along the Norwegian coastline.

The sequence number follows the convention of listing lighthouses from the coastal border in the south with Sweden around the coast and north to coastal border with Russia.

== Lighthouses ==
Name	Image	Status	Municipality	Year first lit	Year automated	Tower height (m)	Focal height (m)	Range (nm)	Owned by	Protected	Coordinates
Torbjørnskjær		Active	Hvaler	1872	1990	17.9	25.7	15	Kystverket	Yes	58.995975°N 10.78248°E
Homlungen		Active	Hvaler	1867	1952	12	13.5	12	Kystverket	Yes	59.016085°N 11.024394°E
Strømtangen F		Active	Fredrikstad	1859	1977	6.9	11.3	11.5	Kystverket	No	59.151115°N 10.829515°E
Struten		Active	Fredrikstad	1907	1985	13.5	20.07	14.2	Kystverket	No	59.117869°N 10.740852°E
Guldholmen		Active	Moss	1894	1985	6	17.6	13.5	Kystverket	No	59.4353°N 10.577087°E
Digerudgrunnen		Demolished	Frogn	1871	1975	7	7.5	10.3	Kystverket	No	59.719515°N 10.586057°E
Dyna		Active	Oslo	1875	1956	12.4	5.6	9.5	Oslo	No	59.894752°N 10.688388°E
Kavringen		Active	Oslo	1892			12m		Oslo	Yes	59.899808°N 10.722013°E
Heggholmen		Active	Oslo	1826	1972	15.2	6.3	8.9	Oslo	Yes	59.885113°N 10.713875°E
Filtvet		Active	Asker	1840	1985	13	13	12	Kystverket	Yes	59°34′15″N 10°37′04″E
Rødtangen		Active	Asker	1840	1897	2	11	7	Private	No	59.528312°N 10.41667°E
Bastøy		Active	Horten	1840	1986	14	16	14	Kystverket	No	59.386607°N 10.53705°E
Hollenderbåen		Active	Færder	1986	1986	13	13	12	Kystverket	No	59.16095°N 10.62599°E
Fulehuk		Active	Færder	1821	1989	15	16.3	13	Kystverket	No	59.175357°N 10.599318°E
Store Færder		In ruins	Færder	1696	NA				Kystverket	In ruins	59.073698°N 10.522928°E
Lille Færder		Active	Færder	1857	2005	43	47	19	Kystverket	Yes	59.02576°N 10.522327°E
Svenner		Active	Larvik	1874	2003	18.7	40.3	17.8	Kystverket	Yes	58.969172°N 10.148191°E
Tvistein		Active	Larvik	1908	1987	6	17	13.2	Kystverket	No	58.938009°N 9.936790°E
Stavernsodden		Active	Larvik	1855	1984	8.5	43.9	14.9	Kystverket	Yes	58.987573°N 10.052404°E
Langøytangen		Active	Bamble	1839	1990	14.5	18.5	13.5	Kystverket	No	58.993914°N 9.763791°E
Jomfruland		Active	Kragerø	1839	1991	31	48	19	Kystverket	Yes	58.866668°N 9.599612°E
Strømtangen K		Active	Kragerø	1874	1962	8.8	7.6	10.4	Kystverket	Yes	58.837135°N 9.465722°E
Stavseng		Active	Kragerø	1874	1968	16.7	25.7	12	Kystverket	Yes	58.851887°N 9.455445°E
Stangholmen		Active	Risør	1855	1949	9.1	10.4	8.5	Risør	No	58.709804°N 9.245136°E
Lyngør		Active	Tvedestrand	1879	2004	16.9	21.3	14	Kystverket	Yes	58.636338°N 9.149713°E
Ytre Møkkalasset		1986	Arendal	1888	1946	17.2	17.1	11.8	Kystverket	Yes	58.541035°N 9.004498°E
Sandvikodden		Active	Arendal	1844	1934	10.7	17	11.5	Private	Yes	58.436634°N 8.784016°E
Lille Torungen		1914	Arendal	1844	NA	28.9	42.5	18	Kystverket	Yes	58.420547°N 8.821602°E
Store Torungen		Active	Arendal	1844	2004	34.3	43.3	18.5	Kystverket	Yes	58.399651°N 8.79186°E
Rivingen		Active	Grimstad	1886	1925	10	12.3	11.5	Kystverket	No	58.304491°N 8.585794°E
Homborsund		Active	Grimstad	1879	1992	20.1	22.3	14.5	Kystverket	Yes	58.254739°N 8.531807°E
Saltholmen		1952	Lillesand	1882	NA	11	14	12	Private	Yes	58.231872°N 8.404894°E
Oksøy		Active	Kristiansand	1832	2004	36	47	19	Kystverket	Yes	58.074986°N 8.060445°E
Grønningen		Active	Kristiansand	1878	1980	14	18.7	13.5	Kystverket	Yes	58.091142°N 8.116423°E
Odderøya		Active	Kristiansand	1832	1984	7.8	19.1	13.8	Kystverket	Yes	58.131742°N 8.003650°E
Songvår		Active	Kristiansand	1888	1987	10	23.2	14.5	Kystverket	No	58.016832°N 7.813263°E
Ryvingen		Active	Lindesnes	1867	2002	22.5	52	19.5	Kystverket	Yes	57.977772°N 7.519576°E
Hatholmen		Active	Lindesnes	1867	1984	7.2	19	9.6	Kystverket	Yes	58.003903°N 7.450864°E
Lindesnes		Active	Lindesnes	1655	2003	16.1	50.1	19.4	Kystverket	Yes	57.982986°N 7.048015°E
Søndre Katland		Active	Farsund	1878	1948	14.5	19.4	8.9	Kystverket	No	58.066751°N 6.868474°E
Lista		Active	Farsund	1836	2003	34	39.5	17.5	Kystverket	Yes	58.110038°N 6.568939°E
Lille Presteskjær		Active	Sokndal	1895	1973	20.8	23.5	11.2	Kystverket	Yes	58.322921°N 6.258269°E
Eigerøy		Active	Eigersund	1854	1989	32.9	46.5	18.8	Kystverket	Yes	58.431053°N 5.868547°E
Viberodden		Active	Eigersund	1855	1977	9.1	22	14.4	Kystverket	No	58.420069°N 5.991576°E
Kvassheim		Active	Hå	1912	1990	12	16	13	Kystverket	No	58.552992°N 5.710229°E
Obrestad		Active	Hå	1873	1991	16.5	39	17.6	Kystverket	Yes	58.658424°N 5.555113°E
Flatholmen		Active	Sola	1862	1984	8	17.5	13.3	Kystverket	No	58.932566°N 5.583973°E
Feistein		Active	Klepp	1859	1990	25	34	16.8	Kystverket	Yes	58.826703°N 5.505782°E
Tungenes		Active	Randaberg	1828	1984	12	17.5	13.8	Kystverket	Yes	59.036735°N 5.582841°E
Fjøløy		Active	Stavanger	1849	1977	6.9	17.5	13.8	Kystverket	No	59.089897°N 5.570193°E
Kvitsøy		Active	Kvitsøy	1700	1969	27	45.2	18.5	Kystverket	Yes	59.062892°N 5.404392°E
Skudenes		1924	Karmøy	1799	1924	6.5	22	12.5	Private	Yes	59.141394°N 5.294403°E
Høgevarde Lighthouse		1902	Karmøy	1700							
Geitungen		Active	Karmøy	1924	1999	11.2	41	17.8	Kystverket	Yes	59.132006°N 5.244134°E
Røværsholmen		Active	Haugesund	1892	1975	15.5	22.5	14.6	Kystverket	Yes	59.451912°N 5.070019°E
Utsira		Active	Utsira	1844	2003	13.3	78.2	23	Kystverket	Yes	59.307453°N 4.874084°E
Ryvarden		Active	Sveio	1849	1984	6.9	22.3	13.4	Kystverket	No	59.527528°N 5.227107°E
Slåtterøy		Active	Bømlo	1859	2003	25.1	45.8	18.5	Kystverket	Yes	59.909002°N 5.070315°E
Marstein		Active	Austevoll	1877	2002	17.3	38	17.5	Kystverket	No	60.140499°N 5.039908°E
Hellisøy		Active	Fedje	1855	1992	32.3	46.5	18.8	Kystverket	Yes	60.858276°N 4.906617°E
Holmengrå		Active	Fedje	1892	1986	16	35.5	17.1	Kystverket	No	60.852954°N 4.680139°E
Utvær		Active	Solund	1900	2004	31	45	18.6	Kystverket	Yes	61.039002°N 4.518927°E
Geita		Active	Askvoll	1897	1982	31	42.8	16.9	Kystverket	Yes	61.279159°N 4.842136°E
Stabben		Active	Kinn	1867	1975	15.6	16.2	13	Kystverket	Yes	61.601129°N 4.956565°E
Kvanhovden		Active	Kinn	1895	1980	10	40.3	17.7	Kystverket	No	61.697715°N 4.833867°E
Ytterøyane		Active	Kinn	1881	2004	31	57.5	20.4	Kystverket	Yes	61.571272°N 4.682366°E
Hendanes		Active	Kinn	1914	1952	12	48.5	19	Kystverket	No	61.965227°N 5.03634°E
Skongenes		Active	Kinn	1870	1985	10	19.5	13.9	Kystverket	No	62.033029°N 5.125022°E
Kråkenes		Active	Kinn	1906	1986	10.5	45.2	17.5	Kystverket	No	62.035164°N 4.987435°E
Ulvesund		Active	Kinn	1870	1985	10	16	13	Kystverket	No	61.994434°N 5.201704°E
Haugsholmen		Active	Sande	1876	1980	10	19.7	14	Kystverket	No	62.177847°N 5.366266°E
Flåvær		Active	Herøy	1870	1979	13.8	16.8	13.2	Kystverket	No	62.315854°N 5.585521°E
Svinøy		Active	Herøy	1905	2004	10.8	46.2	18.5	Kystverket	No	62.328394°N 5.271794°E
Runde		Active	Herøy	1767	2002	10	49.5	19	Kystverket	No	62.414331°N 5.589925°E
Grasøyane		Active	Ulstein	1886	1986	20.5	28.8	15.6	Kystverket	Yes	62.440427°N 5.792251°E
Hogsteinen		1905	Giske	1857					Kystverket	Yes	62.4705°N 6.0033°E
Ålesund		Active	Giske	1858	1889		6	6	Kystverket	No	62.475702°N 6.166698°E
Storholmen		Active	Giske	1920	1980	22	35.6	17	Kystverket	No	62.643596°N 5.926359°E
Erkna		Active	Giske	1870	1991	10.5	49.5	17.5	Kystverket	No	62.559892°N 5.97306°E
Alnes		Active	Giske	1853	1982	22.5	36	16.4	Kystverket	Yes	62.491139°N 5.97245°E
Lepsøyrev		Active	Haram	1879	1956	11.5	10.8	4	Kystverket	No	62.58949°N 6.264282°E
Rødholmen		Active	Haram	1893	1954	11.5	13.7	12	Kystverket	No	62.7983°N 6.979228°E
Hellevik		Active	Haram	1880	1973	9	28.2	15.7	Kystverket	No	62.647153°N 6.204692°E
Ulla		Active	Haram	1874	1975	10.5	21.5	14.2	Kystverket	Yes	62.694972°N 6.198419°E
Ona		Active	Ålesund	1867	1971	14.7	40	15	Kystverket	No	62.86614°N 6.551539°E
Flatflesa		Active	Ålesund	1902	1988	22.6	25.3	15	Kystverket	No	62.848066°N 6.722879°E
Bjørnsund		Active	Hustadvika	1871	1993	5	26	15.3	Kystverket	No	62.896563°N 6.819267°E
Kvitholmen		Active	Hustadvika	1842	1980	12	25	15.1	Kystverket	Yes	63.024302°N 7.242144°E
Stavenes		Active	Averøy	1842	1976	4	21.7	14.3	Kystverket	No	63.115631°N 7.668657°E
Skalmen		Active	Smøla	1907	2002	15.5	24	14.8	Kystverket	No	63.48199°N 7.791236°E
Hestskjær Lighthouse		Active	Smøla	1879	1986						
Haugjegla		Active	Smøla	1922	1988	28	26.5	15.3	Kystverket	Yes	63.535412°N 7.971088°E
Tyrhaug Lighthouse		Active	Smøla	1833							
Grip		Active	Kristiansund	1888	1977	44	47	19	Kystverket	Yes	63.243641°N 7.642802°E
Terningen		Active	Hitra	1833	1991	12	17.3	13.4	Kystverket	No	63.495724°N 9.045335°E
Børøyholmen		1970	Hitra	1874	1970	8	13.3	9.9	Kystverket	No	63.5719°N 9.2225°E
Agdenes		1984	Orkland	1804	NA	14.5	37.8	16.9	Kystverket	No	63.647269°N 9.745769°E
Skansen Lighthouse			Trondheim								
Lade molo, nordre fyrlykt			Trondheim								
Sletringen		Active	Frøya	1899	1993	45	46	18.5	Kystverket	Yes	63.666656°N 8.264735°E
Sula		Active	Frøya	1909	1974	13	43.5	18	Kystverket	Yes	63.857321°N 8.487169°E
Vingleia		Active	Frøya	1921	1985	15	16	13	Kystverket	No	63.917214°N 8.676773°E
Finnvær		Active	Frøya	1912	1985	15	23	14.5	Kystverket	Yes	64.070574°N 9.115365°E
Halten		Active	Frøya	1875	2004	29.5	39	17.5	Kystverket	Yes	64.173385°N 9.40877°E
Kjeungskjær		Active	Ørland	1880	1987	20.6	17.5	13.1	Kystverket	Yes	63.727901°N 9.535026°E
Kaura		Active	Åfjord	1931	1959	22	30	16	Kystverket	Yes	64.23994°N 10.167589°E
Asenvågøy		Active	Ørland	1921	1975	14	30	16	Kystverket	No	63.951846°N 9.80622°E
Buholmråsa		Active	Osen	1917	1994	23.5	36	17.2	Kystverket	Yes	64.40246°N 10.456782°E
Kya		Active	Osen	1920	1958	22.5	29	15.6	Kystverket	Yes	64.473927°N 10.246873°E
Villa		1890	Flatanger	1839	NA	14.7	39.2	18	Kystverket	Yes	64.612442°N 10.924216°E
Ellingråsa		Active	Flatanger	1888	1959	10.7	22.5	14.5	Kystverket	No	64.575828°N 10.80441°E
Grinna		Active	Nærøysund	1904	1987	19	23	14.7	Kystverket	No	64.755561°N 10.980834°E
Gjeslingene		Active	Nærøysund	1877	1987	24.3	23.3	14.7	Kystverket	Yes	64.736757°N 10.889181°E
Nordøyan		Active	Nærøysund	1890	2004	24.3	23.3	14.7	Kystverket	Yes	64.800362°N 10.553601°E
Nærøysund		1984	Nærøysund	1904	NA	13.3	13.3	15	Kystverket	Yes	64.843335°N 11.196545°E
Sklinna		Active	Leka	1910	2004	14.3	45	18.5	Kystverket	Yes	65.20496°N 11.005889°E
Bremstein		Active	Vega	1925	1980	27	41.5	18	Kystverket	Yes	65.606402°N 11.323492°E
Ytterholmen		Active	Herøy	1912	2001	8	47.4	19	Kystverket	No	66.023004°N 11.724834°E
Åsvær		Active	Dønna	1876	1980	18.5	24.5	15	Kystverket	Yes	66.274819°N 12.333918°E
Træna		Active	Træna	1877	1974	22.5	36.7	17	Kystverket	No	66.432128°N 11.973018°E
Myken		Active	Rødøy	1918	1975	12.5	40.3	16.8	Kystverket	Yes	66.774333°N 12.5153°E
Kalsholmen		Active	Meløy	1919	1994	14.3	45	18.5	Kystverket	No	66.923592°N 13.13064°E
Støtt		1954	Meløy	1867	NA	12.5	15	12.5	Kystverket	No	66.926032°N 13.45087°E
Nyholmen		Active	Bodø	1875	1907	9.7	18.2	12	Kystverket	Yes	67.287145°N 14.367536°E
Tennholmen		Active	Bodø	1901	2003	14.4	27.3	15.5	Kystverket	No	67.311827°N 13.537571°E
Bjørnøy		1972	Bodø	1890	NA	9	45.7	16.8	Kystverket	No	67.429628°N 14.468408°E
Landegode		Active	Bodø	1902	1993	29.3	40.8	17.8	Kystverket	Yes	67.448661°N 14.384652°E
Grytøy		Active	Bodø	1865	1959	12.5	33	14.5	Kystverket	No	67.390879°N 13.850179°E
Måløy-Skarholmen		Active	Steigen	1922	1979	34.5	42.3	18	Kystverket	Yes	67.769313°N 14.405871°E
Flatøy		Active	Steigen	1882	1966	13	47	17.6	Kystverket	Yes	67.93009°N 14.808557°E
Tranøy		Active	Hamarøy	1864	1991	27.3	28	15.6	Kystverket	Yes	68.184841°N 15.602631°E
Barøy		Active	Narvik	1903	1980	10	28.5	15.5	Kystverket	No	68.354704°N 16.083801°E
Skomvær		Active	Røst	1887	1978	31.7	47	18.9	Kystverket	Yes	67.412129°N 11.879002°E
Værøy		Active	Værøy	1880	1984	13.8	14.5	12.5	Kystverket	No	67.651795°N 12.727346°E
Glåpen		Active	Moskenes	1857	1985	7.2	40	17.5	Kystverket	No	67.897322°N 13.076487°E
Moholmen		Active	Vågan	1914	1974	12.5	23.1	14.4	Kystverket	No	68.167635°N 14.447203°E
Skrova		Active	Vågan	1922	2005	24.5	41	18	Kystverket	Yes	68.153631°N 14.651908°E
Rotvær		Active	Lødingen	1914	1985	13.4	22	14	Kystverket	No	68.37757°N 15.985182°E
Litløy		Active	Bø	1912	2004	10.9	55.5	20	Kystverket and private	No	68.60338°N 14.350348°E
Anda		Active	Øksnes	1932	1987	16	50	18.2	Kystverket	Yes	69.068189°N 15.177611°E
Sjåberget Lighthouse		Active	Andøy								
Andenes		Active	Andøy	1859	1978	40	40	17.8	Govt and private	Yes	69.325136°N 16.1203°E
Hekkingen		Active	Senja	1859	2004	9.8	22.8	14.6	Kystverket	Yes	69.602829°N 17.834818°E
Torsvåg		Active	Karlsøy	1916	2006	9.6	32.5	15.8	Kystverket	No	70.255213°N 19.543689°E
Fugløykalven		Active	Karlsøy	1920	2003	8.5	41.1	17.4	Kystverket	Yes	70.326366°N 20.19718°E
Fruholmen		Active	Måsøy	1866	2006	18	47.7	19	Kystverket	No	71.103345°N 24.028149°E
Helnes		Active	Nordkapp	1908	2004	10	37.5	17.2	Kystverket	No	71.071055°N 26.26724°E
Kjølnes		Active	Berlevåg	1916	1994	22	25.7	15	Kystverket	Yes	70.854218°N 29.244668°E
Slettnes		Active	Gamvik	1905	2005	39	44	17.6	Kystverket	Yes	71.090306°N 28.22508°E
Makkaur		Active	Båtsfjord	1928	2005	13.5	39	17.6	Kystverket	Yes	70.716531°N 30.131351°E
Vardø		Active	Vardø	1896	1991	20.5	77.2	23	Kystverket	Yes	70.398434°N 31.213652°E
Bøkfjord		Active	Sør-Varanger	1910	2006	10	33	16	Kystverket	Yes	69.886587°N 30.228802°E

== See also ==
- Lists of lighthouses and lightvessels
- Lighthouses in Norway
