= Struten Lighthouse =

Coastal lighthouse in Fredrikstad, Norway

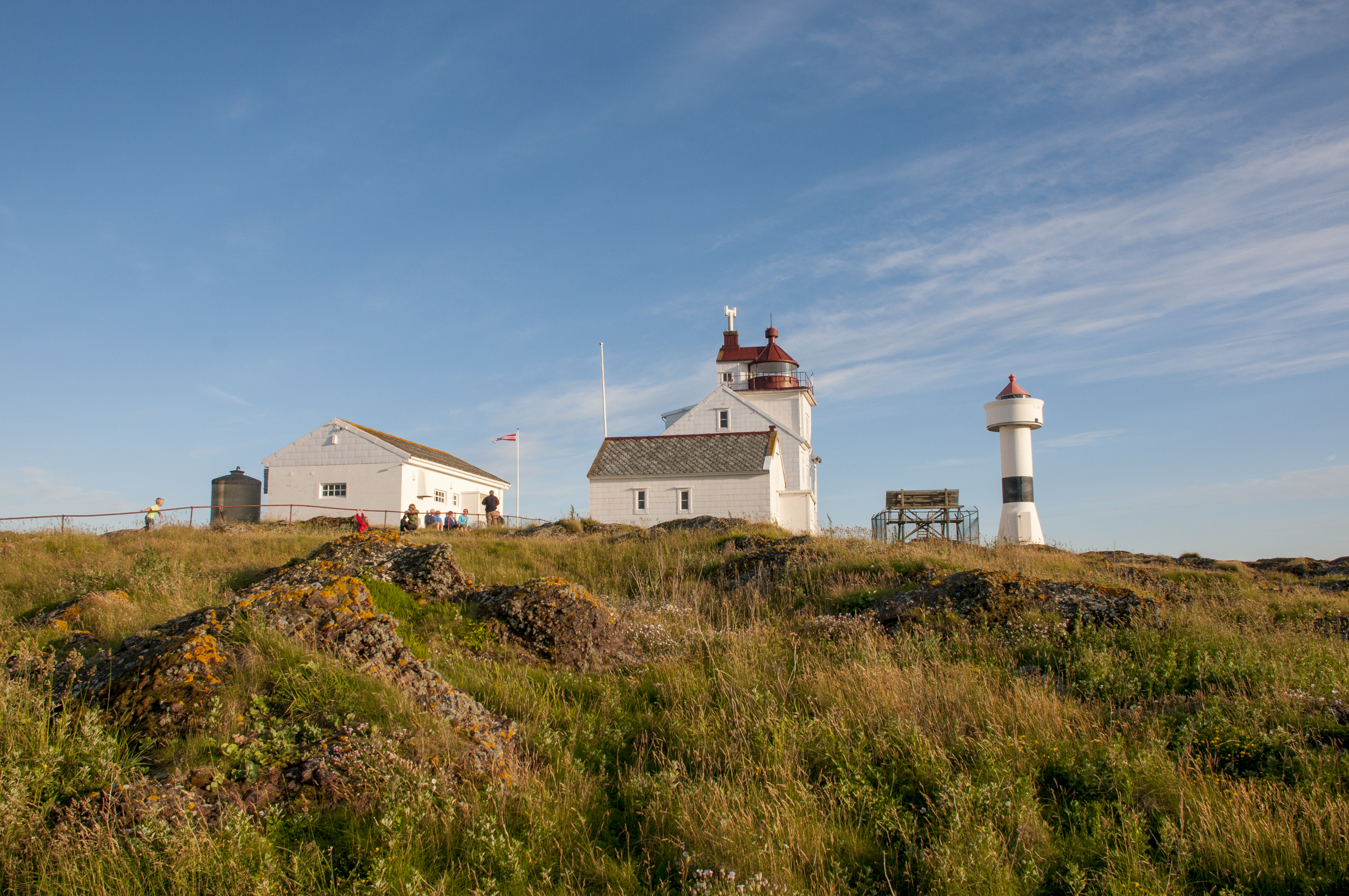
- Location: Struten, Fredrikstad, Norway
- Coordinates: 59°07′N 10°44′E

Tower
- Constructed: 1907
- Construction: lumber (tower)
- Height: 12.5 m (41 ft)
- Shape: square tower with balcony and lantern
- Markings: white (tower), red (lantern), red (balcony)

Light
- Deactivated: 1985
- Active light
- Constructed: 1985
- Construction: concrete (tower)
- Height: 12 m (39 ft)
- Shape: cylindrical tower with balcony and small lantern
- Markings: white tower with a black band, red lantern roof
- Power source: solar power
- Operator: Struten Fyr
- Focal height: 19 m (62 ft)
- Intensity: 27,900 candela
- Range: 14.2 nmi (26.3 km; 16.3 mi)
- Characteristic: Oc WRG 6s

Struten Lighthouse (Norwegian: Struten fyr) is a coastal lighthouse in the municipality of Fredrikstad in Østfold, Norway. The lighthouse is located on an islet in the outer Oslofjord, south of the island Hankø. It was established in 1907, and automated in 1985.

== See also ==
- List of lighthouses in Norway
- Lighthouses in Norway
