= Naval Pilot Authority =

The Naval Pilot Authority (Norwegian: Losvesenet) was a government agency responsible for maritime pilotage in Norway between 1899 and 1974. Its central administration was the Naval Pilot Directorate (Losdirektoratet) in Oslo. The operational organization consisted of a varying number of district offices. The authority became part of the Norwegian Coastal Administration from 1 June 1974.

== History ==
Pilotage had taken place along the coast of Norway since prehistory. In early times pilots had a competitive regime, where several candidates would race to reach a potential ship to collect the fee. Because of the hard competition, pilots would often fare out in too-harsh conditions, frequently meeting an early death. However, the occupation was amongst the best paid in rural areas. From 1720 there were introduced piloting exams. The pilots owned their own boats an hired an assistant, often their own sons, to operate the boat for them. From 1899 the competitive pilot system was abolished and a new piloting law was introduced, establishing the Naval Pilot Authority.

The agency was initially organized in three regions, Sønnendfjeldske headquartered in Oslo, Vestenfjeldske in Bergen and Northern Norway based in Tromsø. Each was led by a head pilot (overlos). They were subdivided into a series of pilot olderman district, counting 26 in 1947. The Naval Pilot Directorate, which was based in Oslo, was established as a subsidiary of the Ministry of Trade and Industry on 9 April 1948. It took over the central coordination of the authority, replacing the regions. It was horizontally moved to the Ministry of Fisheries from 1 January 1952.

The directorate was merged with the Lighthouse and Buoy Authority, and the Port Authority on 1 June 1974 to create the Norwegian Coastal Administration. However, the Naval Pilot Authority continued as an independent operational agency until 1980.
