= Nyholmen Lighthouse =

Coastal lighthouse in Norway

Nyholmen Lighthouse Nyholmen fyrstasjon
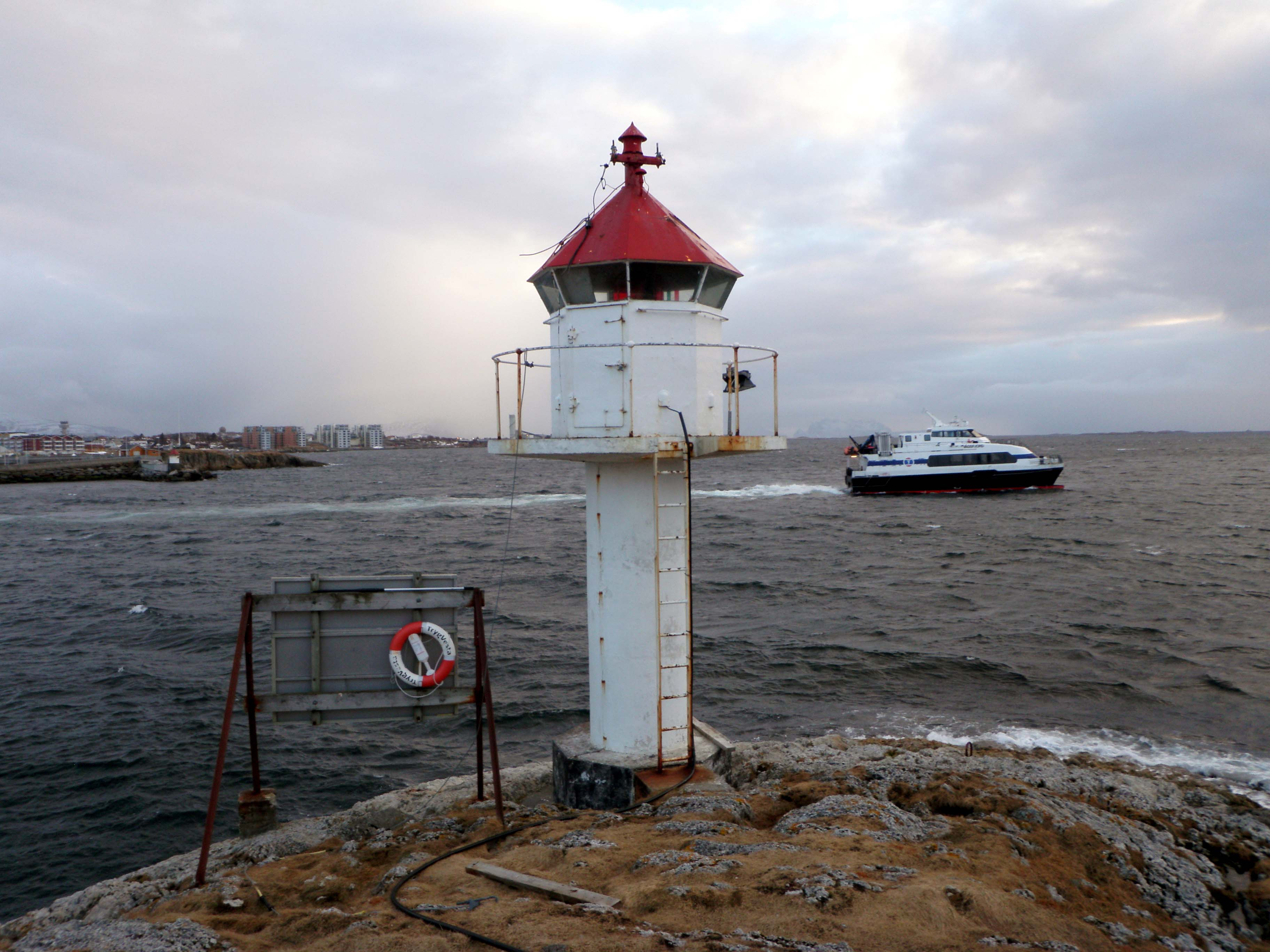
- View of the lighthouse
- Location of the lighthouse
- Location: Nordland, Norway
- Coordinates: 67°17′10″N 14°21′53″E

Tower
- Constructed: 2017 (current)
- Construction: fiberglass
- Automated: 1907
- Height: 7.4 m (24 ft)
- Shape: cylindrical tower
- Markings: white tower, red roof
- Heritage: cultural property

Light
- Deactivated: 2017 (second)
- Focal height: 7.5 m (25 ft)
- Range: 3 nmi (5.6 km; 3.5 mi) (white), 2 nmi (3.7 km; 2.3 mi) (red), 2 nmi (3.7 km; 2.3 mi) (green)
- Characteristic: Oc WRG 6s
- Norway no.: 698000
- Original light
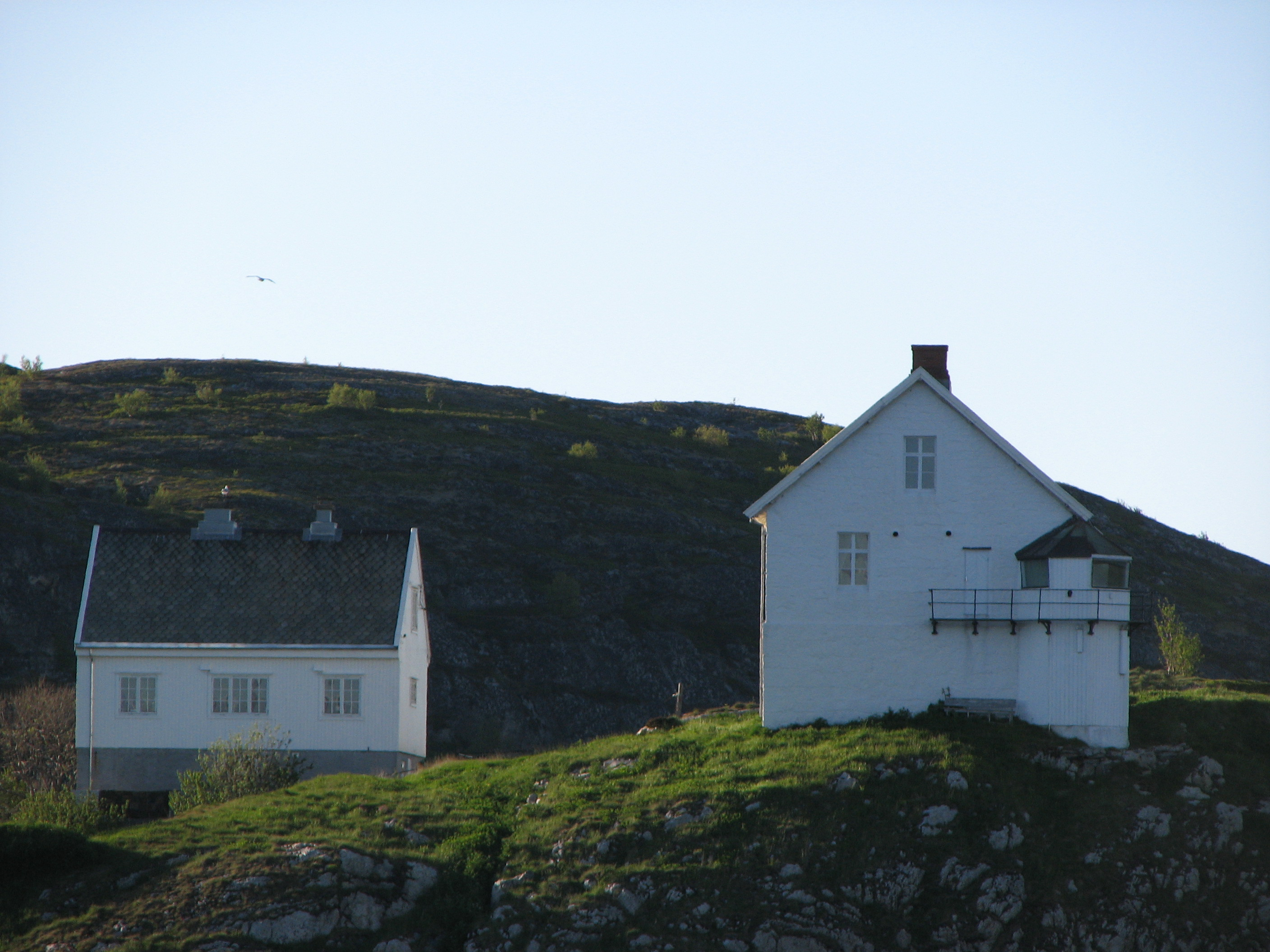
- Constructed: 1875
- Deactivated: 1907

Nyholmen Lighthouse (Norwegian: Nyholmen fyr, formerly called Bodø fyr) is a coastal lighthouse in Bodø Municipality in Nordland county, Norway. It is located on the extreme southwestern tip of a small island (connected to the mainland by a causeway) in the northern part of the harbour for the town of Bodø.

The light sits atop a 7.4-metre (24 ft) tall white, fiberglass tower. The light sits at an elevation of 7.6 metres (25 ft) above sea level. It flashes white, red, or green light (depending on direction), occulting once every six seconds.

== History ==
The original lighthouse was built in 1875 and it consisted of a 5-metre (16 ft) tall octagonal cast iron tower attached to the front corner of a stone, white, 1 1/2-story keeper's house. That light was discontinued in 1907 when a new tower was built closer to the southwestern tip of the island. The new light was automated on the top of a concrete tower. The old lighthouse was transferred to the Society for the Preservation of Ancient Norwegian Monuments in 1987. In 2017, the old 110-year-old concrete light tower was taken down and replaced with a similar fiberglass tower.

== See also ==
- Lighthouses in Norway
- List of lighthouses in Norway
