= Grinna Lighthouse =

Coastal lighthouse in Norway

Grinna Lighthouse Grinna fyrstasjon
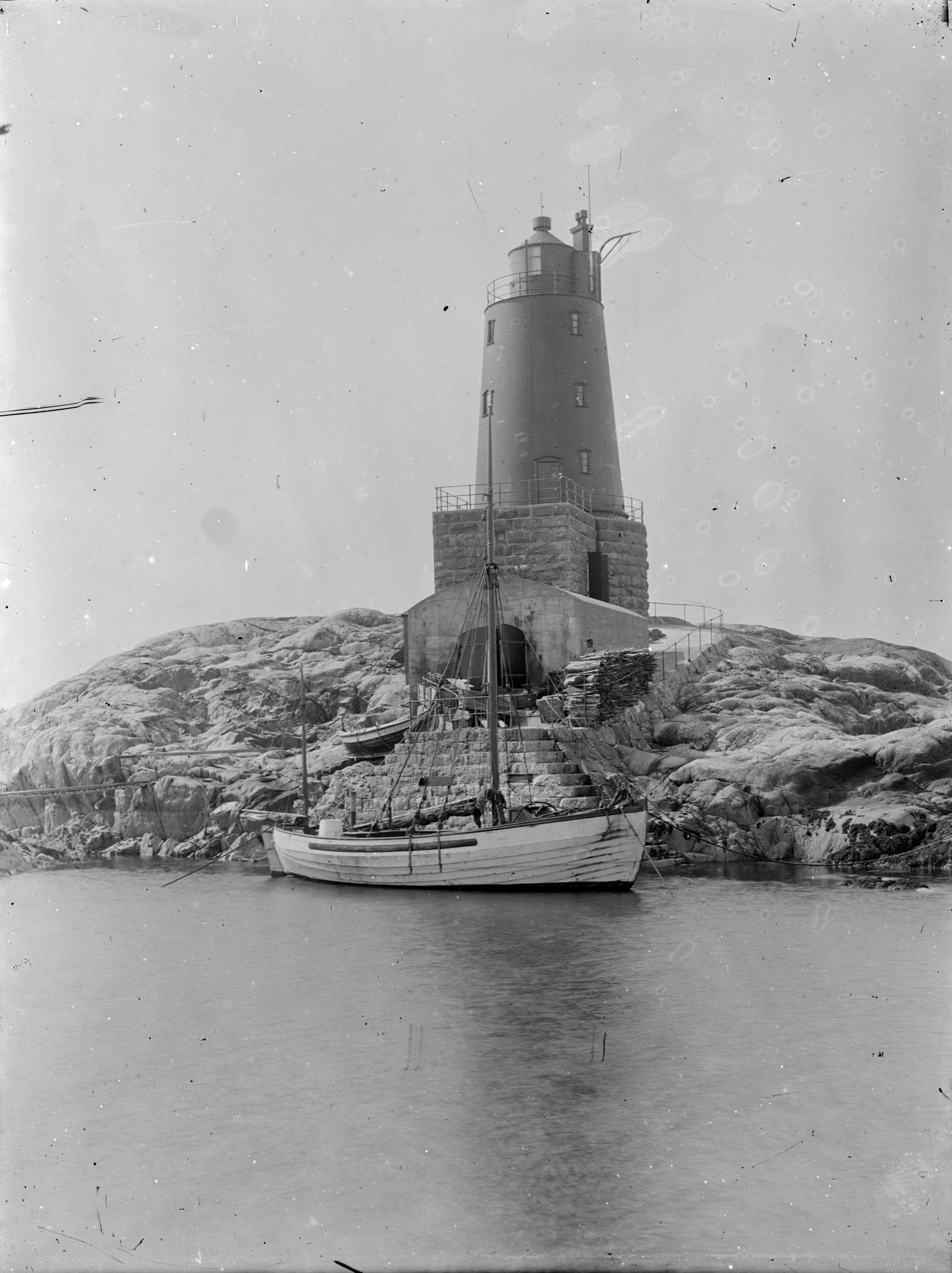
- View of the lighthouse
- Location: Trøndelag, Norway
- Coordinates: 64°45′15.8″N 10°58′30.1″E

Tower
- Constructed: 1904
- Foundation: Stone
- Construction: Cast iron tower
- Automated: 1987
- Height: 19 metres (62 ft)
- Shape: Cylindrical tower
- Markings: Red
- Power source: solar power

Light
- First lit: 1987
- Focal height: 23 metres (75 ft)
- Range: 12.5 nmi (23.2 km; 14.4 mi)
- Characteristic: Oc WRG 6s
- Norway no.: 529500

Grinna Lighthouse (Norwegian: Grinna fyr) is a coastal lighthouse in Nærøysund Municipality in Trøndelag, Norway. It was established in 1904 and automated in 1987. Grinna lighthouse stands on the islet of Grinna in the South Gjæslingan island group on the north side of the Foldafjord. The 19-metre (62 ft) high red tower emits a light every six seconds. The white occulting light flashes every six seconds, and it can be seen for about 12.5 nautical miles (23.2 km; 14.4 mi).

== See also ==
- Lighthouses in Norway
- List of lighthouses in Norway
