= Sandvigodden Lighthouse =

Coastal lighthouse in Norway

Sandvigodden Lighthouse Sandvigodden fyrstasjon
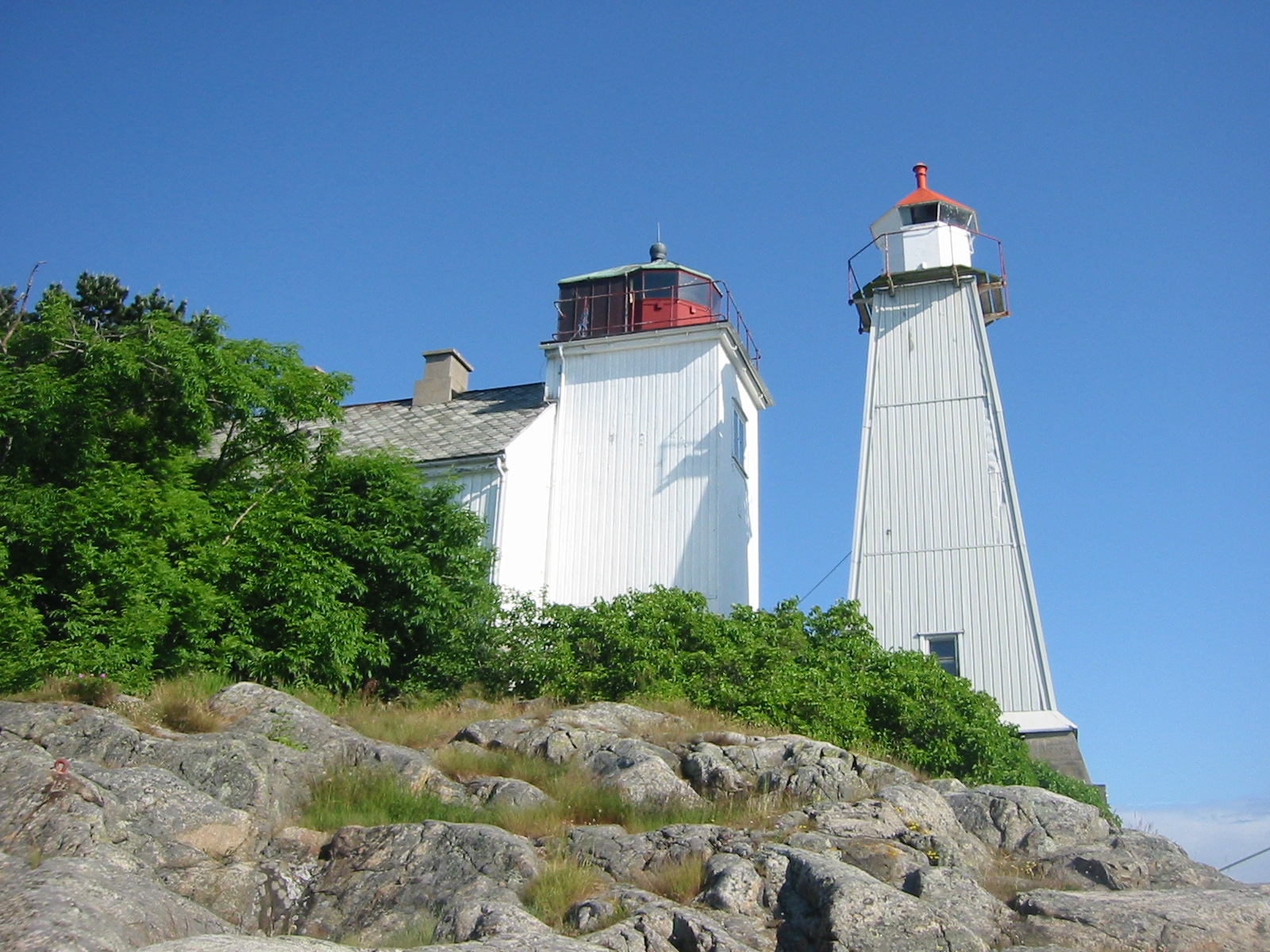
- View of the old and new lighthouse at Sandvigodden
- Location: Hisøya, Arendal, Norway
- Coordinates: 58°24′N 8°48′E

Tower
- Constructed: 1844
- Automated: 1934
- Height: 14 m (46 ft)
- Shape: Square
- Markings: White with red top
- Heritage: cultural property

Light
- Focal height: 14.3 m (47 ft)
- Range: 5.9 nmi (10.9 km; 6.8 mi)
- Characteristic: Oc(3) WRG 10s
- Norway no.: 061700

Sandvigodden Lighthouse (Norwegian: Sandvigodden fyrstasjon, Sandvikodden fyrstasjon) is a coastal lighthouse in Arendal Municipality in Agder county, Norway. The light is located on the southeast shore of the island of Hisøya on the edge of the village of Sandviga. The light marks the west side of the entrance to the Galtesundet strait, which leads north to the town of Arendal.

The lighthouse was originally built in 1844. In 1934, a new lighthouse was constructed right in front of the older tower. The new tower is 14 metres (46 ft) tall and is painted white with a red top. The light sits on top at an elevation of 14.3 metres (47 ft) above sea level. The light emits a white, red, or green light (depending on direction), occulting three times every 10 seconds. The light can be seen for up to 5.9 nautical miles (10.9 km; 6.8 mi).

== History ==
The original lighthouse was built in 1844 out of masonry. The 17-metre (56 ft) tall tower was painted white with a red top. The tower was attached to a two and a half story lighthouse keeper's house. Local ship owners gave money to construct this lighthouse. It was closed in 1934 when a new automated lighthouse was built immediately next to the old tower. The old keepers house and tower were sold and are now a private residence.

== Media gallery ==
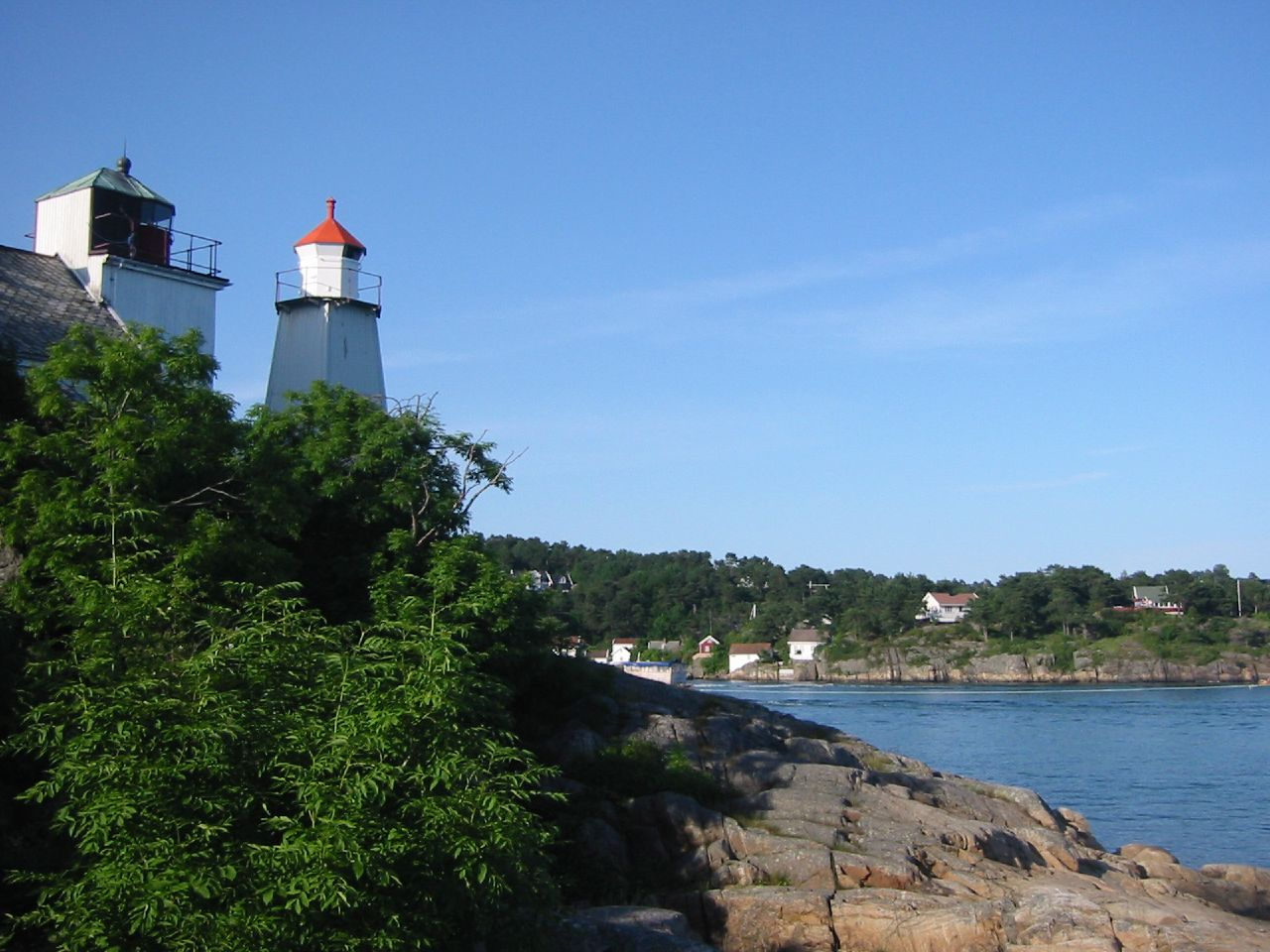
View of the old and new lighthouses

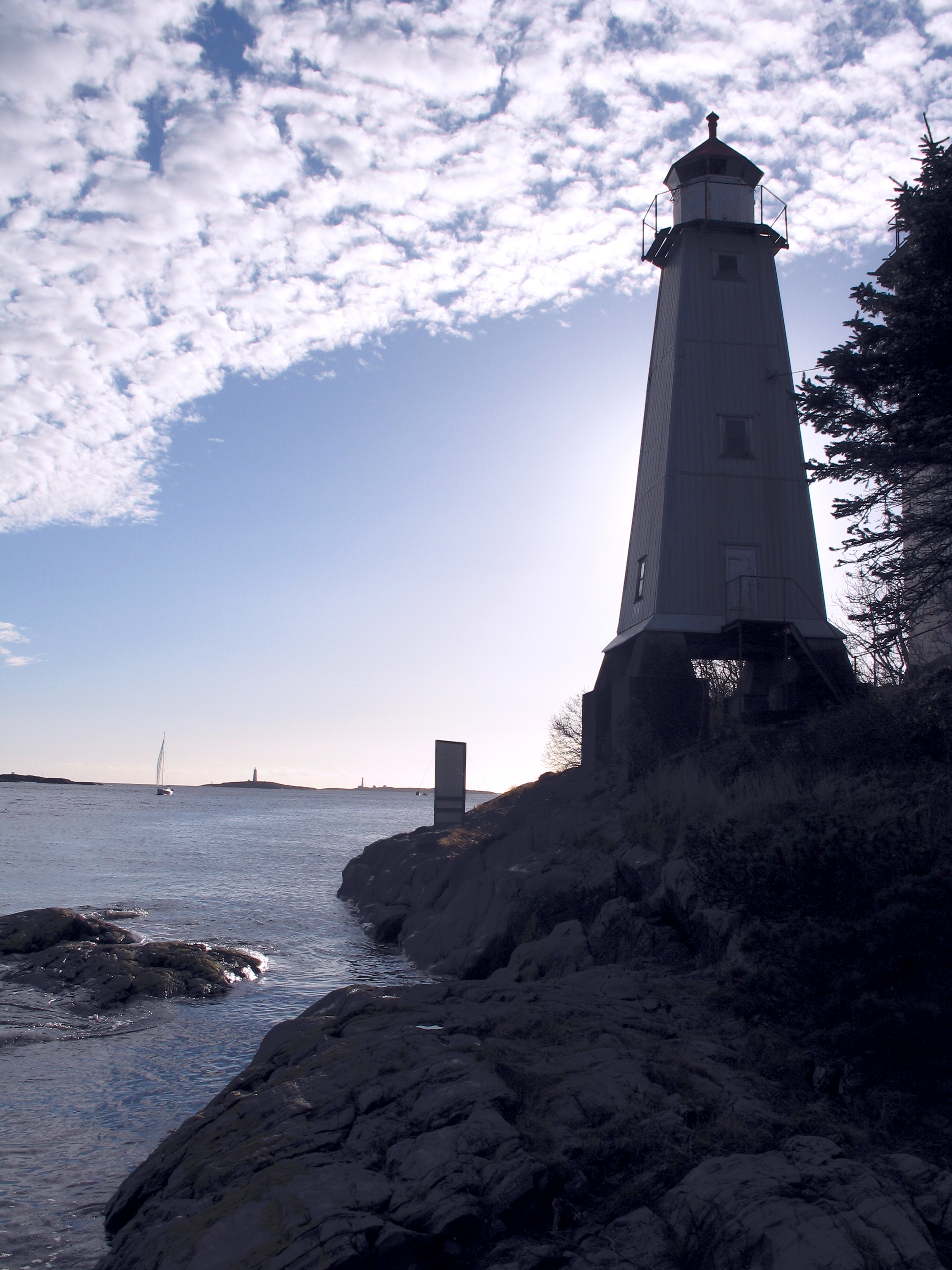
The newer (1934) lighthouse

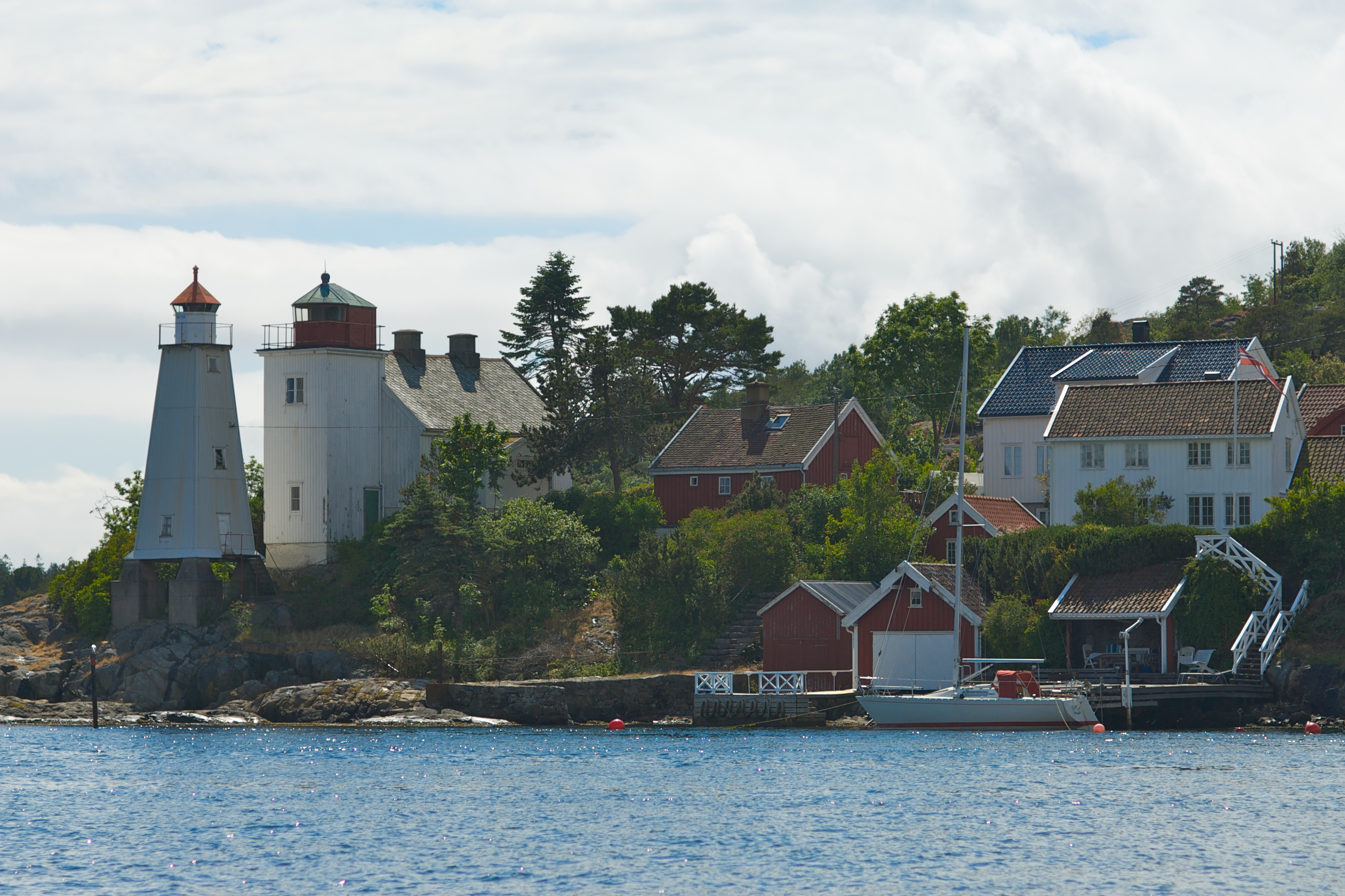
Looking south towards Sandvigodden

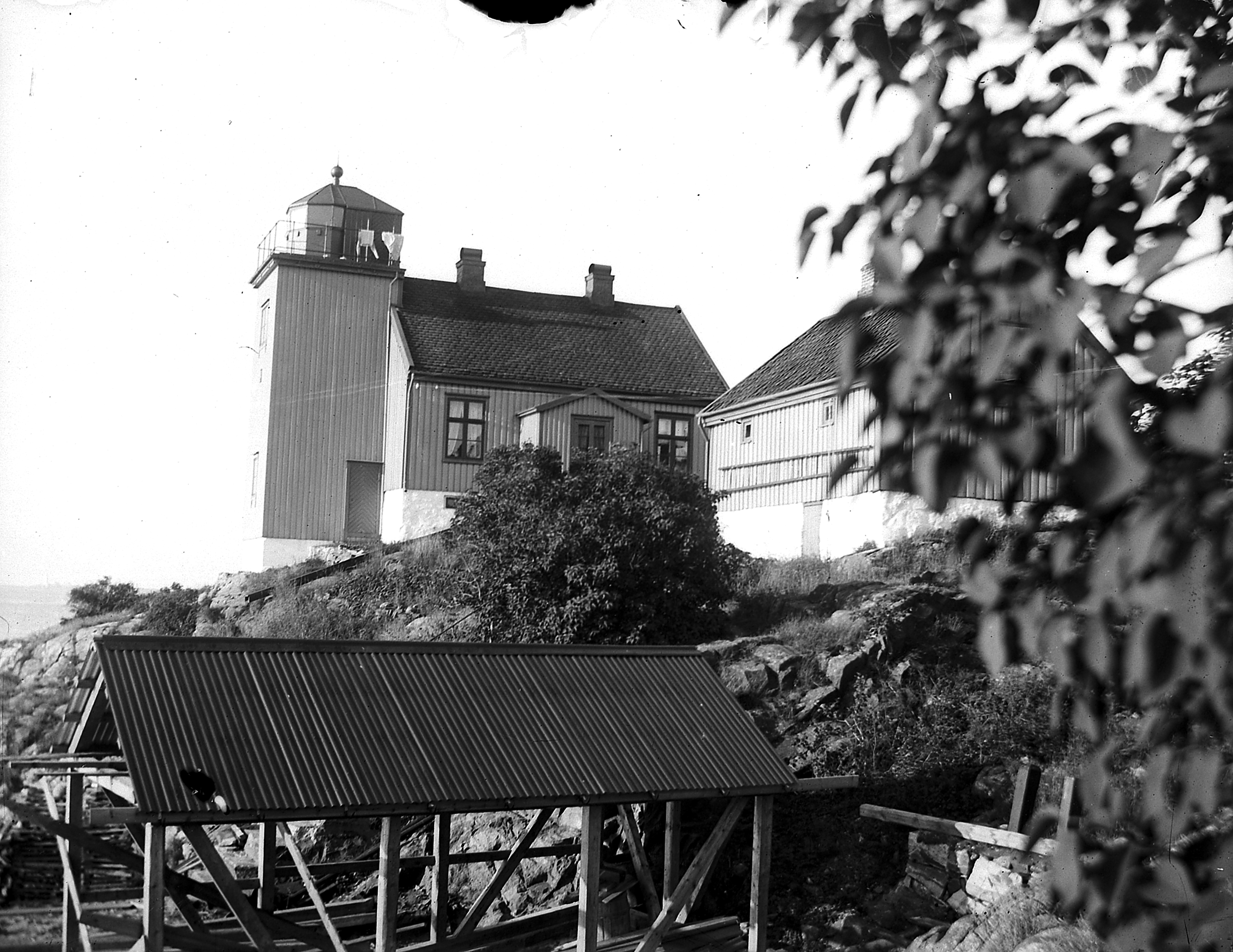
The old lighthouse (c. 1900)

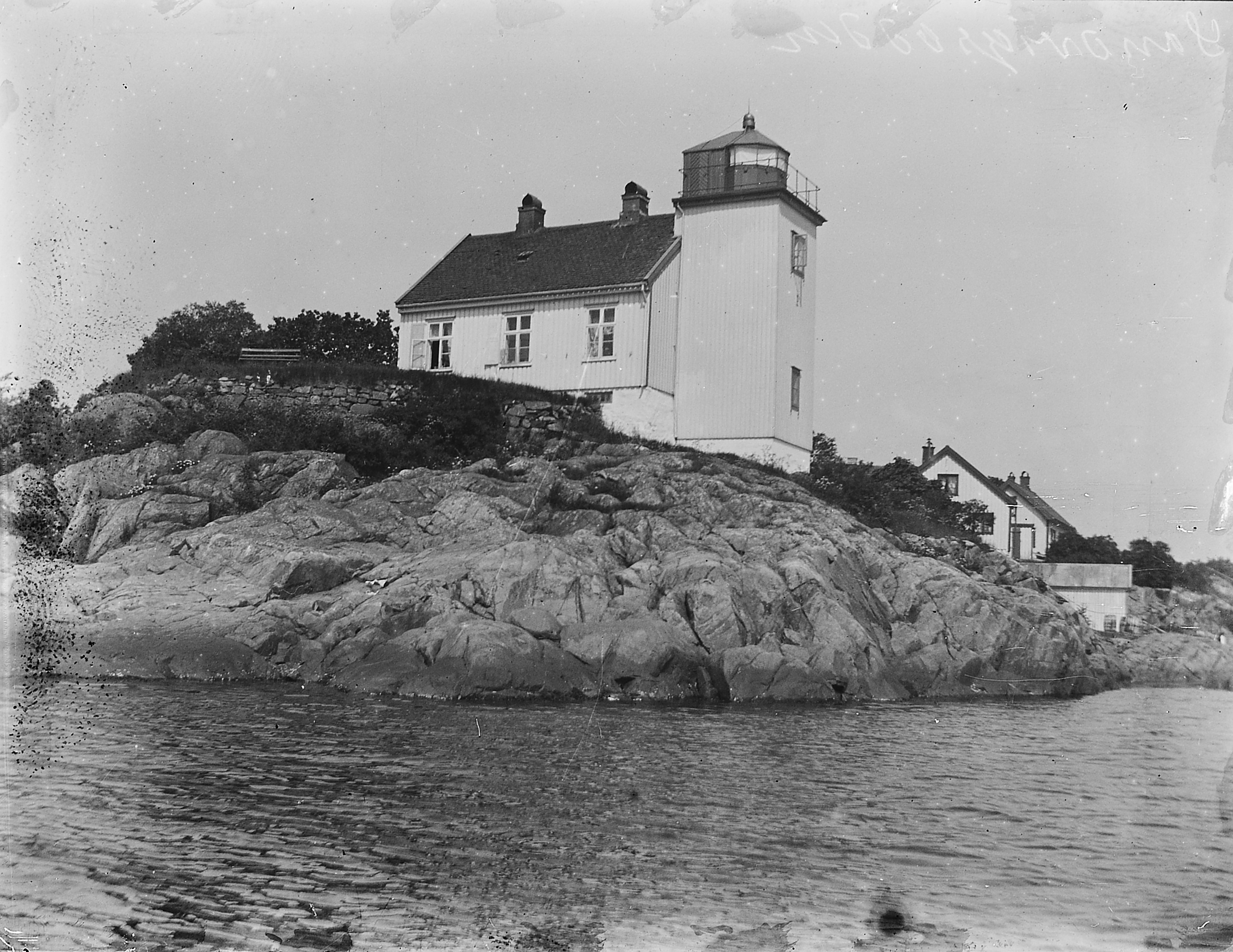
Another view of the old lighthouse (c. 1900)

== See also ==
- Lighthouses in Norway
- List of lighthouses in Norway
