= Heggholmen Lighthouse =

Coastal lighthouse in Oslo, Norway

Heggholmen Lighthouse Gressholmen
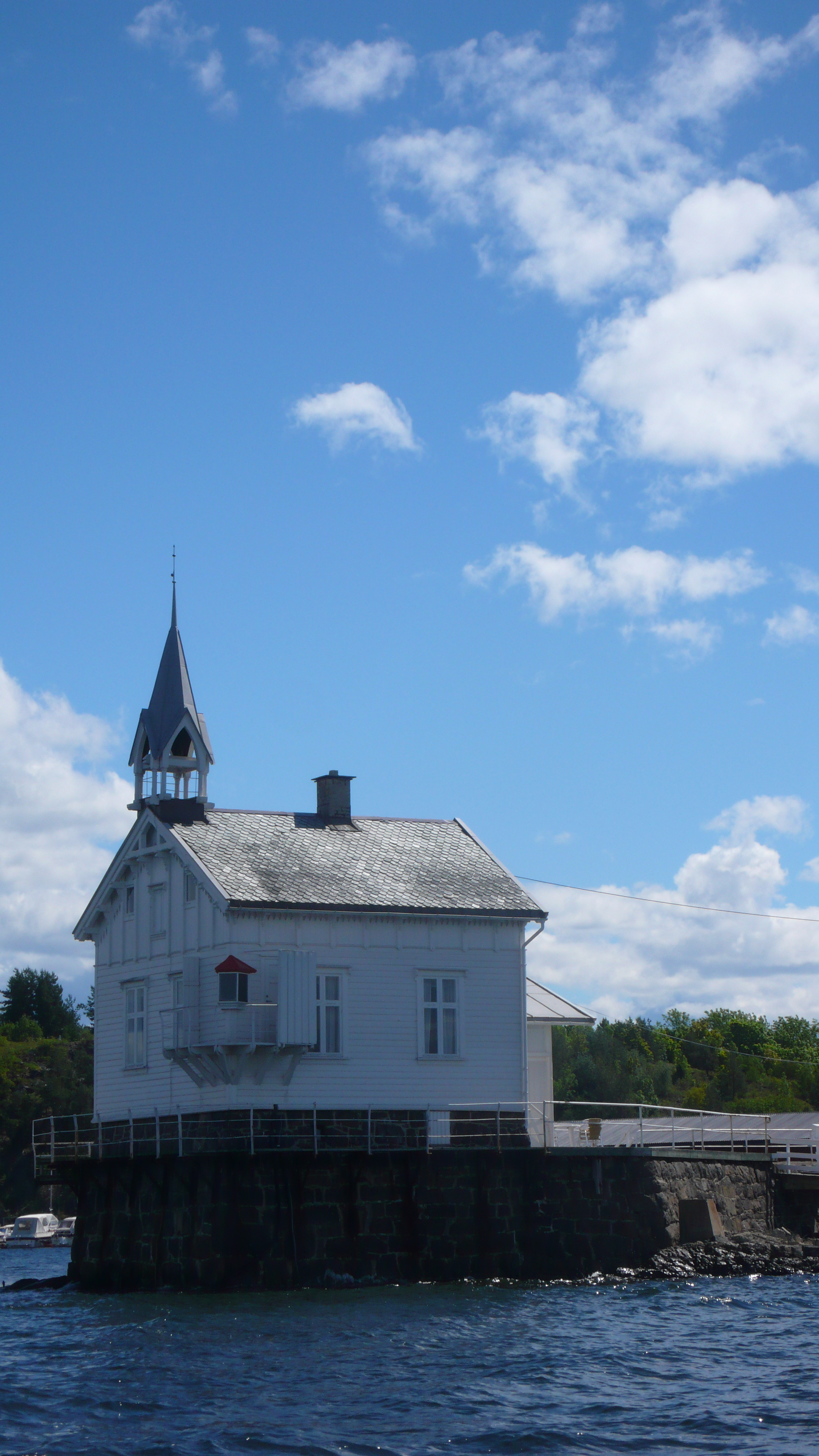
- Location: Oslo; Norway
- Coordinates: 59.885352°N 10.713724°E

Tower
- Constructed: 1827
- Construction: wooden building
- Automated: 1972
- Height: 15 metres (49 ft)
- Shape: small lantern placed at one corner the keeper's house
- Markings: white lighthouse, red lantern roof
- Operator: Oslo Havnevesen
- Heritage: heritage site in Norway

Light
- Focal height: 6 metres (20 ft)
- Lens: 6th order Fresnel lens
- Intensity: 775 cd
- Range: 9 nautical miles (17 km; 10 mi)
- Characteristic: Iso G 1s.

Heggholmen Lighthouse (Norwegian: Heggholmen fyr) is a coastal lighthouse located in the Oslofjord, in the municipality of Oslo, Norway.

The lighthouse was established in 1827, and today's building dates from 1876. Automated in 1959 and de-manned in 1972.

Heggholmen Lighthouse was listed as a protected site in 1998.

Read about it (in Norwegian) at their official internet site www.FYR.no/fyr/heggholmen-fyrstasjon

== See also ==
- Lighthouses in Norway
- List of lighthouses in Norway
