= Stavseng Lighthouse =

Lighthouse in Telemark, Norway

Stavseng Lighthouse Stavseng fyrstasjon
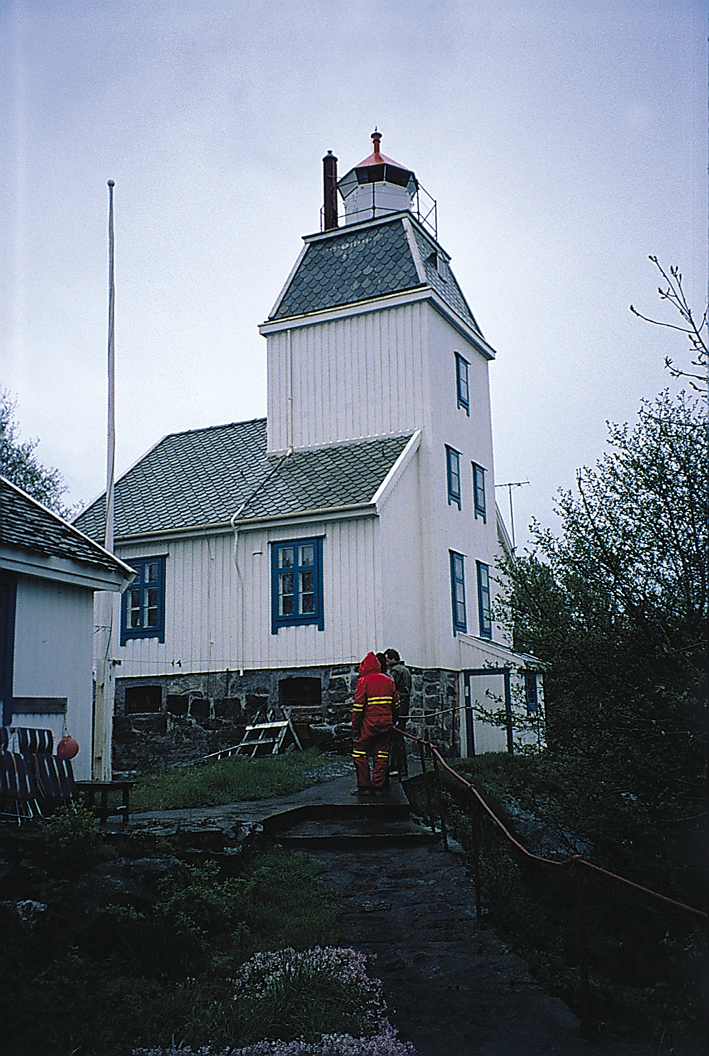
- View of the lighthouse
- Location of the lighthouse
- Location: Telemark, Norway
- Coordinates: 58°51′N 9°27′E

Tower
- Constructed: 1874
- Construction: Wooden
- Automated: 1968
- Height: 16.8 metres (55 ft)
- Shape: Square prism
- Markings: white tower, red lantern roof
- Heritage: cultural property

Light
- Focal height: 25.7 metres (84 ft)
- Intensity: 5,000 cd
- Range: Red: 5.7 nmi (10.6 km; 6.6 mi) Green: 5.3 nmi (9.8 km; 6.1 mi) White: 7.7 nmi (14.3 km; 8.9 mi)
- Characteristic: Oc(2) W 8s
- Norway no.: 053200

Stavseng Lighthouse (Norwegian: Stavseng fyrstasjon) is a coastal lighthouse in Kragerø Municipality in Telemark county, Norway. It was established in 1874, automated in 1968, and was listed as a protected site in 1997. The lighthouse is located on the western shore of the island of Skåtøy, marking the fjord leading to the town of Kragerø.

The lighthouse sits on top of a 17-metre (56 ft) tall square wooden tower above a 1-1/2 story wooden lighthouse keeper's house. The lighthouse was painted white with a red roof. The light sits at an elevation of 26 metres (85 ft) above sea level. The tower emits a white, red, or green light, depending on direction, occulting twice every 8 seconds.

== See also ==
- Lighthouses in Norway
- List of lighthouses in Norway
