= Barøy Lighthouse =

Lighthouse by the Ofotfjord, Norway

Barøy Lighthouse Barøy fyrstasjon
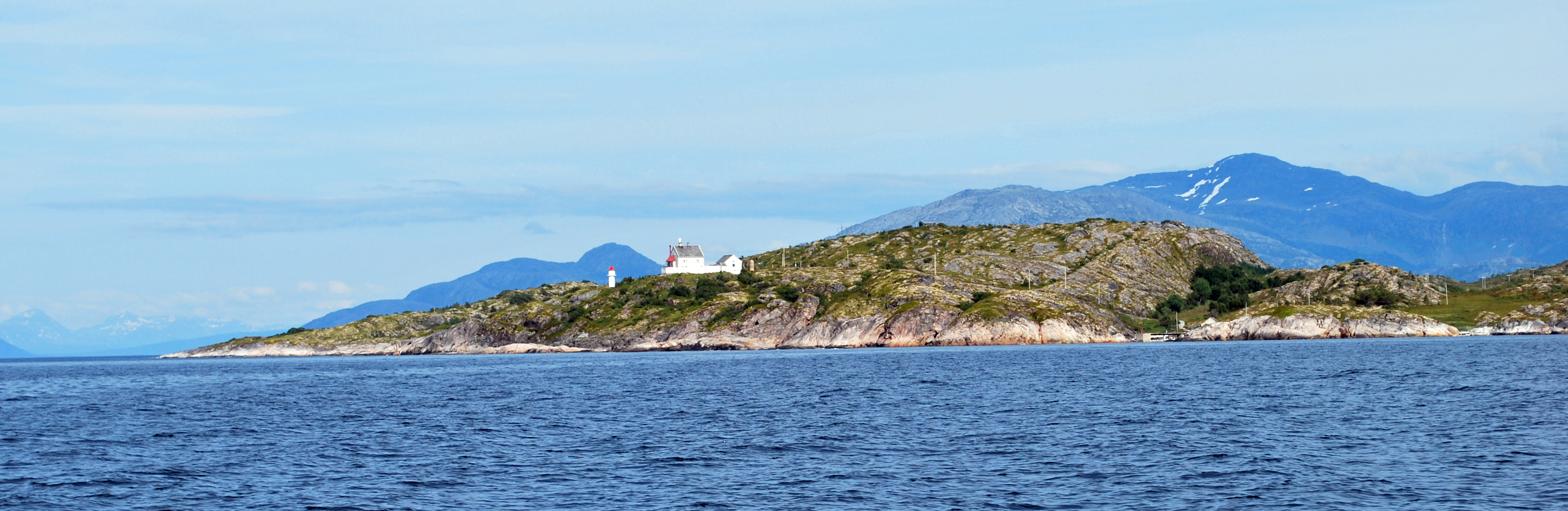
- View of the lighthouse
- Location of the lighthouse
- Location: Nordland, Norway
- Coordinates: 68°21′13″N 16°04′48″E

Tower
- Constructed: 1903
- Construction: concrete
- Automated: 1980
- Height: 7.3 metres (24 ft)
- Shape: cylindrical
- Markings: white with red top

Light
- Focal height: 27.5 metres (90 ft)
- Intensity: 55,800 candela
- Range: Red: 10 nmi (19 km; 12 mi) Green: 9.6 nmi (17.8 km; 11.0 mi) White: 12.6 nmi (23.3 km; 14.5 mi)
- Characteristic: Oc(2) WRG 8s
- Norway no.: 725100

Barøy Lighthouse (Norwegian: Barøy fyr) is a coastal lighthouse in Narvik Municipality in Nordland county, Norway. The lighthouse is located on the northwestern shore of the island of Barøya. It marks the entrance to the Ofotfjorden, which leads to the inland port of the town of Narvik.

== History ==
The first lighthouse here was built in 1903 and it began its work on 1 October 1903. The light was mounted on a concrete base and attached to the west end of a 1-story wooden lighthouse keeper's house.

In 1980, the lighthouse building was closed and a new automated light was built about 20 metres (66 ft) northeast of the old light. The 7.3-metre (24 ft) tall light sits at an elevation of 27.5 metres (90 ft) above sea level. The occulting light on top flashes red, white, or green depending on the direction from which it is viewed. The 55,800-candela light can be seen for up to 12.6 nautical miles (23.3 km; 14.5 mi). The light tower is white with a red top.

== See also ==
- Lighthouses in Norway
- List of lighthouses in Norway
