= Terningen Lighthouse =

Terningen Lighthouse Terningen fyrstasjon
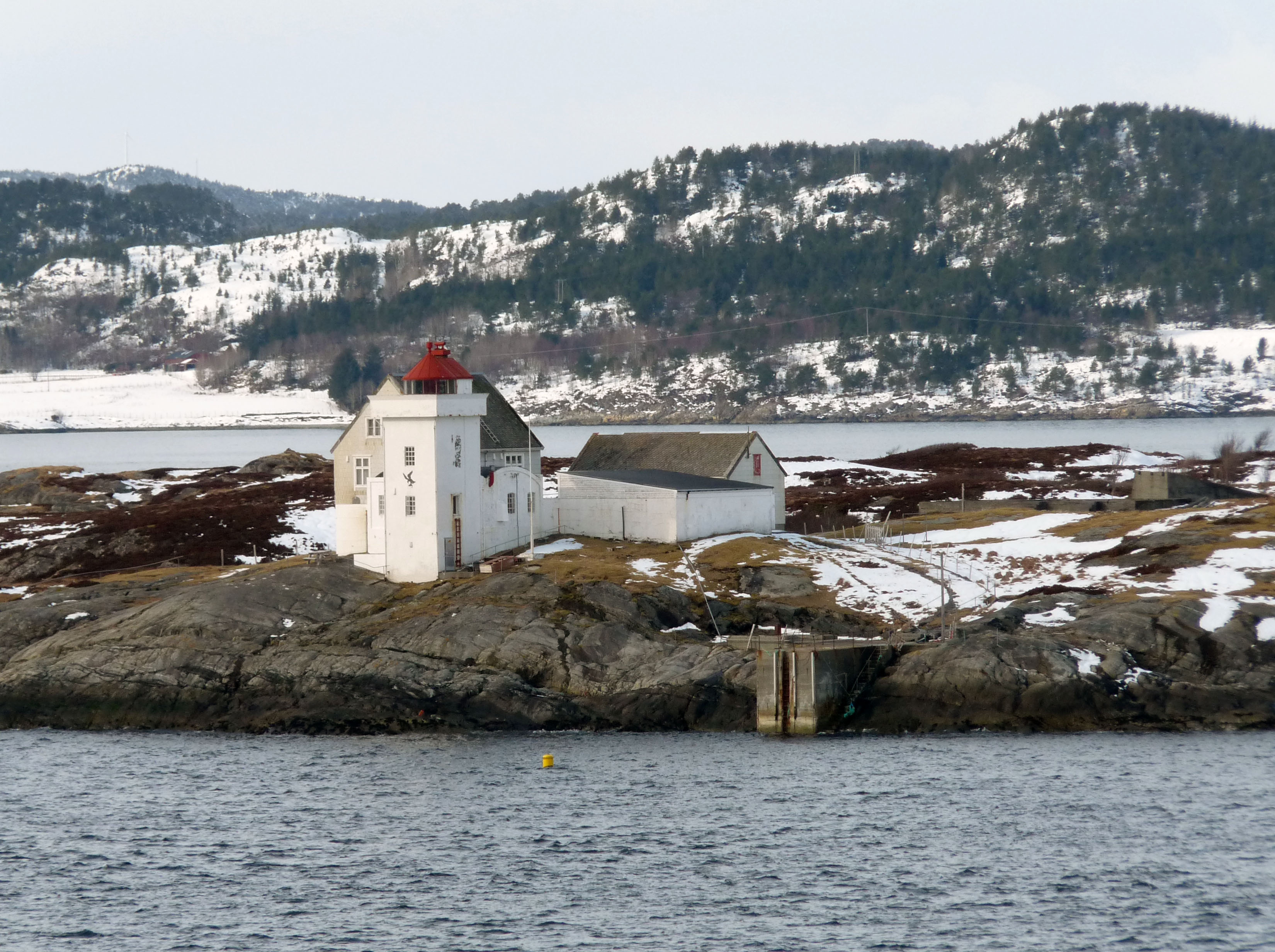
- View of the lighthouse
- Location: Trøndelag, Norway
- Coordinates: 63.4939°N 09.0394°E

Tower
- Constructed: 1833
- Construction: Concrete tower
- Automated: 1991
- Height: 12 metres (39 ft)
- Shape: Square
- Markings: White with red roof
- Fog signal: Horn

Light
- Focal height: 17.8 metres (58 ft)
- Intensity: 30,700 candelas
- Range: Red: 13 nmi (24 km; 15 mi) Green: 12 nmi (22 km; 14 mi) White: 13 nmi (24 km; 15 mi)
- Characteristic: Oc WRG 6s
- Norway no.: 407500

Terningen Lighthouse (Norwegian: Terningen fyr) is a lighthouse in Hitra Municipality in Trøndelag county, Norway. The lighthouse is located in the Trondheimsleia near the mouth of the Hemnfjorden, just west of the island of Hemnskjela, and about 4 kilometres (2.5 mi) southwest of the village of Sandstad. The light marks one of the main channels that leads to the Trondheimsfjorden.

The 12-metre (39 ft) tall lighthouse has an occulting light that flashes white, red, and green (depending on direction) once every six seconds at an elevation of 17.8 metres (58 ft) above sea level. The concrete tower is painted white and it has a red roof. The 30,700-candela light can be seen for up to 13 nautical miles (24 km; 15 mi). The light is activated from July 21 until May 16 each year. The light is inactive and unnecessary during the late spring and early summer due to the midnight sun.

== See also ==
- List of lighthouses in Norway
- Lighthouses in Norway
