= Tennholmen Lighthouse =

Coastal lighthouse in Norway

Tennholmen Lighthouse Tennholmen fyrstasjon
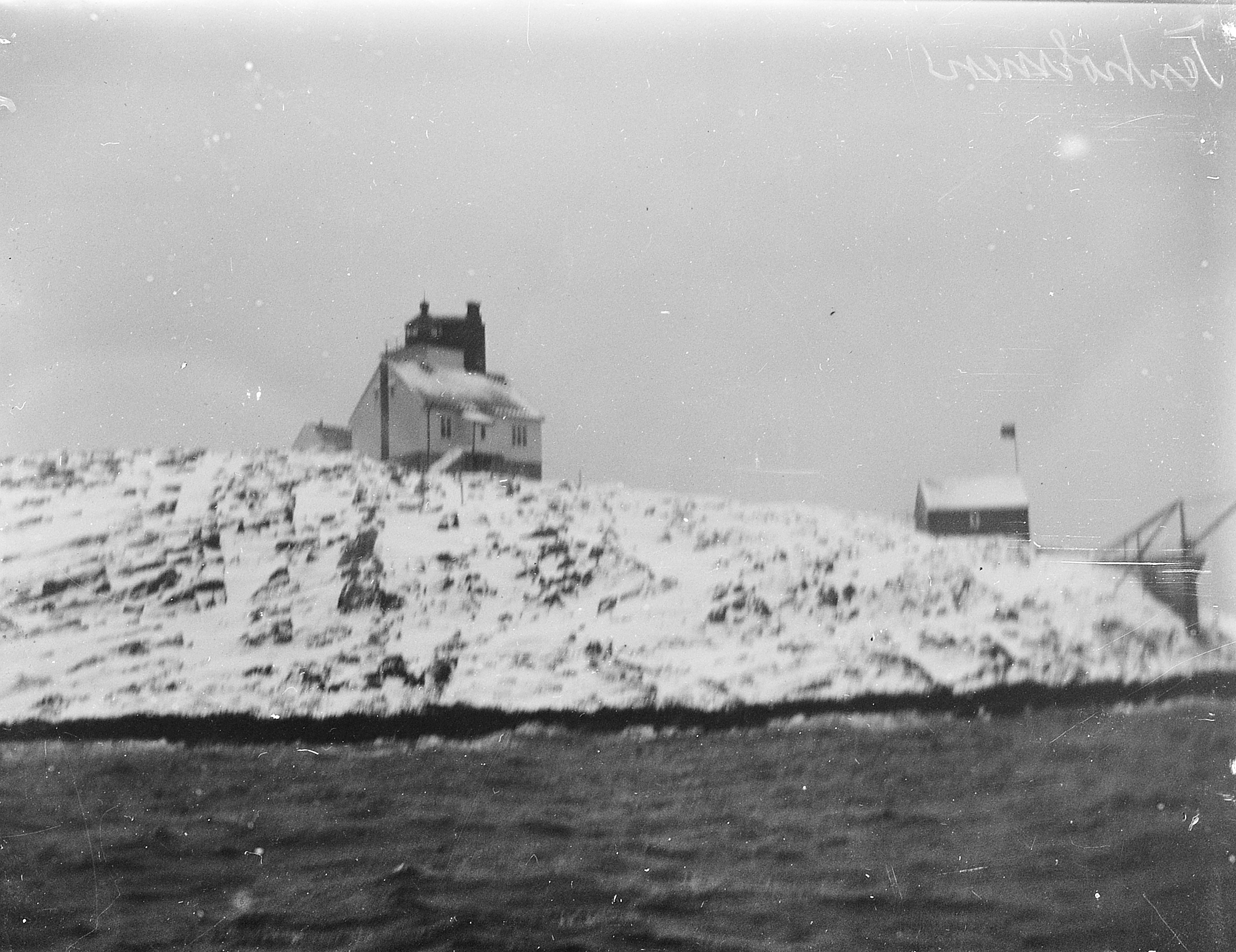
- View of the lighthouse
- Location of the lighthouse
- Location: Nordland, Norway
- Coordinates: 67°18′N 13°30′E

Tower
- Constructed: 1 October 1901
- Construction: wooden
- Automated: 1988
- Height: 14.4 metres (47 ft)
- Shape: square tower on the keeper's house roof
- Markings: white tower, red top
- Racon: N

Light
- Focal height: 27.3 metres (90 ft)
- Intensity: 487,600 candela
- Range: 15.5 nmi (28.7 km; 17.8 mi)
- Characteristic: Fl W 30s
- Norway no.: 700000

Tennholmen Lighthouse (Norwegian: Tennholmen fyr) is a coastal lighthouse in Bodø Municipality in Nordland county, Norway. It is located in the Vestfjorden on one of the Tennholman islands, just west of the Givær islands, about 32 kilometres (20 mi) due west of the town of Bodø.

The 14.4-metre (47 ft) tall light is mounted on the roof of a 1 1/2-story wood house where the keeper lived. The lighthouse is painted white and the light tower is red. The light sits at an elevation of 27.3 metres (90 ft) above sea level. The white light flashes once every 30 seconds. The 487,600-candela light can be seen for up to 15.5 nautical miles (28.7 km; 17.8 mi). The light is active from dusk to dawn from 4 August until 2 May each year. The light is inactive during the summers due to the midnight sun in the region.

== See also ==
- Lighthouses in Norway
- List of lighthouses in Norway
