= Gullholmen Lighthouse =

Coastal lighthouse in Moss, Norway

Gullholmen Lighthouse Guldholmen fyr
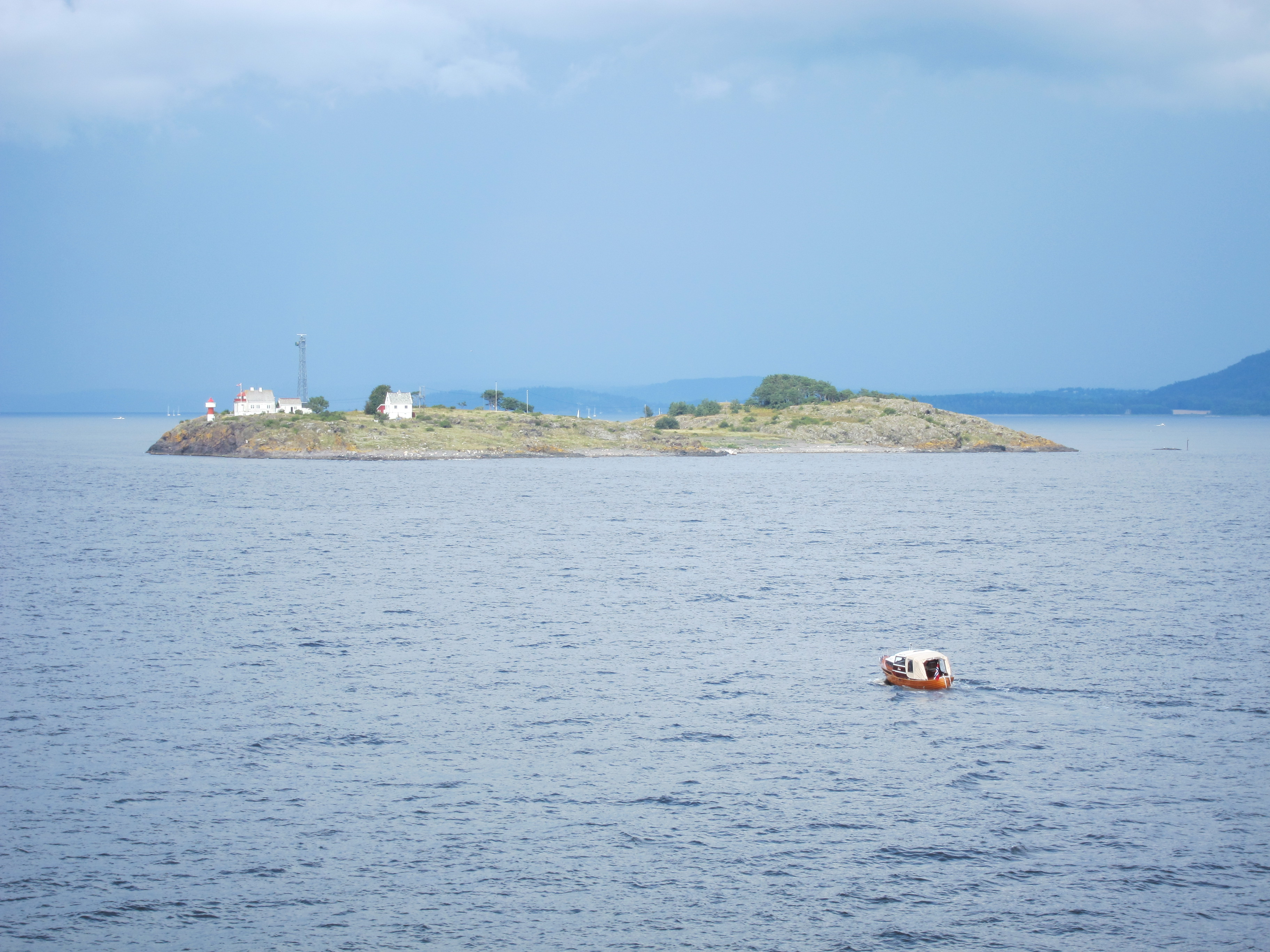
- Location: Moss; Østfold; Norway
- Coordinates: 59.435278°N 10.576667°E

Tower
- Constructed: 1894 (first)
- Construction: wooden tower (first) concrete tower (current)
- Automated: 1984
- Height: 7 metres (23 ft) (first and current)
- Shape: square tower with balcony and lantern (first) cylindrical tower with balcony and small lantern (current)
- Markings: whire tower, red lantern (first) white tower with a red band, red lantern roof (current)
- Operator: Stiftelsen Gamle Guldholmen Fyr

Light
- First lit: 1984 (current)
- Deactivated: 1984 (first)
- Focal height: 16 metres (52 ft) (current)
- Characteristic: Oc WRG 6s.

Gullholmen Lighthouse (Norwegian: Gullholmen fyr) is a coastal lighthouse in the municipality of Moss in Østfold, Norway. The lighthouse is located in the outer Oslofjord, off the island Jeløya. It was established in 1894, and replaced by a light in 1984.

== See also ==
- List of lighthouses in Norway
- Lighthouses in Norway
