= Tvistein Lighthouse =

Coastal lighthouse in Norway

Tvistein Lighthouse Tvistein fyr
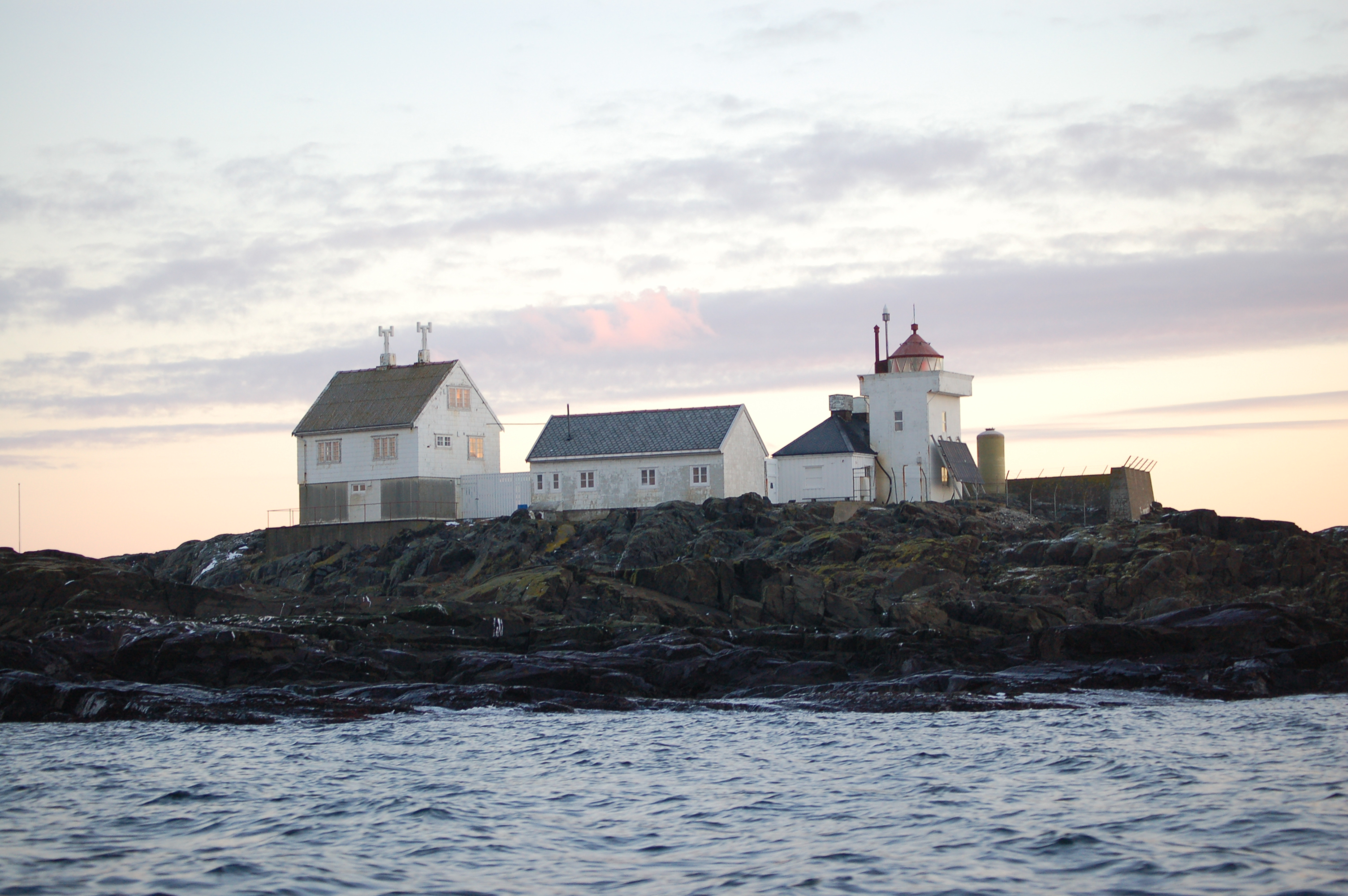
- Location: Larvik, Norway
- Coordinates: 58°56′18″N 9°56′11″E

Tower
- Constructed: 1908
- Construction: masonry
- Automated: 1988
- Height: 12 m (39 ft)
- Shape: square
- Markings: white (tower), red (lantern)

Light
- Focal height: 17 m (56 ft)
- Intensity: 26,100 candela
- Range: 13.2 nmi (24.4 km; 15.2 mi)
- Characteristic: Fl WRG 5s

Tvistein Lighthouse (Norwegian: Tvistein fyr) is a coastal lighthouse in Larvik Municipality in Vestfold county, Norway. The lighthouse is located on the island of Tvistein, about 5 kilometres (3.1 mi) to the southeast of the village of Nevlunghavn, near the entrance to the Langesundsfjorden. It was first lit in 1908, and was automated in 1988.

== Gallery ==
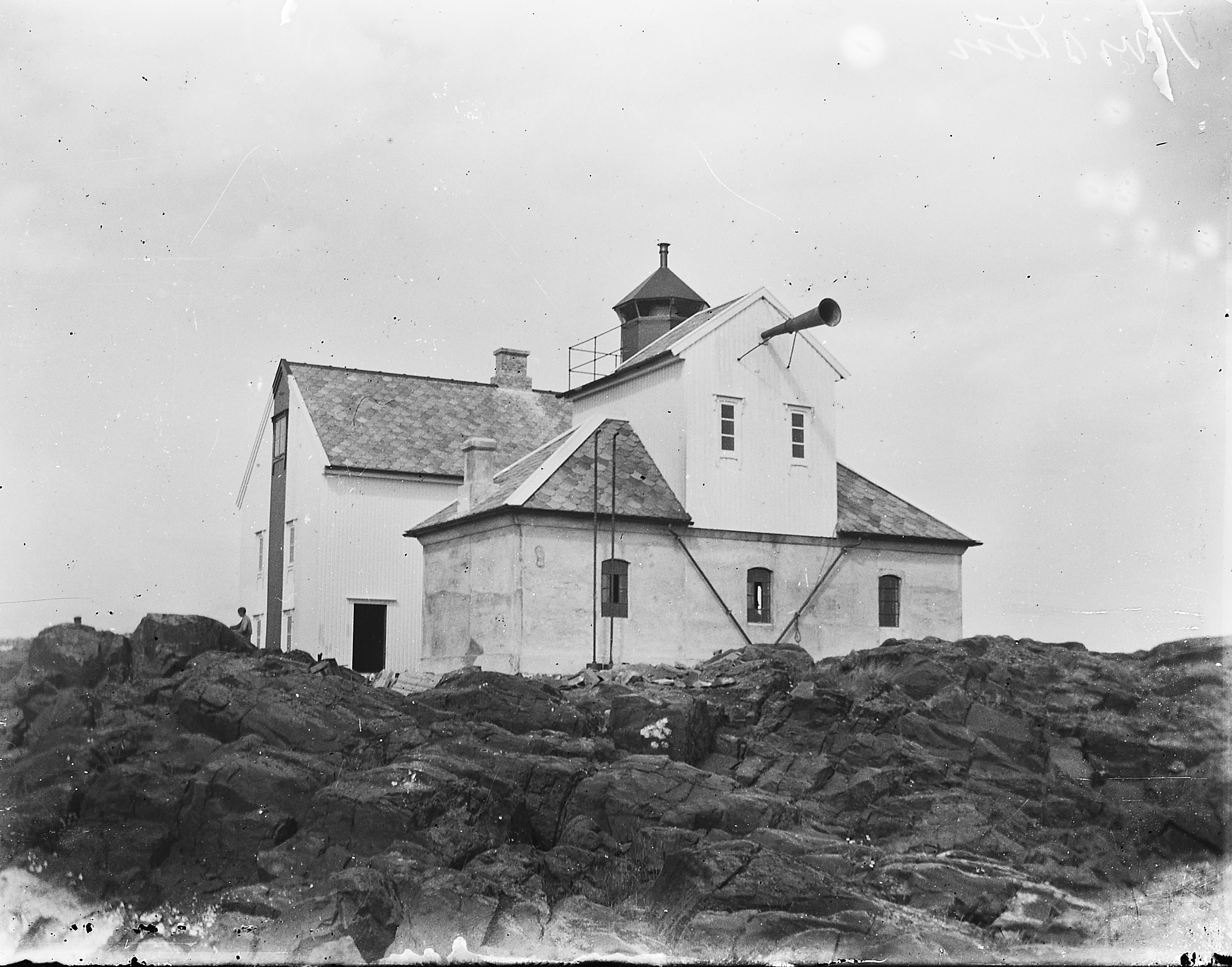
Up until 1951 the Tvistein lantern room and the foghorn were sat on top of the machine house roof.

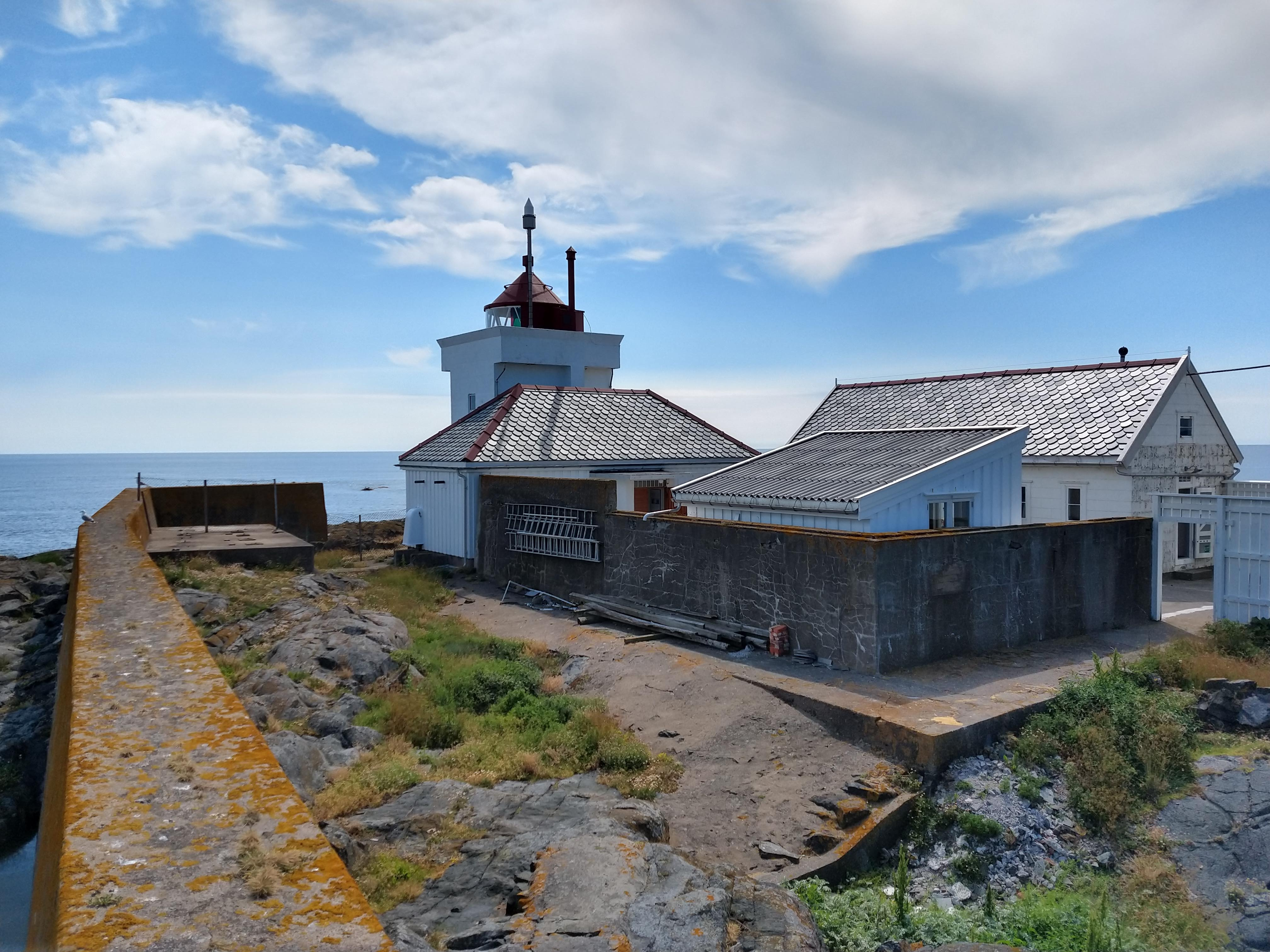
On the east side of the Tvistein lighthouse station a massive wall offers protection from the waves.

== See also ==
- List of lighthouses in Norway
- Lighthouses in Norway
