= Flatøy Lighthouse =

Coastal lighthouse in Norway

Flatøy Lighthouse Flatøy fyrstasjon
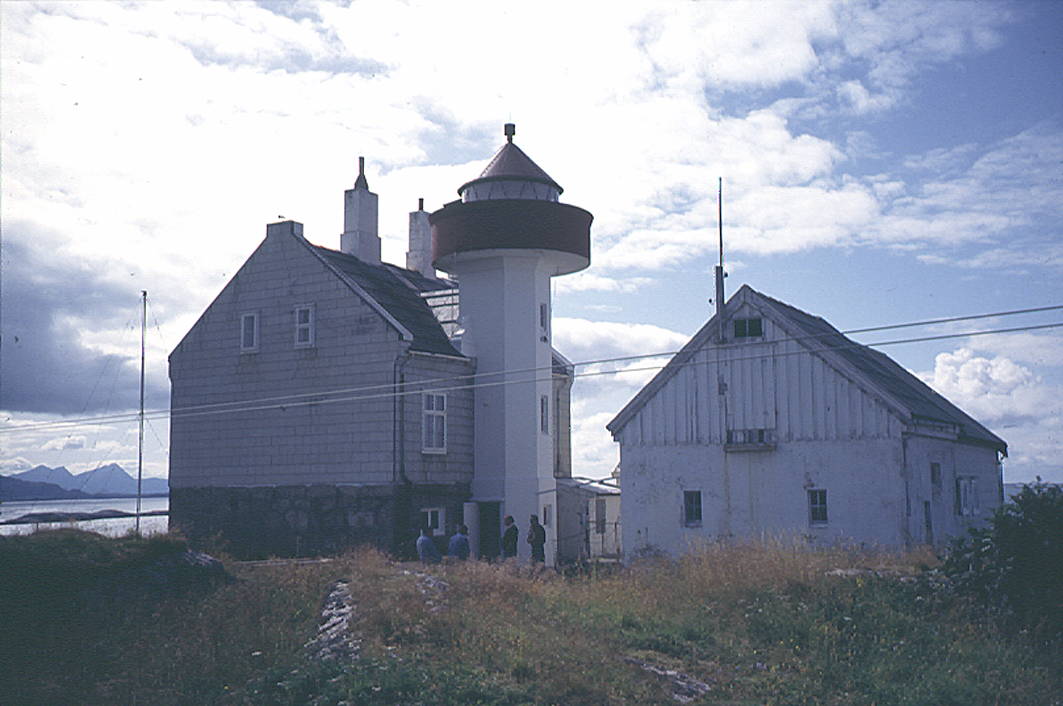
- Location: Nordland, Norway
- Coordinates: 67°55′16″N 14°45′58″E

Tower
- Constructed: 1882
- Construction: Concrete
- Automated: 2006
- Height: 6.7 metres (22 ft)
- Markings: White with red top
- Heritage: cultural heritage preservation in Norway

Light
- First lit: 2006
- Focal height: 44 metres (144 ft)
- Range: Red: 5.9 nmi (10.9 km; 6.8 mi); Green: 5.5 nmi (10.2 km; 6.3 mi); White: 8 nmi (15 km; 9.2 mi)
- Characteristic: Fl WR 5s
- Norway no.: 714500

Flatøy Lighthouse (Norwegian: Flatøy fyrstasjon) is a coastal lighthouse in Steigen Municipality in Nordland county, Norway. The lighthouse is located on the island of Store Flatøya on the southeastern part of the Vestfjorden.

== History ==
The first lighthouse was built here in 1882. That building was torn down and replaced in 1966. The original lighthouse keeper's house is still standing and the 1966 tower is attached to the house. The tower is about 16 metres (52 ft) tall with an octagonal concrete tower that is white with a red roof. The new 1966 light was also automated. This lighthouse was decommissioned in 2006 when a new much smaller light tower was built about 100 metres (330 ft) north of the old lighthouse station. The new 7-metre (23 ft) tall concrete tower has a light that sits at an elevation of 44 metres (144 ft) above sea level. This light has a red or white flash (depending on direction) every five seconds.

== See also ==
- Lighthouses in Norway
- List of lighthouses in Norway
