= Stabben Lighthouse =

Coastal lighthouse in Kinn, Norway

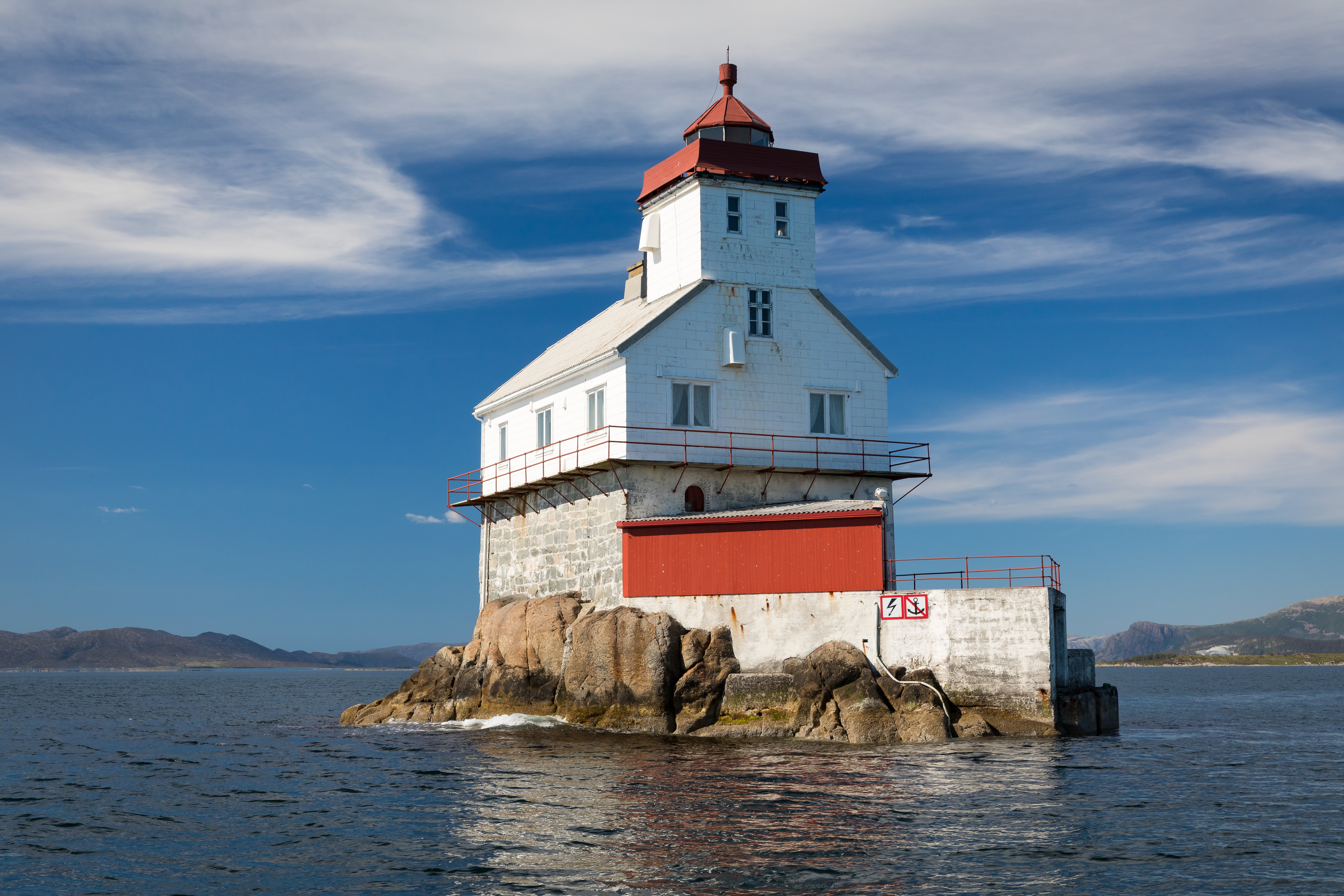
- Stabben Lighthouse outside Florø.
- Location: Kinn Municipality; Vestland county Norway
- Coordinates: 61°36′N 4°58′E

Tower
- Constructed: 1867
- Construction: masonry
- Automated: 1975
- Height: 10 m (33 ft)
- Shape: square tower on roof of keeper's house
- Markings: white tower, red balcony and lantern
- Operator: Sogn og Fjordane Fylkeskommune
- Heritage: cultural property

Light
- First lit: 1905
- Focal height: 16 m (52 ft)
- Lens: 4th order Fresnel lens
- Intensity: 5,000 candela
- Range: 6.6 nmi (12.2 km; 7.6 mi)
- Characteristic: Oc(3) WRG 10s

Stabben Lighthouse (Norwegian: Stabben fyr) is a coastal lighthouse located in Kinn Municipality in Vestland county, Norway. The lighthouse sit on top of a tiny, 300-square-metre (3,200 sq ft), rocky island in the fjord, about 3 kilometres (1.9 mi) northwest of the town of Florø.

== History ==
It was established in 1867, renovated and upgraded in 1905, and automated in 1975. It was listed as a protected site in 1999.

The 16-metre (52 ft) tall square masonry tower rises from the seaward end of a 2 1/2-story masonry lighthouse keeper's house. The 4th order Fresnel lens (installed in 1905) remains in use. At the top of the tower, there is a white, red, or green light (depending on direction) that is occulting three times every 10 seconds.

== See also ==
- Lighthouses in Norway
- List of lighthouses in Norway
