= Norwegian Coastal Administration =

Norwegian agency for maritime administration

- Company type: Government agency
- Industry: Water transport infrastructure
- Founded: 1974
- Headquarters: Ålesund, Norway
- Area served: Norway
- Parent: Norwegian Ministry of Fisheries and Coastal Affairs
- Website: www.kystverket.no

Norwegian Coastal Administration (Norwegian: Kystverket) is a Norwegian government agency responsible for the water transport infrastructure along the 9,200-kilometre (5,700 mi) Coast of Norway. It is responsible for coastal navigation infrastructure, pilotage and harbour and port infrastructure, including lighthouses. The agency is led by the Coastal Directorate (Kystdirektoratet) and is subordinate to the Ministry of Fisheries and Coastal Affairs. The main office is in Ålesund.

It has 1100 employees.

== History ==
The administration was created in 1974 when the Norwegian Directorate of Harbours, Naval Pilot Authority and the Norwegian Coastal Navigation Administration were merged. It took its present name in 1981, after it had been reorganised into five regional offices, located in Arendal, Haugesund, Ålesund, Kabelvåg, and Honningsvåg. In 2002 the head office was moved from Oslo to Ålesund and in 2006 the construction division, Secora, was demerged and became a separate limited company owned by the Ministry of Trade and Industry. The maritime radio service is provided by Telenor Maritime Radio.

In 2002, the agency was moved from Oslo to Ålesund, along with six other directorates and inspectorates, in a program initialized by Victor Norman, Minister of Government Administration and Reform of the Conservative Party. It cost 729 million Norwegian krone (NOK) to move the seven agencies. An official report from 2009 concluded that the agencies had lost 75 to 90% of their employees, mostly those with long seniority, and that for a while critical functions for society were dysfunctional. No costs reductions had been made, there was no significant impact on the target area, and there was little impact on the communication between the agencies and the ministries. In a 2010 report, Professor Jarle Trondal concluded that none of the agencies had become more independent after the move, despite this being one of the main arguments from the minister. Norman successor, Heidi Grande Røys of the Socialist Left Party, stated that the moving had had an important symbolic effect on the target areas, and that she did not see the lack of advantages as a reason to not move similar agencies later.
