= Anda =

Anda or ANDA may refer to:

== Places ==
=== China ===
- Anda, Heilongjiang, a city in Heilongjiang, China
- Anda railway station, a railway station in Anda, China

=== Iran ===
- Anda, Iran, a village in Fars Province, Iran

=== Norway ===
- Anda, Norway, an island in Øksnes municipality, Nordland county, Norway
- Anda lighthouse, a lighthouse in Anda, Norway

=== Philippines ===
- Anda, Bohol, a municipality in Bohol province, Philippines
- Anda, Pangasinan, an island municipality in Pangasinan province, Philippines

== People ==
- Anda Upīte (born 2000), Latvian luger
- Altan Khan, Mongolian khan whose given name was Anda
- Anda (singer), South Korean singer
- Anda (surname)
- Anda, lugal (king) of Lagash, an ancient Sumerian city-state

== Other ==
- Aṇḍa, a concept in Kaśmir Śaivism
- Abbreviated New Drug Application (ANDA)
- Asociación Nacional de Actores (ANDA) or National Association of Actors, the Mexican actors guild
- Anda, The term exist in Old Turkic: ant ičmek ("to take an oath"), The Turkic term, if it is not a loanword in Middle Mongol, is related to Mongol anda. a Mongolian term for friends and allies who are "as though born from the same womb," i.e., “blood brothers." The term is also a word for "friend" in the Mongolian language
- Anda (play), a 2008 Israeli play
- Australasian Numismatic Dealers Association
