= Rivingen Lighthouse =

Coastal lighthouse in Norway

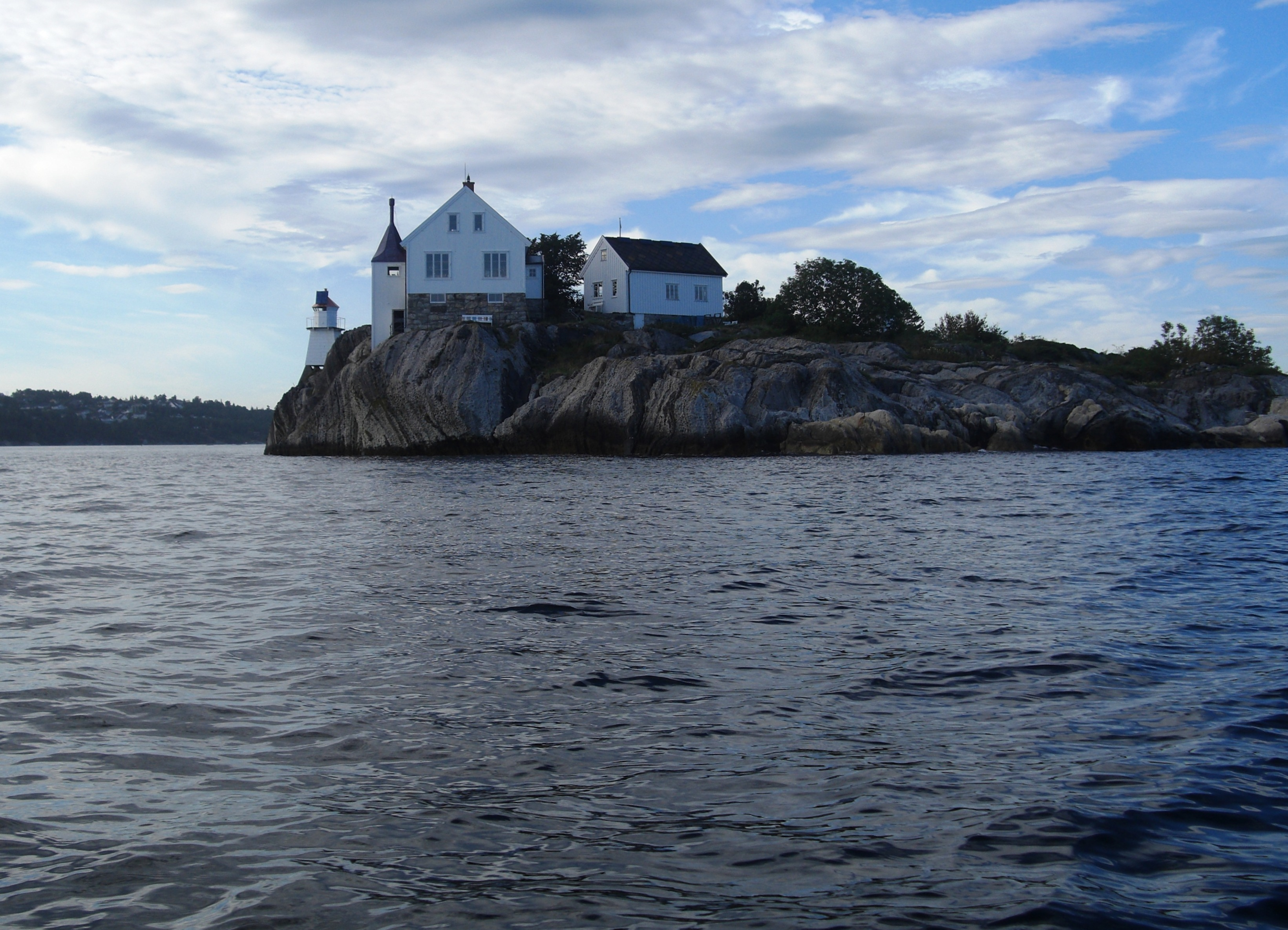
- View of the lighthouse
- Location: Rivingen, Grimstad, Norway
- Coordinates: 58°18′13″N 8°34′59″E

Tower
- Constructed: 1886, 1925
- Construction: Wood
- Height: 6 m (20 ft)
- Shape: Square tower
- Markings: White with red top

Light
- First lit: 1886
- Focal height: 12 m (39 ft)
- Range: 6.4 nmi (11.9 km; 7.4 mi)
- Characteristic: Fl WRG 5s
- Norway no.: 065100

Rivingen Lighthouse (Norwegian: Rivingen fyrstasjon) is a coastal lighthouse in Grimstad Municipality in Agder county, Norway. The lighthouse was first established in 1886 on a small island at the southern approach to the harbour of the town of Grimstad. The original lighthouse had an attached keeper's house, but in 1925 that lighthouse tower was closed and a new, much smaller tower was built about 23 metres (75 ft) to the north-northwest of the old tower.

The light sits at an elevation of 12 metres (39 ft) above sea level on top of a 6-metre (20 ft) tall white, square, wooden tower with a red top. The light emits a flash of light every 5 seconds. The light is white, red, or green depending on the direction. The lights can be seen for up to 6.4 nautical miles (11.9 km; 7.4 mi).

== History ==
The original 1886 tower has been inactive since 1925. The white, square tower was about 8 metres (26 ft) tall with a sharply pyramidal dark maroon, metallic roof and a spire. The tower is attached to the front of a one and a half story keeper's house. The old tower and house are now a privately owned summer residence which is only accessible by boat.

== See also ==
- Lighthouses in Norway
- List of lighthouses in Norway
