= Lighthouses in Norway =

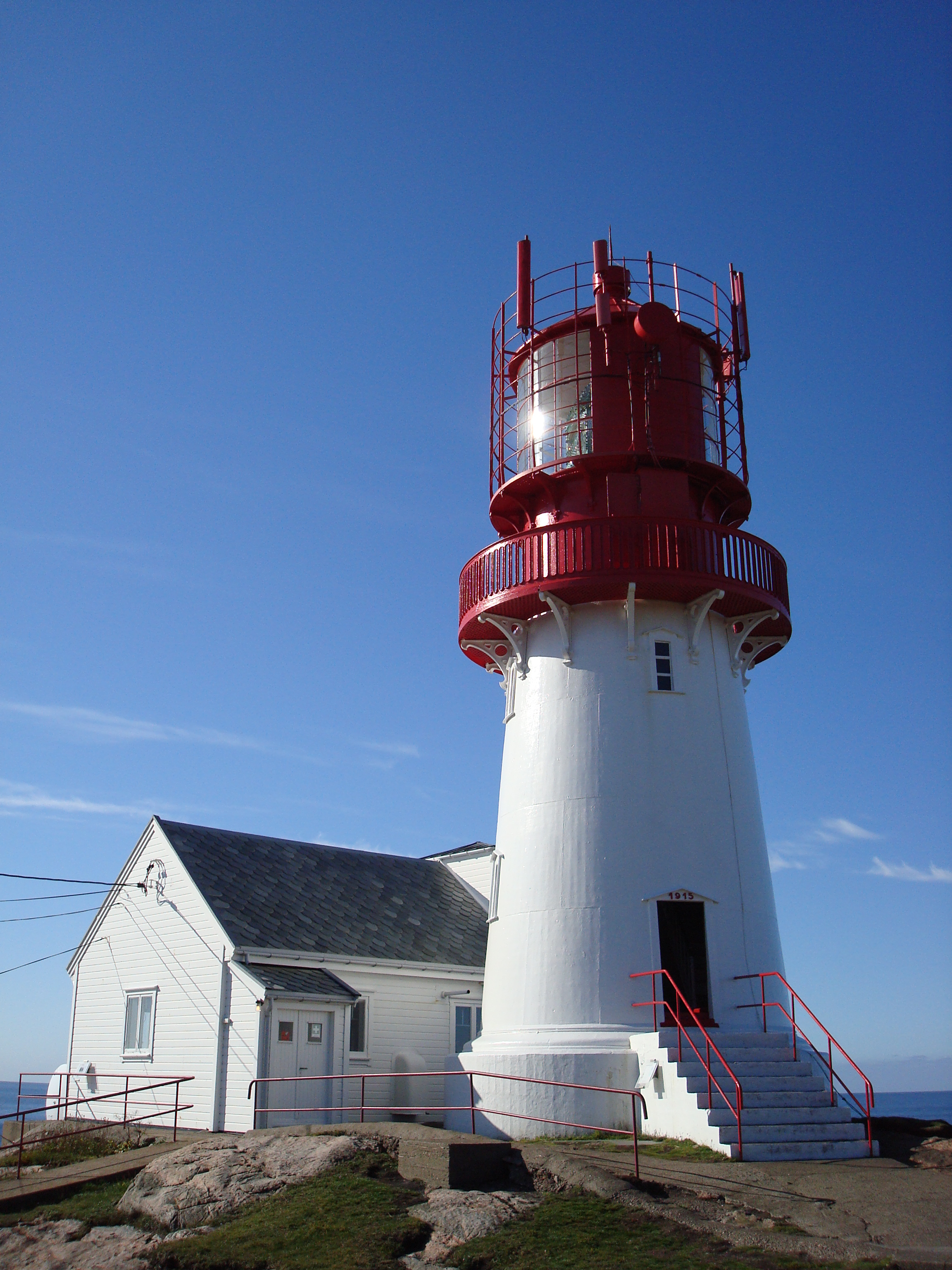
Lindesnes Lighthouse

The coast of Norway is 100,915 kilometres (62,706 mi) long and there have been a total of 212 lighthouses along it, but no more than 154 have ever been operational at the same time. The first, Lindesnes Lighthouse, opened in 1655; the newest Lighthouse, Anda Lighthouse, was finished in 1932.

The first lighthouses were private operations, but in 1821 the government made the Channel and Harbor Inspector responsible for lighthouses in Norway. A dedicated Lighthouse Administration was set up in 1841. The lighthouses are today mostly automated and since 1974, run by the Norwegian Coastal Administration.

Two lightvessels had been operated along the Norwegian coast. "Enigheden" off Ålesund from 1856 was replaced with Lepsøyrev Lighthouse in 1879, and "Ildjernsflu" moored off Nesodden from 1914 until it was scrapped in 1968.

This list, while not complete, is sorted by location along the shipping lane from the border with Sweden in the south to Russia in the northeast. The Norwegian Coastal Administration maintains a total of 5,000 different navigational lights along the coast. This list covers only lighthouse stations.

== Gallery: Norwegian lighthouses by county (fylke) ==
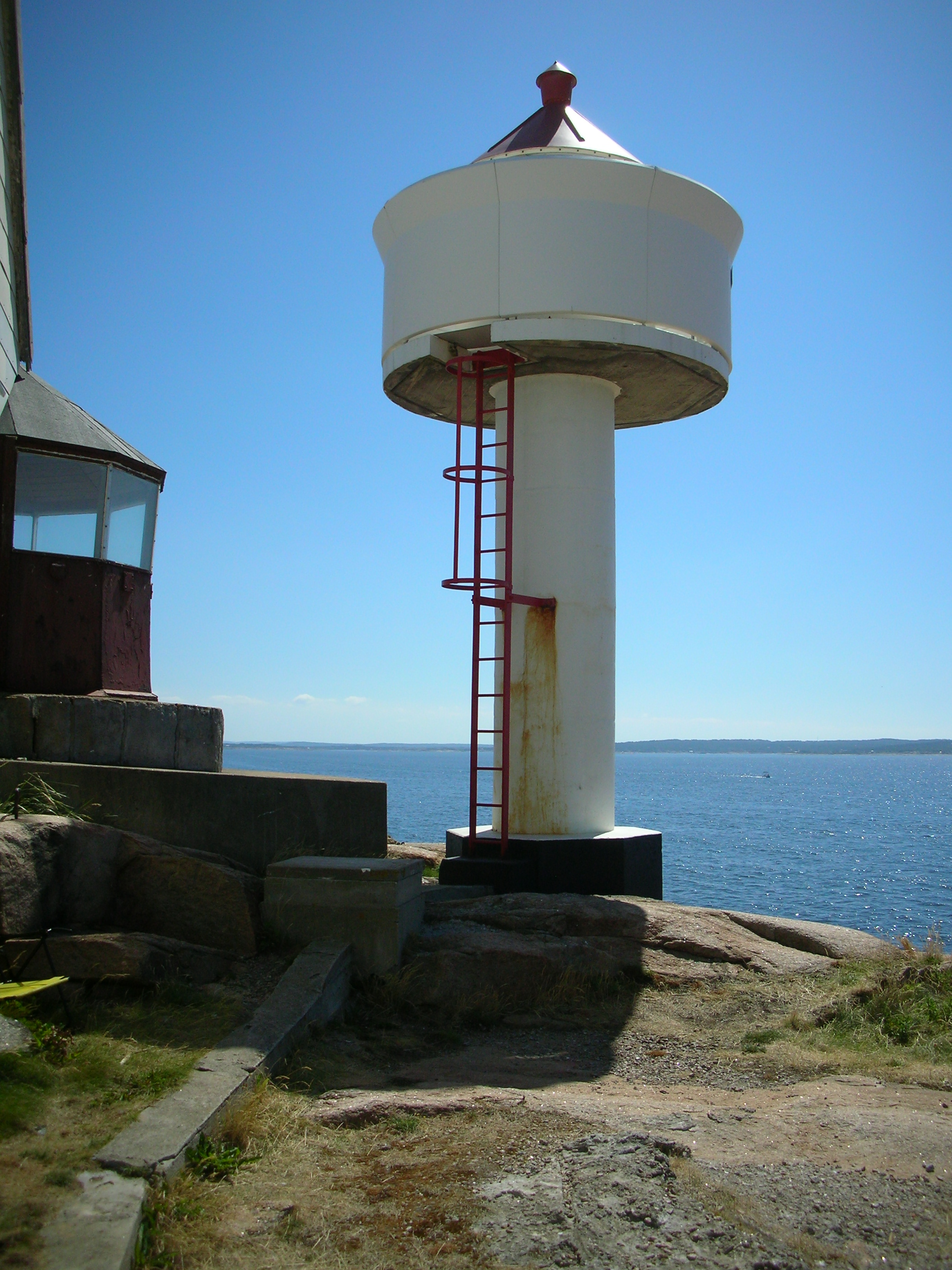
Strømtangen Lighthouse in Østfold County

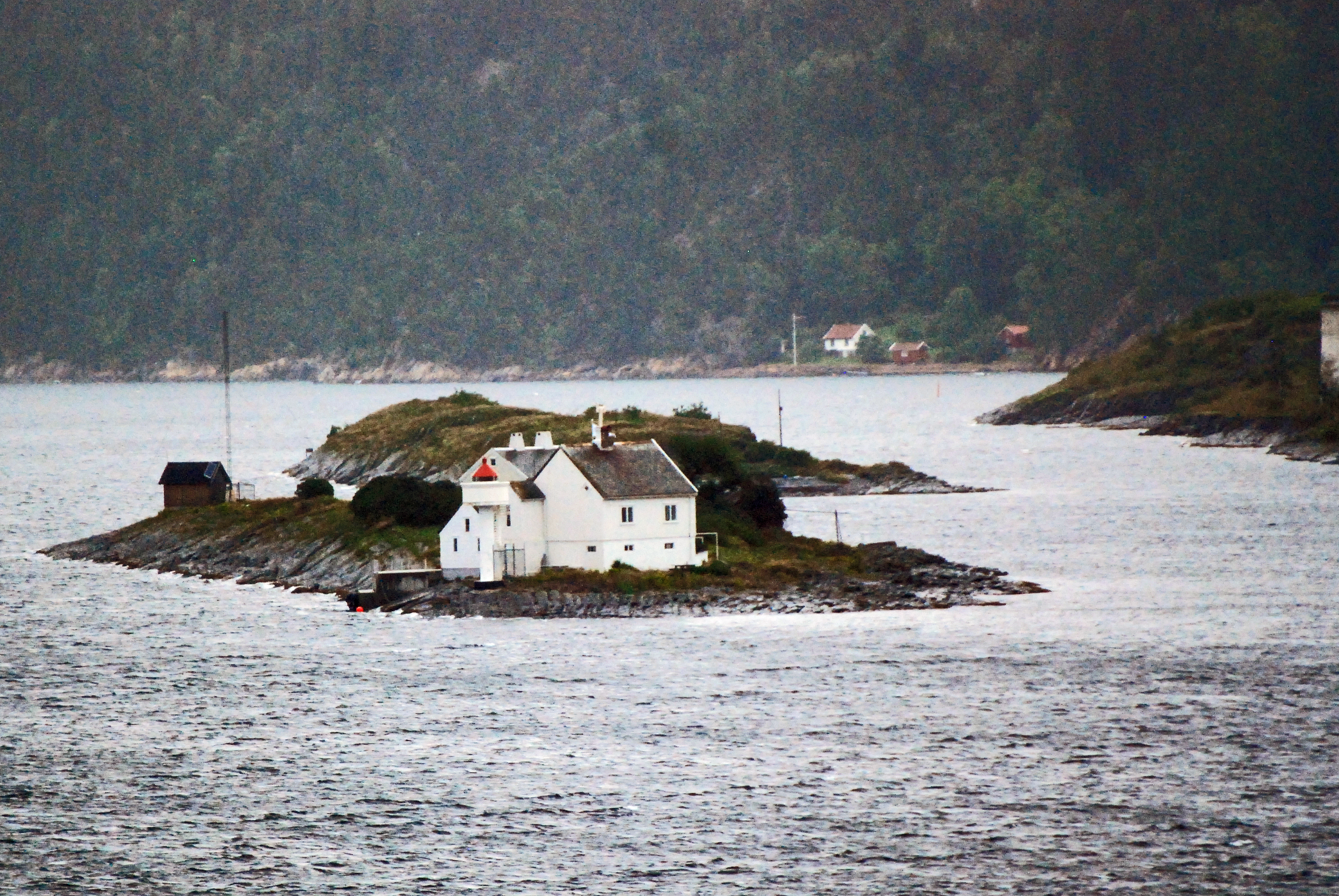
Steilene Lighthouse off Nesodden in Akershus County

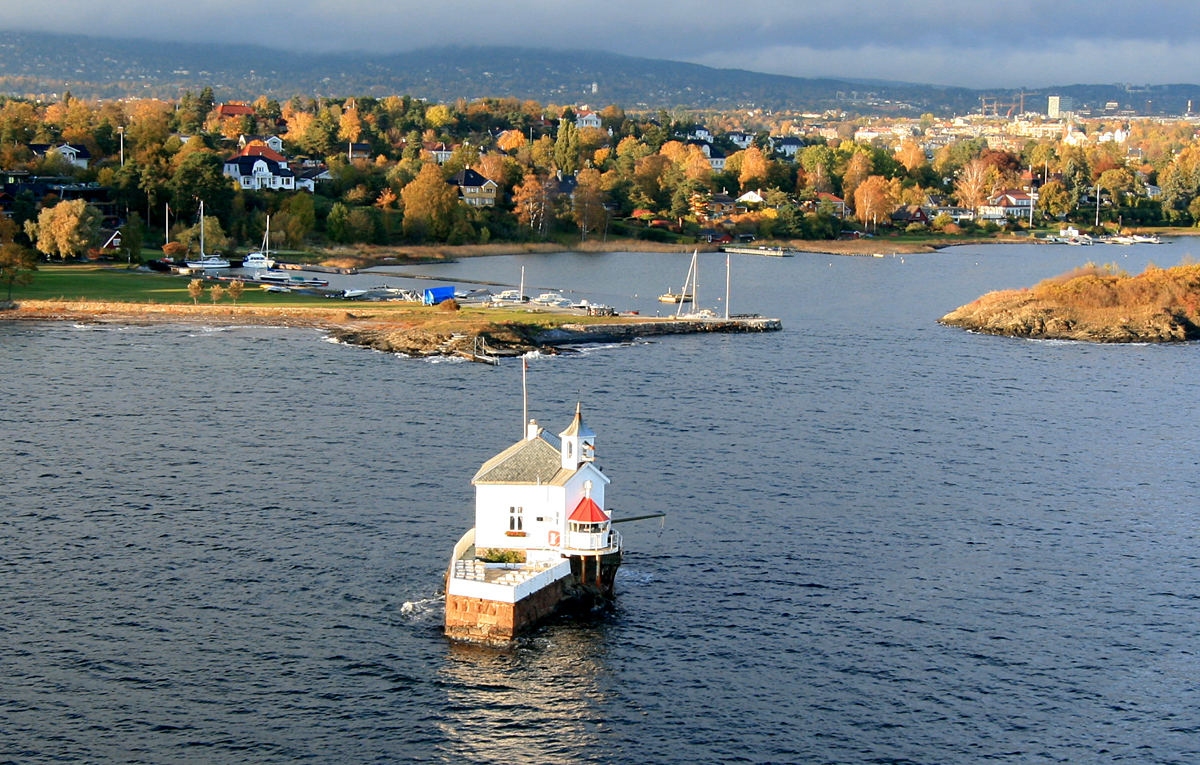
Dyna Lighthouse off Oslo

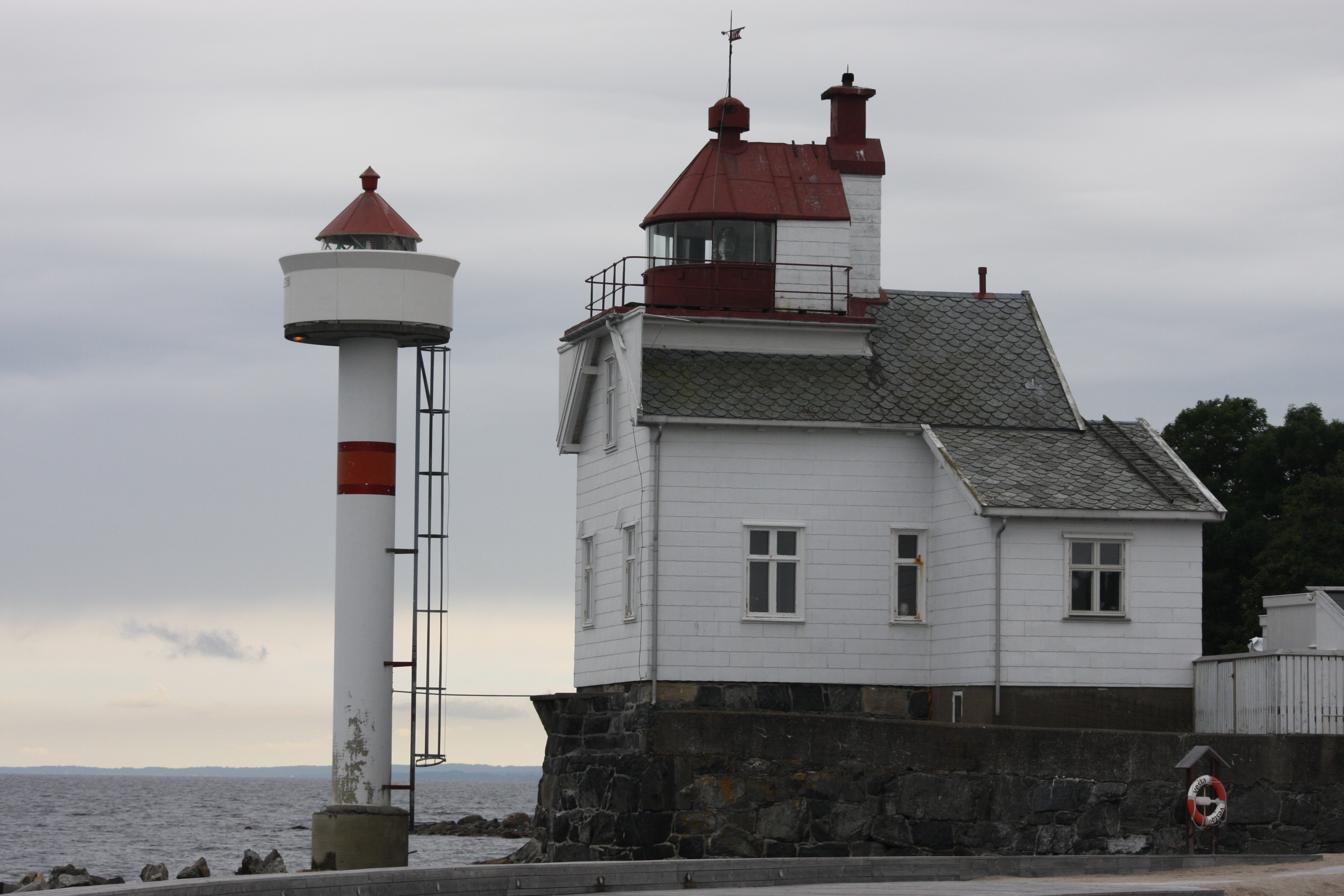
Filtvet Lighthouse in Buskerud County

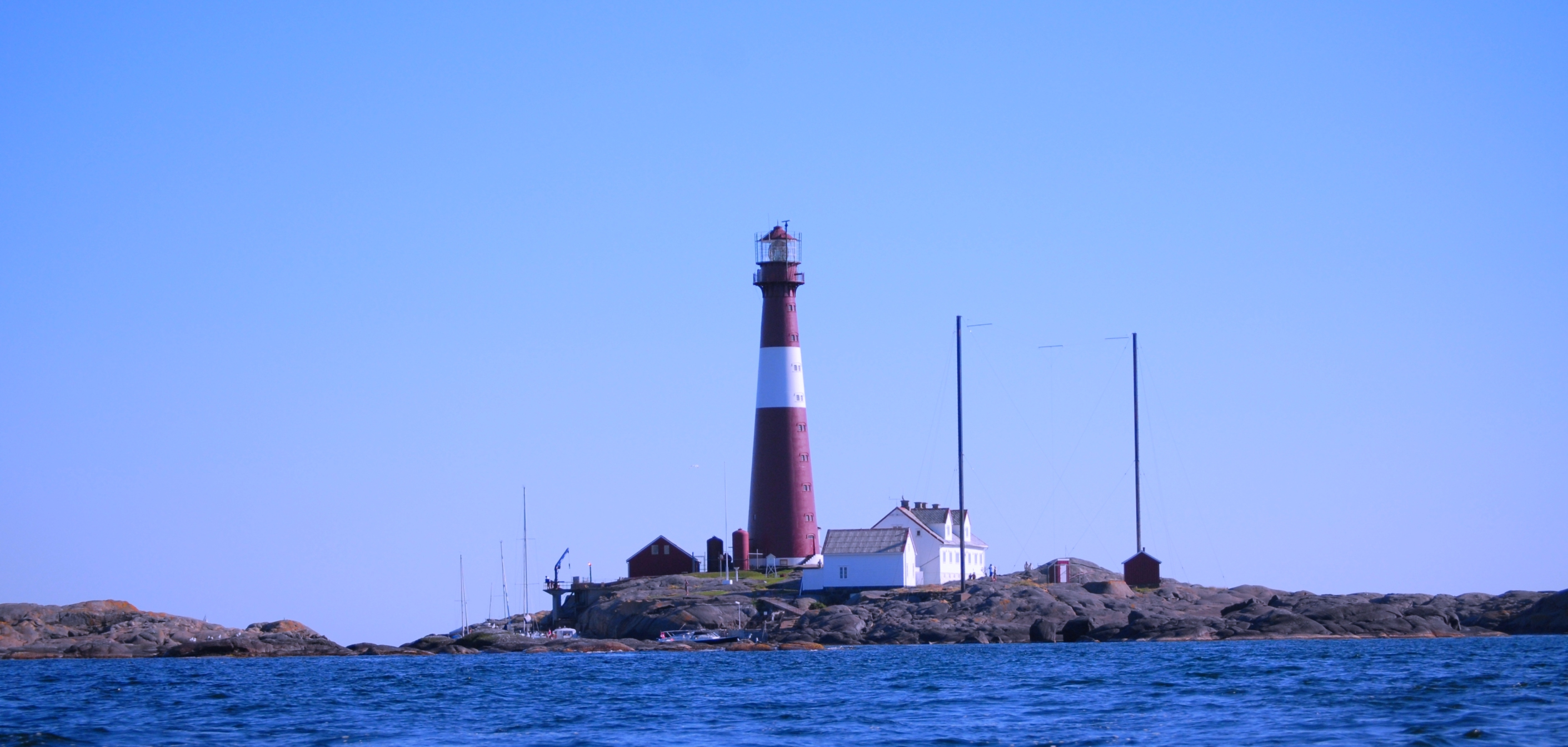
Færder Lighthouse in Vestfold County

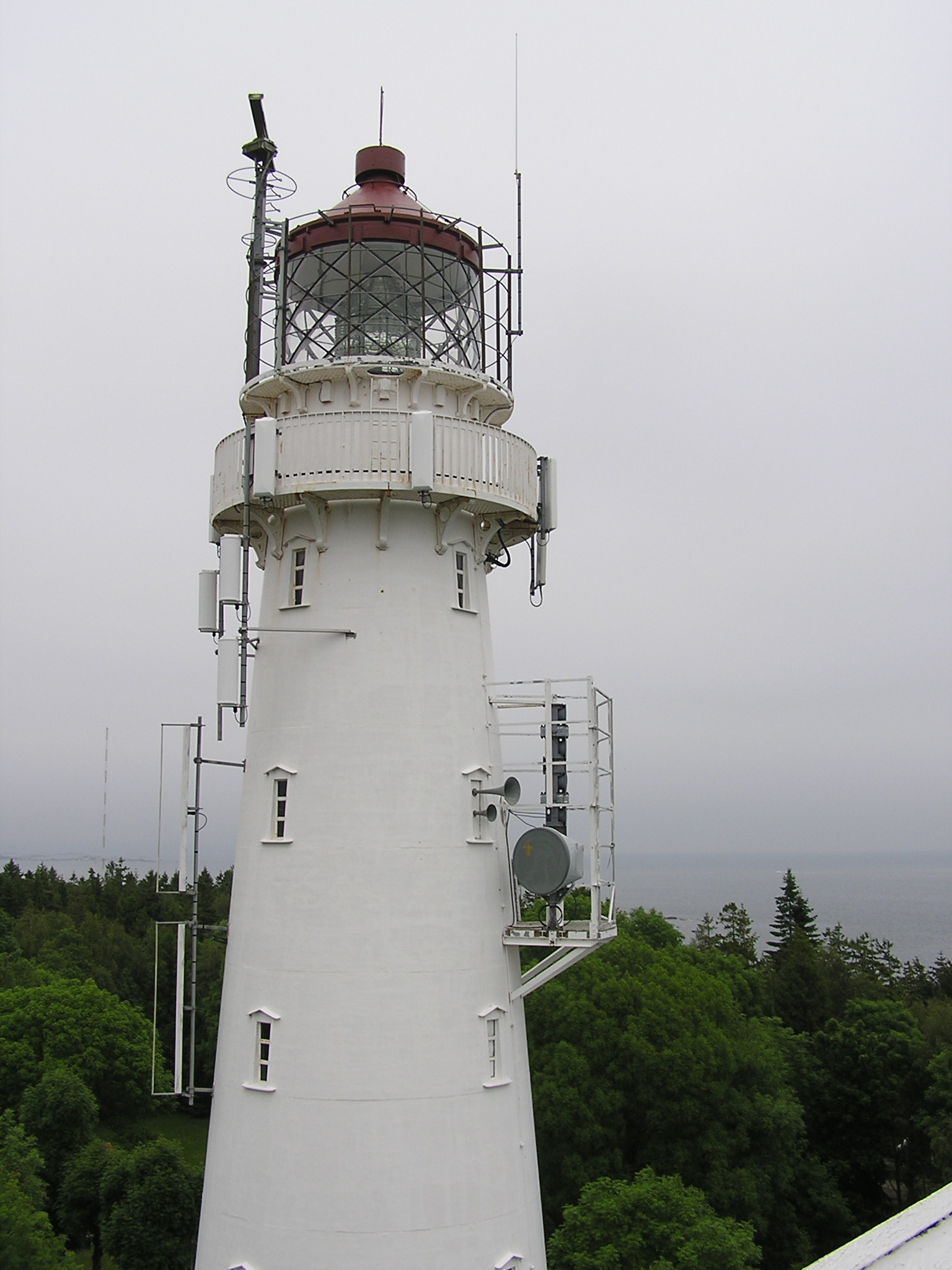
Jomfruland Lighthouse in Telemark County

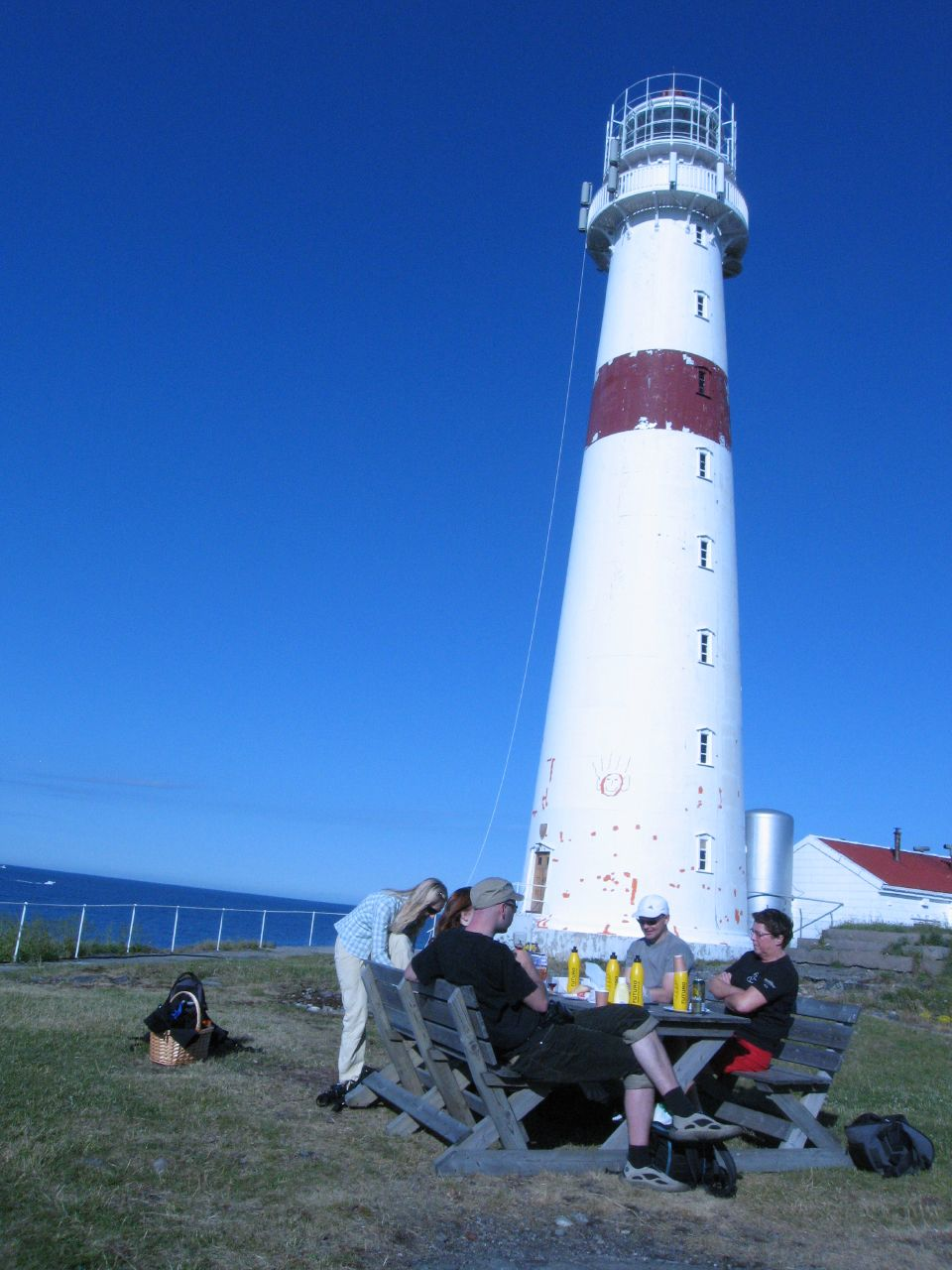
Store Torungen Lighthouse in Agder County

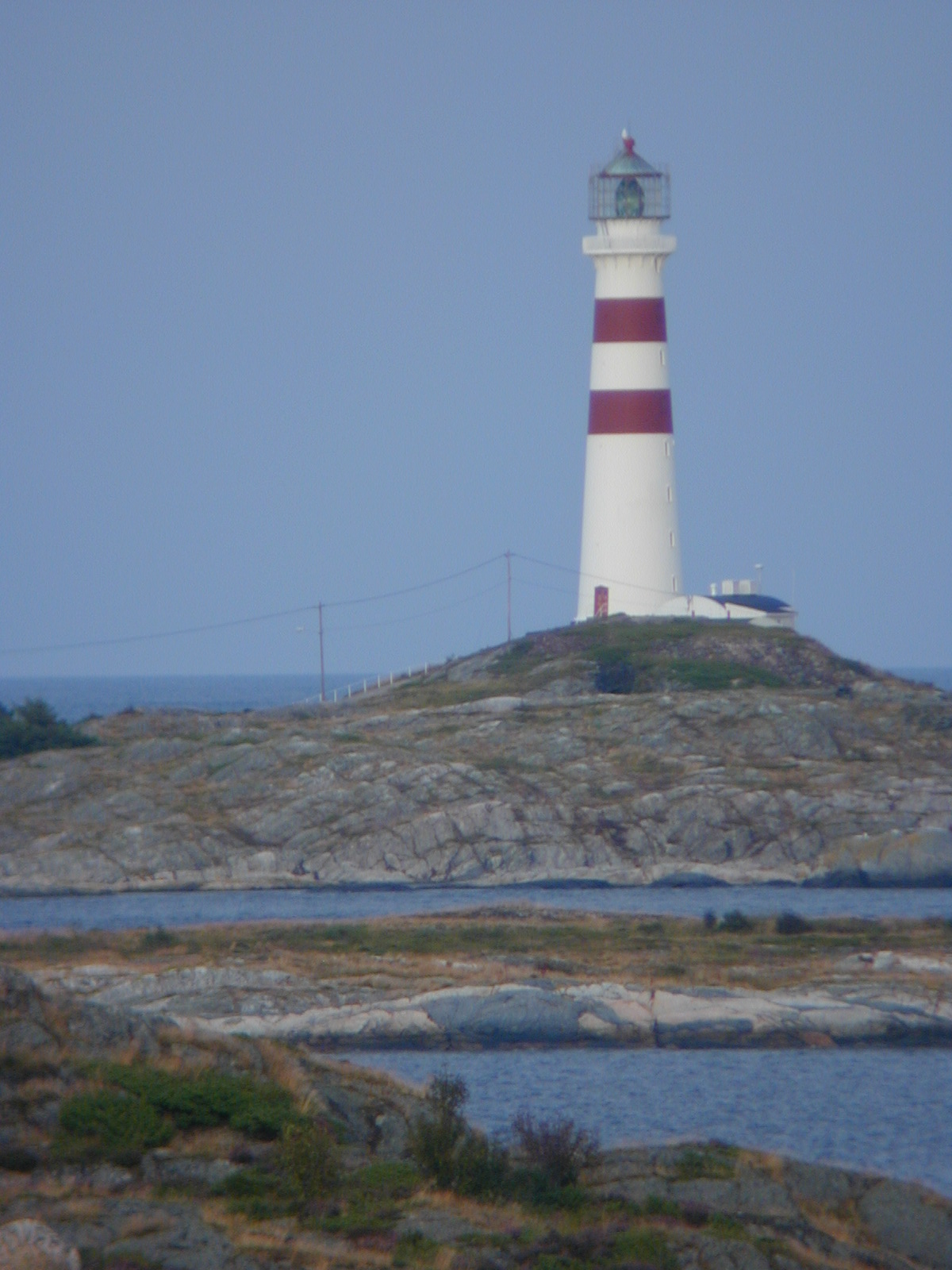
Oksøy Lighthouse off Kristiansand in Agder County

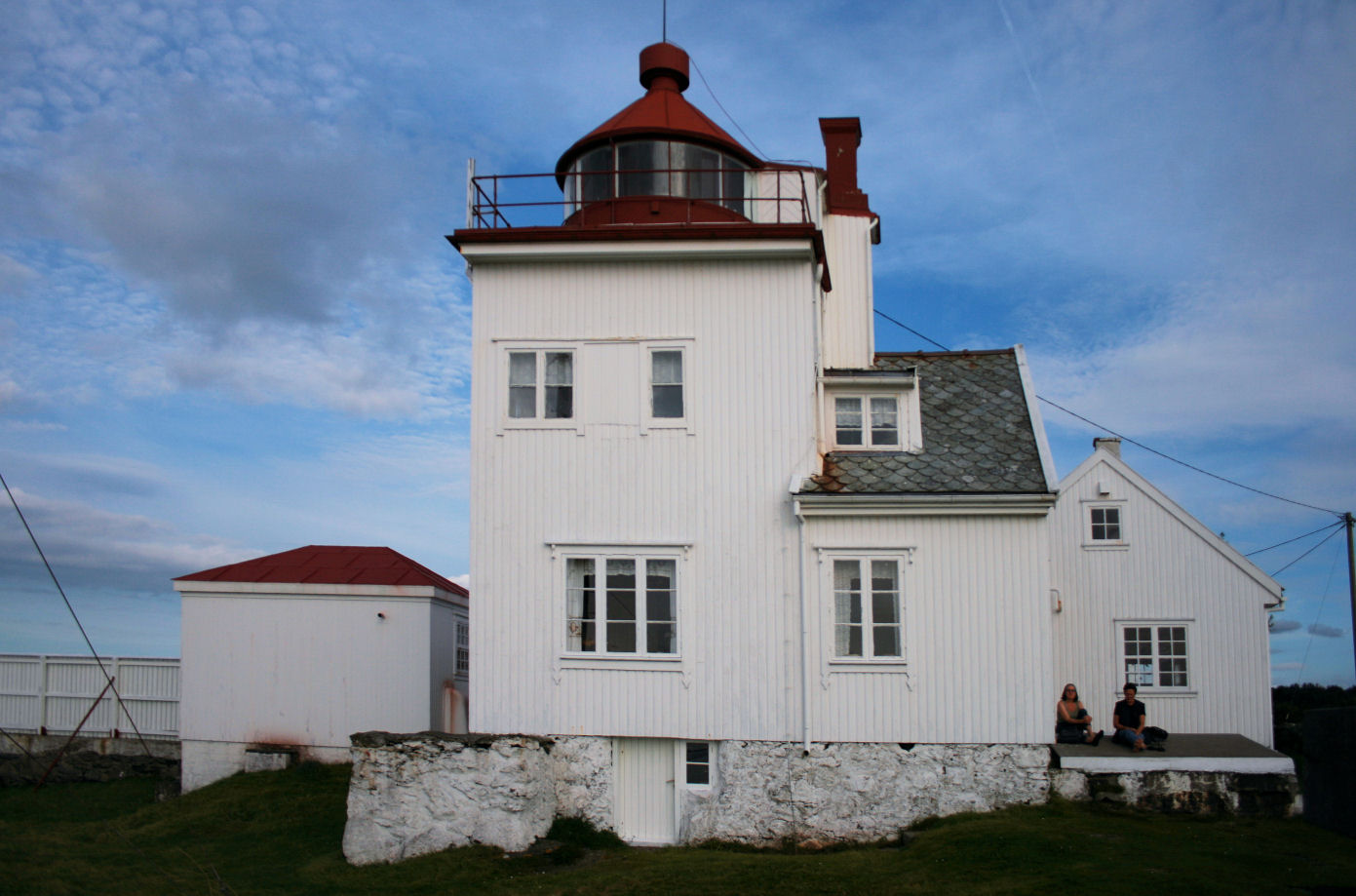
Tungenes Lighthouse in Rogaland County

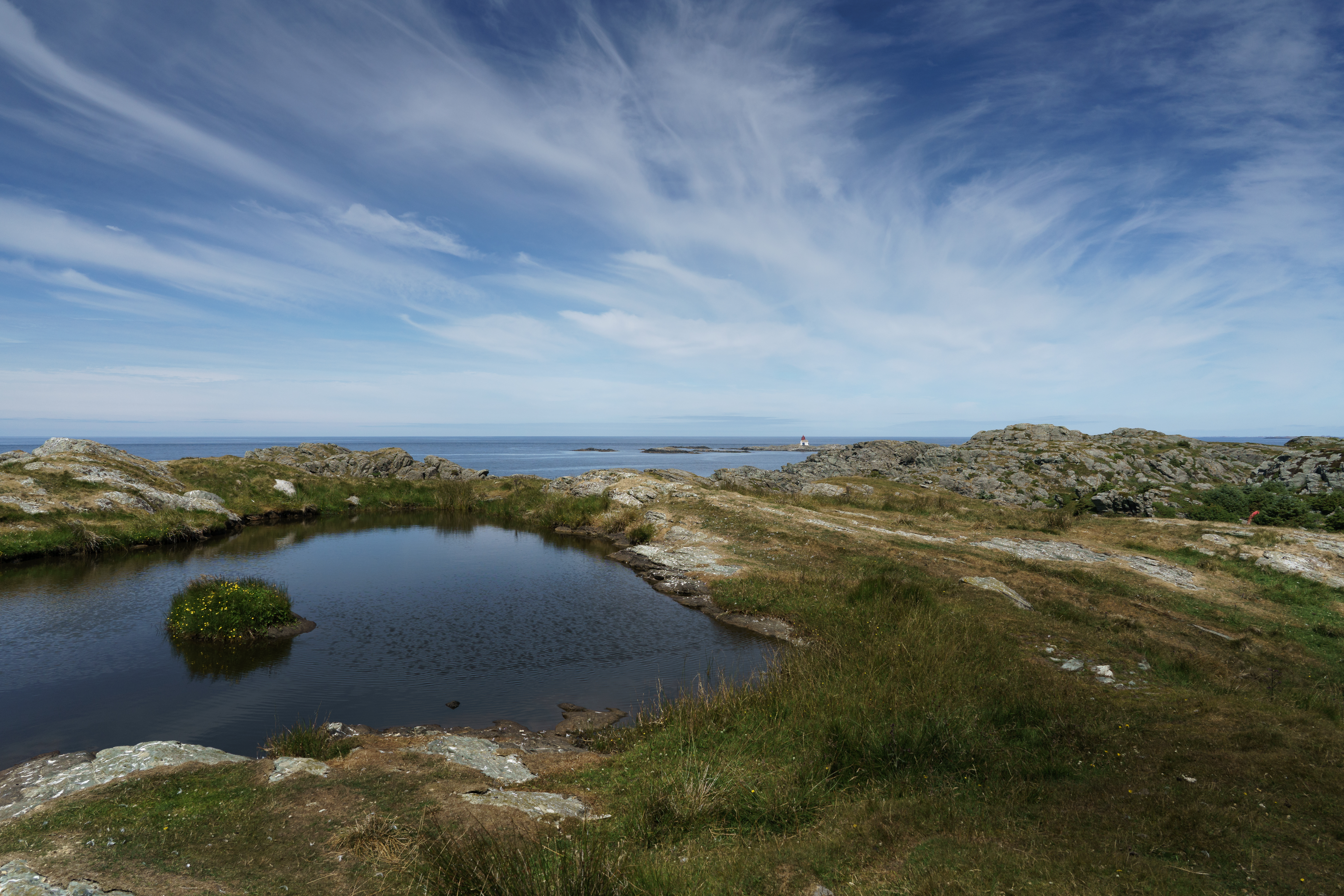
Røværsholmen Lighthouse in Rogaland County

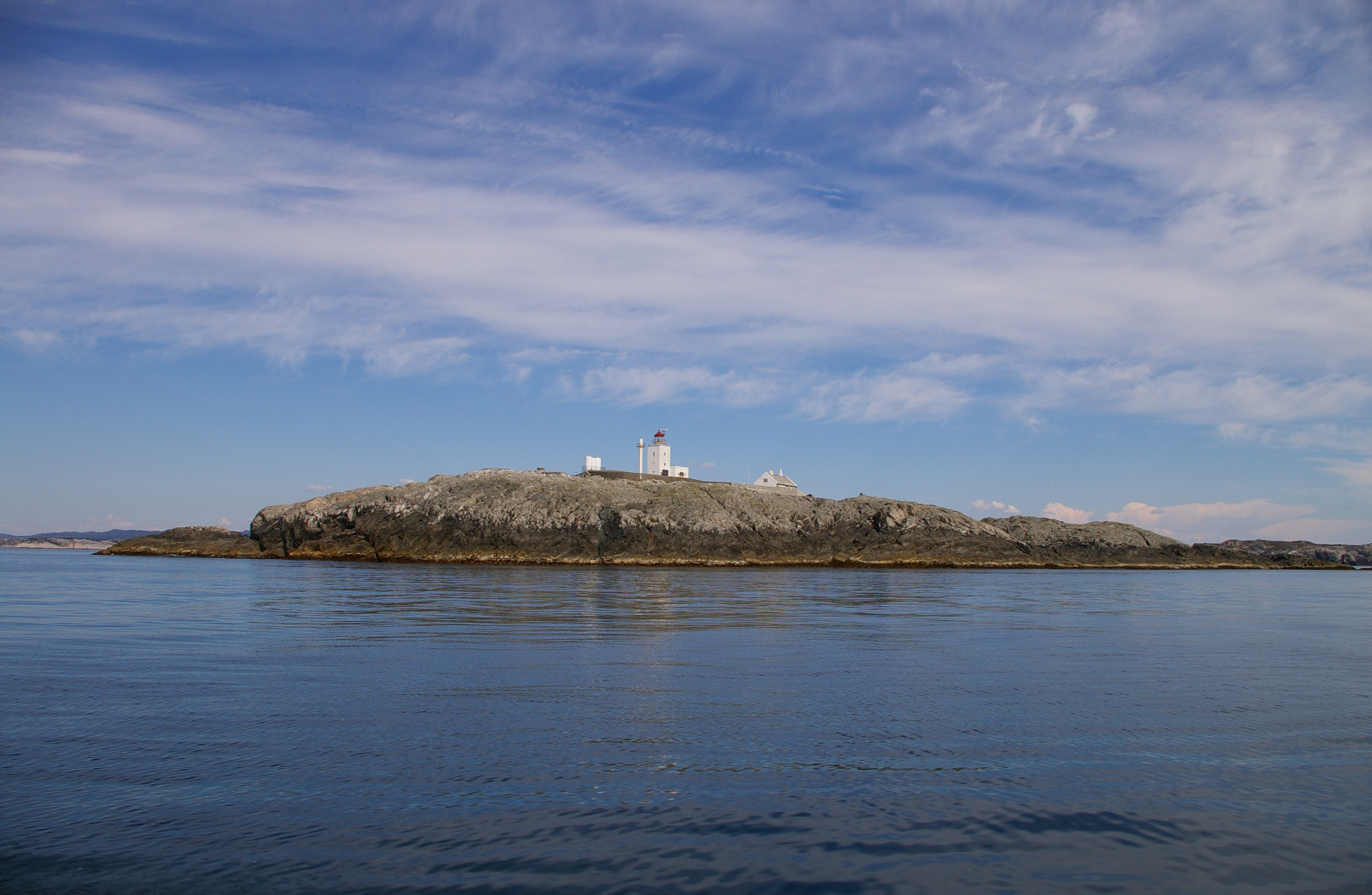
Marstein Lighthouse in Vestland County

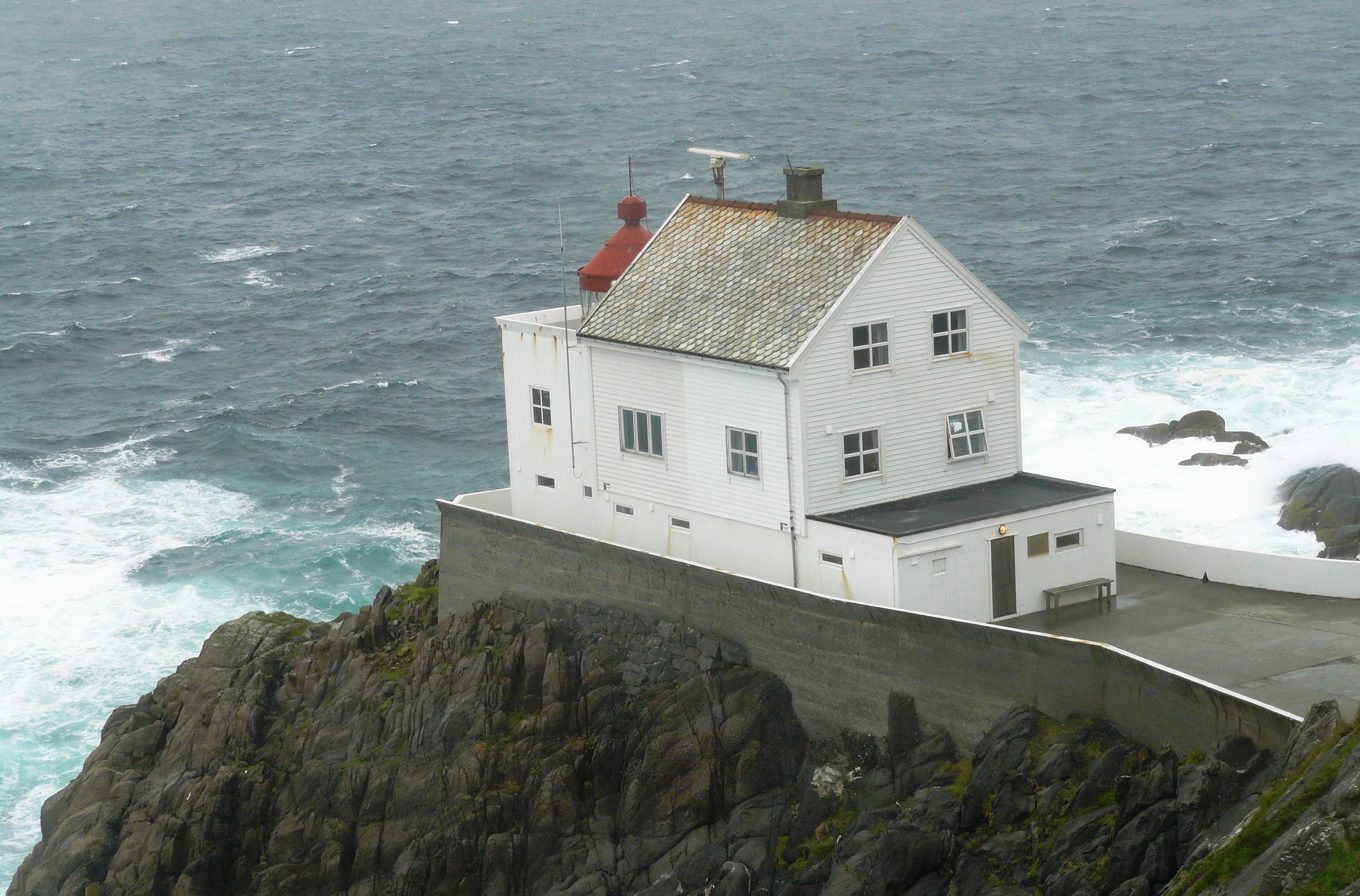
Kråkenes Lighthouse in Vestland County

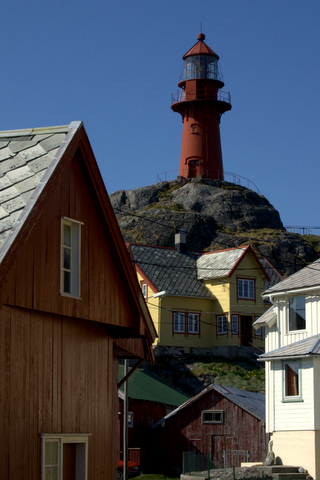
Ona Lighthouse in Møre og Romsdal County

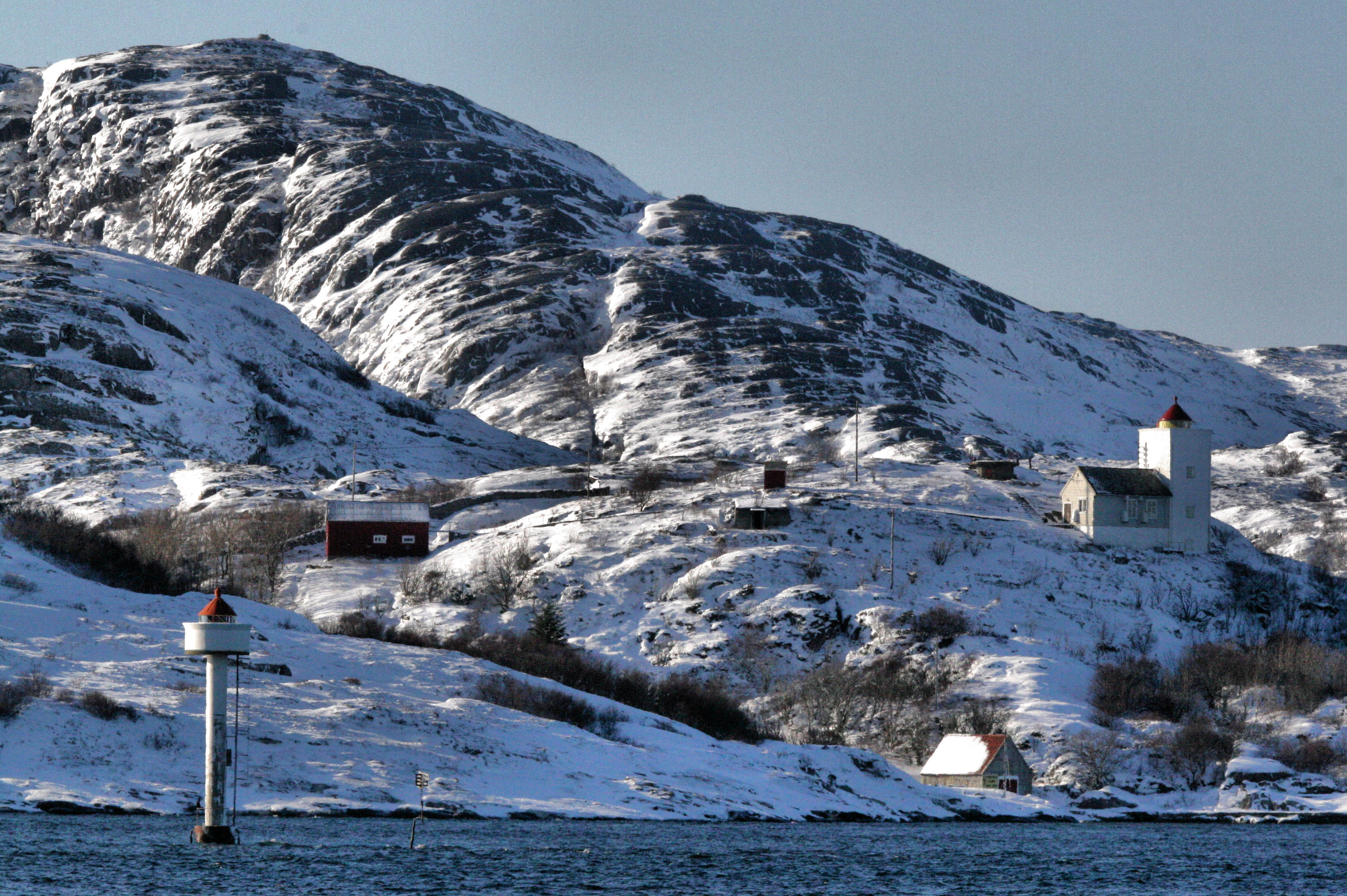
Agdenes Lighthouse in Trøndelag County

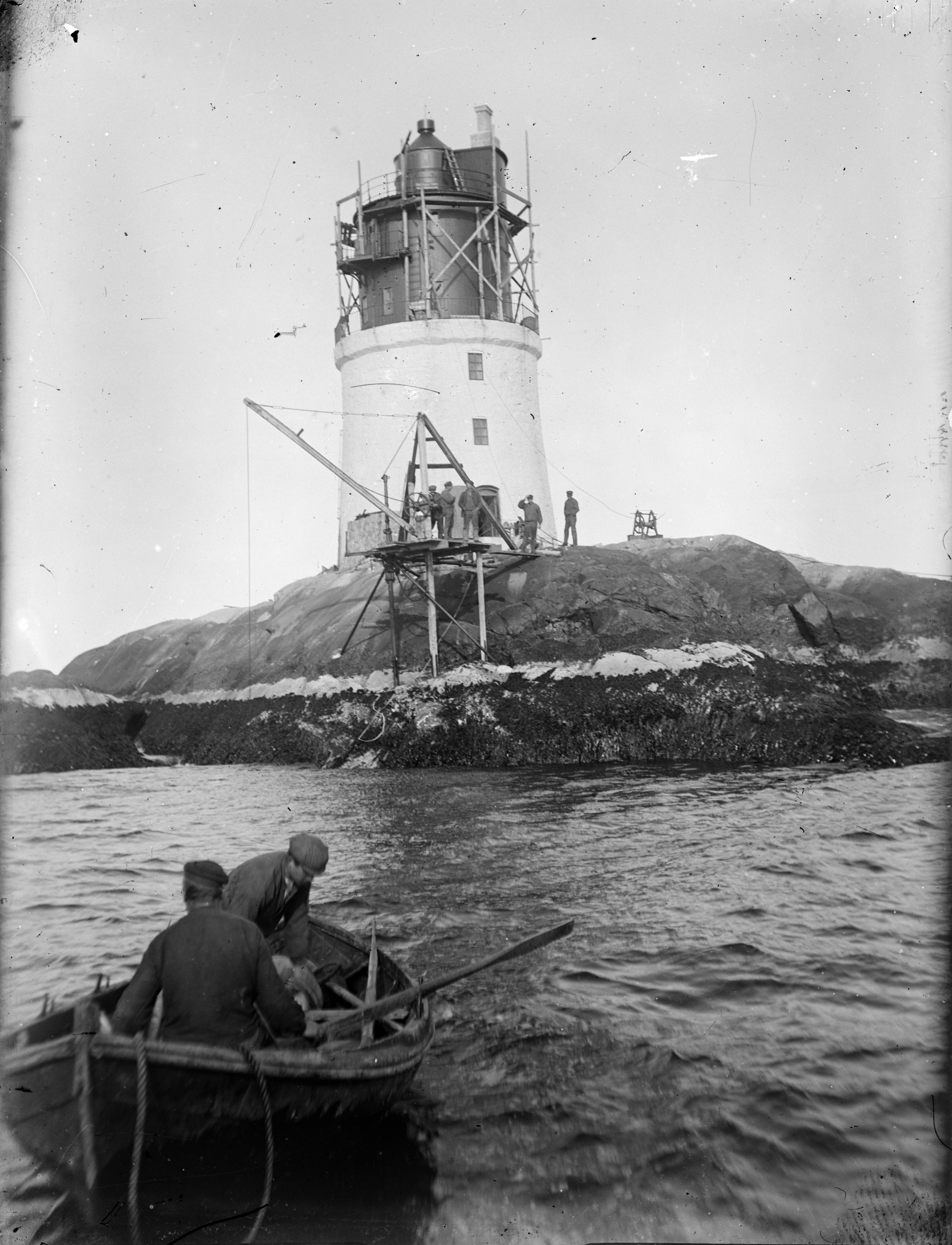
Gjæslingan Lighthouse (pictured in early 20th century) in Trøndelag County

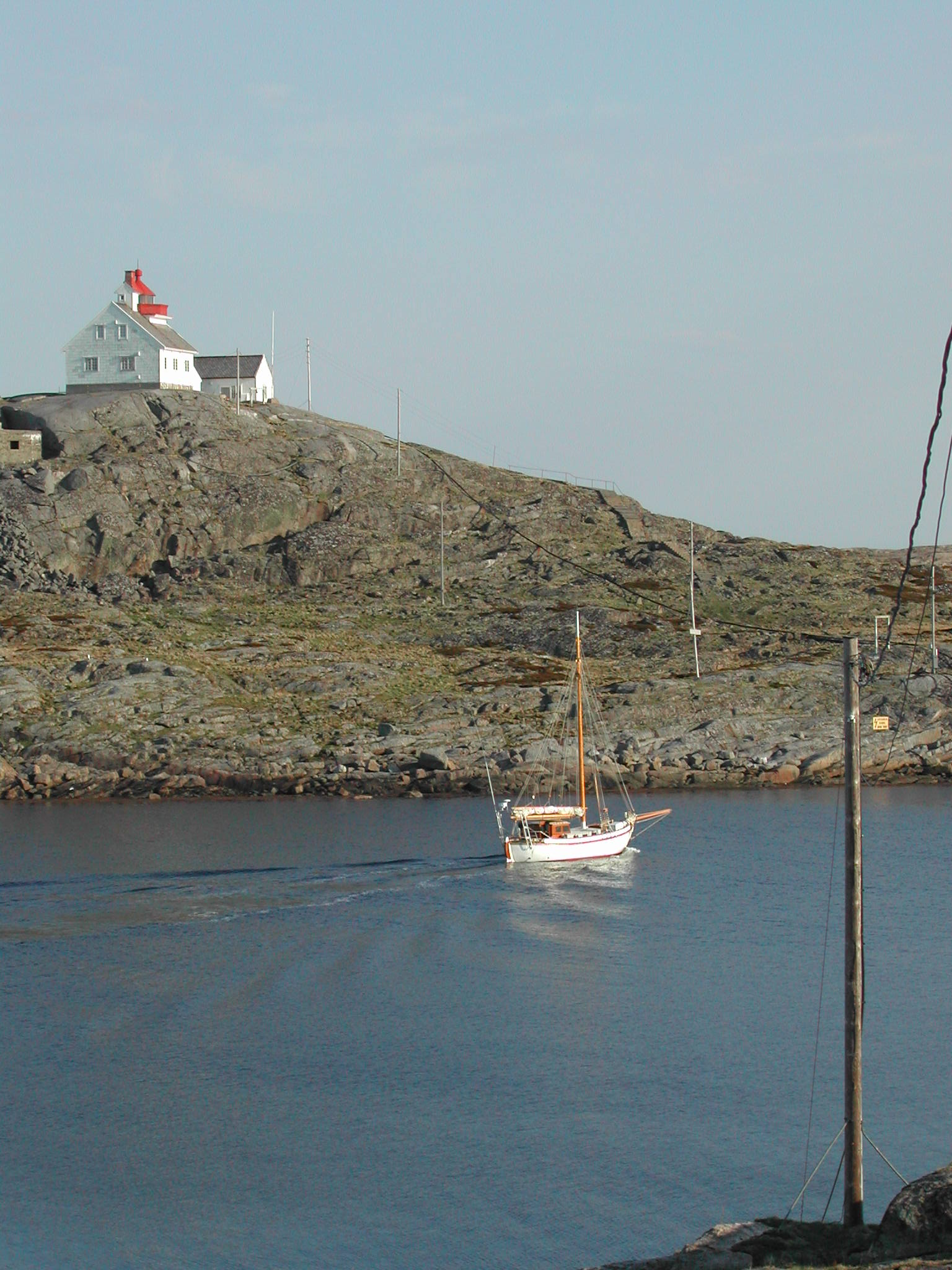
Myken Lighthouse in Nordland County

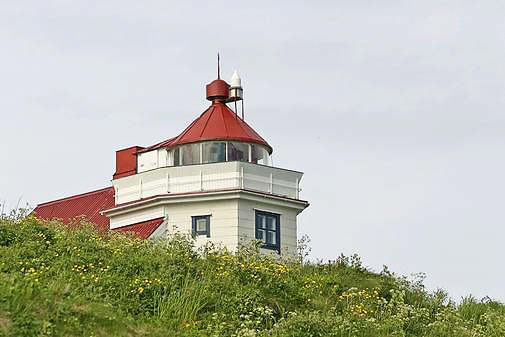
Hekkingen Lighthouse in Troms County

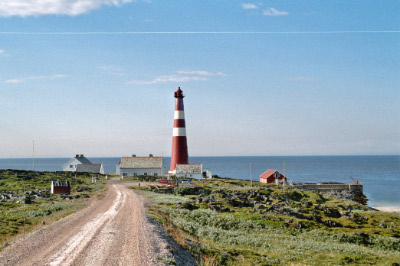
Slettnes Lighthouse in Finnmark County

== Østfold ==
- Torbjørnskjær Lighthouse, Hvaler (1872)
- Homlungen Lighthouse, Hvaler (1867)
- Strømtangen Lighthouse, Fredrikstad (1859)
- Struten Lighthouse, Fredrikstad (1907)
- Gullholmen Lighthouse, Moss (1894–1984)

== Akershus ==
- Digerudgrunnen Lighthouse, Frogn (1871–1975)
- Steilene Lighthouse, Nesodden (1827)

== Oslo ==
- Heggholmen Lighthouse, Oslo (1827)
- Dyna Lighthouse, Oslo (1874)
- Kavringen Lighthouse, Oslo (1892)

== Buskerud ==
- Filtvet Lighthouse, Asker (1840–1985)

== Vestfold ==
- Bastøy Lighthouse, Horten (1840–1986)
- Medfjordbåen Lighthouse, Tønsberg
- Torgersøy Lighthouse, Tønsberg (1851–1890)
- Fulehuk Lighthouse, Færder (1821–1989)
- Store Færder Lighthouse, Færder (1697–1857)
- Færder Lighthouse, Færder (1857)
- Svenner Lighthouse, Larvik (1874)
- Stavernsodden Lighthouse, Larvik (1855)
- Tvistein Lighthouse, Larvik (1908)

== Telemark ==
- Langøytangen Lighthouse, Bamble (1839)
- Jomfruland Lighthouse, Kragerø (1839)
- Strømtangen Lighthouse, Kragerø (1874)
- Stavseng Lighthouse], Kragerø (1874)

== Agder ==
- Stangholmen Lighthouse, Risør (1855)
- Lyngør Lighthouse, Tvedestrand (1879)
- Ytre Møkkalasset Lighthouse, Arendal (1888–1986)
- Store Torungen Lighthouse, Arendal (1844)
- Lille Torungen Lighthouse, Arendal (1844)
- Sandvigodden Lighthouse, Arendal (1844)
- Rivingen Lighthouse, Grimstad (1886)
- Homborsund Lighthouse, Grimstad (1879)
- Saltholmen Lighthouse, Lillesand (1882)
- Grønningen Lighthouse, Kristiansand (1878)
- Oksøy Lighthouse, Kristiansand (1832)
- Odderøya Lighthouse, Kristiansand (1832–1984)
- Songvår Lighthouse, Kristiansand (1888)
- Ryvingen Lighthouse, Lindesnes (1867)
- Hatholmen Lighthouse, Lindesnes (1867)
- Lindesnes Lighthouse, Lindesnes (1655)
- Markøy Lighthouse, Lyngdal (1725–1844)
- Søndre Katland Lighthouse, Farsund (1878)
- Lista Lighthouse, Farsund (1836)

== Rogaland ==
- Lille Presteskjær Lighthouse, Sokndal (1895–1973)
- Vibberodden Lighthouse, Eigersund (1855–1977)
- Eigerøy Lighthouse, Eigersund (1854)
- Kvassheim Lighthouse, Hå (1912–1990)
- Obrestad Lighthouse, Hå (1873)
- Feistein Lighthouse, Klepp (1859)
- Flatholmen Lighthouse, Sola (1862)
- Tungenes Lighthouse, Randaberg (1828–1984)
- Kvitsøy Lighthouse, Kvitsøy (1700)
- Fjøløy Lighthouse, Stavanger (1849)
- Vikeholmen Lighthouse, Karmøy (1849–1908)
- Høgevarde Lighthouse, Karmøy (1700–1902)
- Sørhaugøy Lighthouse, Haugesund (1846–1952)
- Skudenes Lighthouse, Karmøy (1799–1924)
- Geitungen Lighthouse, Karmøy (1924)
- Utsira Lighthouse, Utsira (1844)
- Røværsholmen Lighthouse, Haugesund (1892)

== Vestland ==
- Ryvarden Lighthouse, Sveio (1849)
- Leirvik Lighthouse, Stord
- Slåtterøy Lighthouse, Bømlo (1859)
- Øksehamaren Lighthouse, Austevoll (1849–1918)
- Marstein Lighthouse, Austevoll (1877)
- Hellisøy Lighthouse, Fedje (1855)
- Holmengrå Lighthouse, Fedje (1892)
- Utvær Lighthouse, Solund (1900)
- Geita Lighthouse, Askvoll (1897)
- Ytterøyane Lighthouse, Kinn (1881)
- Stabben Lighthouse, Kinn (1867)
- Kvanhovden Lighthouse, Kinn (1895)
- Hendanes Lighthouse, Kinn (1914)
- Ulvesund Lighthouse, Kinn (1870)
- Skongenes Lighthouse, Kinn (1870)
- Kråkenes Lighthouse, Kinn (1906)

== Møre og Romsdal ==
- Svinøy Lighthouse, Sande (1905)
- Haugsholmen Lighthouse, Sande (1876)
- Flåvær Lighthouse, Herøy (1870)
- Runde Lighthouse, Herøy (1767)
- Grasøyane Lighthouse, Ulstein (1836)
- Hogsteinen Lighthouse, Giske (1857–1905)
- Alnes Lighthouse, Giske (1853)
- Erkna Lighthouse, Giske (1869)
- Storholmen Lighthouse, Giske (1920)
- Lepsøyrev Lighthouse, Haram (1879)
- Hellevik Lighthouse, Haram (1880–1988)
- Ulla Lighthouse, Haram (1875)
- Ona Lighthouse, Ålesund (1867)
- Flatflesa Lighthouse, Ålesund (1902–1988)
- Bjørnsund Lighthouse, Hustadvika (1871)
- Kvitholmen Lighthouse, Hustadvika (1842)
- Hestskjær Lighthouse, Averøy (1879)
- Stavnes Lighthouse, Averøy (1842)
- Grip Lighthouse, Kristiansund (1888)
- Tyrhaug Lighthouse, Smøla (1833)
- Skalmen Lighthouse, Smøla (1907)
- Haugjegla Lighthouse, Smøla (1922)

== Trøndelag ==
- Sletringen Lighthouse, Frøya (1899)
- Sula Lighthouse, Frøya (1909)
- Vingleia Lighthouse, Frøya (1921–1985)
- Finnvær Lighthouse, Frøya (1912)
- Halten Lighthouse, Frøya (1875)
- Terningen Lighthouse, Hitra (1833)
- Børøyholmen Lighthouse, Hitra (1874–1970)
- Agdenes Lighthouse, Orkland (1804–1984)
- Asenvågøy Lighthouse, Ørland (1921)
- Kjeungskjær Lighthouse, Ørland (1880)
- Kaura Lighthouse, Åfjord (1931)
- Buholmråsa Lighthouse, Osen (1917)
- Kya Lighthouse, Osen (1920)
- Villa Lighthouse, Flatanger (1839–1890)
- Ellingråsa Lighthouse, Flatanger
- Gjeslingene Lighthouse, Nærøysund (1877)
- Grinna Lighthouse, Nærøysund (1904)
- Nordøyan Lighthouse, Nærøysund (1890)
- Prestøy Lighthouse, Nærøysund (1841–1904)
- Nærøysund Lighthouse, Nærøysund (1904)
- Sklinna Lighthouse, Leka (1910)

== Nordland ==
- Bremstein Lighthouse, Vega (1925)
- Ytterholmen Lighthouse, Herøy (1912)
- Åsvær Lighthouse, Dønna (1876)
- Træna Lighthouse, Træna (1877)
- Myken Lighthouse, Rødøy (1918)
- Kalsholmen Lighthouse, Meløy (1916)
- Tennholmen Lighthouse, Gildeskål (1901)
- Bodø Lighthouse, Bodø (1875–1907)
- Landegode Lighthouse, Bodø (1902)
- Bjørnøy Lighthouse, Bodø (1890–1972)
- Måløy–Skarholmen Lighthouse, Steigen (1922)
- Flatøy Lighthouse, Steigen (1882–1966)
- Tranøy Lighthouse, Hamarøy (1864)
- Barøy Lighthouse, Narvik (1903)
- Skrova Lighthouse, Vågan (1922)
- Moholmen Lighthouse, Vågan (1914)
- Rotvær Lighthouse, Lødingen (1914–1985)
- Skomvær Lighthouse, Røst (1887)
- Glåpen Lighthouse, Moskenes (1857–1985)
- Litløy Lighthouse, Bø (1912)
- Anda Lighthouse, Øksnes (1932)
- Andenes Lighthouse, Andøy (1859)

== Troms ==
- Hekkingen Lighthouse, Senja (1859)
- Torsvåg Lighthouse, Karlsøy (1916)
- Fugløykalven Lighthouse, Karlsøy (1920)

== Finnmark ==
- Fuglenes Lighthouse, Hammerfest (1859–?)
- Fruholmen Lighthouse, Måsøy (1866)
- Helnes Lighthouse, Nordkapp (1908)
- Slettnes Lighthouse, Gamvik (1905)
- Kjølnes Lighthouse, Berlevåg (1916)
- Makkaur Lighthouse, Båtsfjord (1928)
- Vardø Lighthouse, Vardø (1896)
- Bøkfjord Lighthouse, Sør-Varanger (1910)
