= Vardø Lighthouse =

Coastal lighthouse in Vardø, Norway

Vardø Lighthouse Hornøya
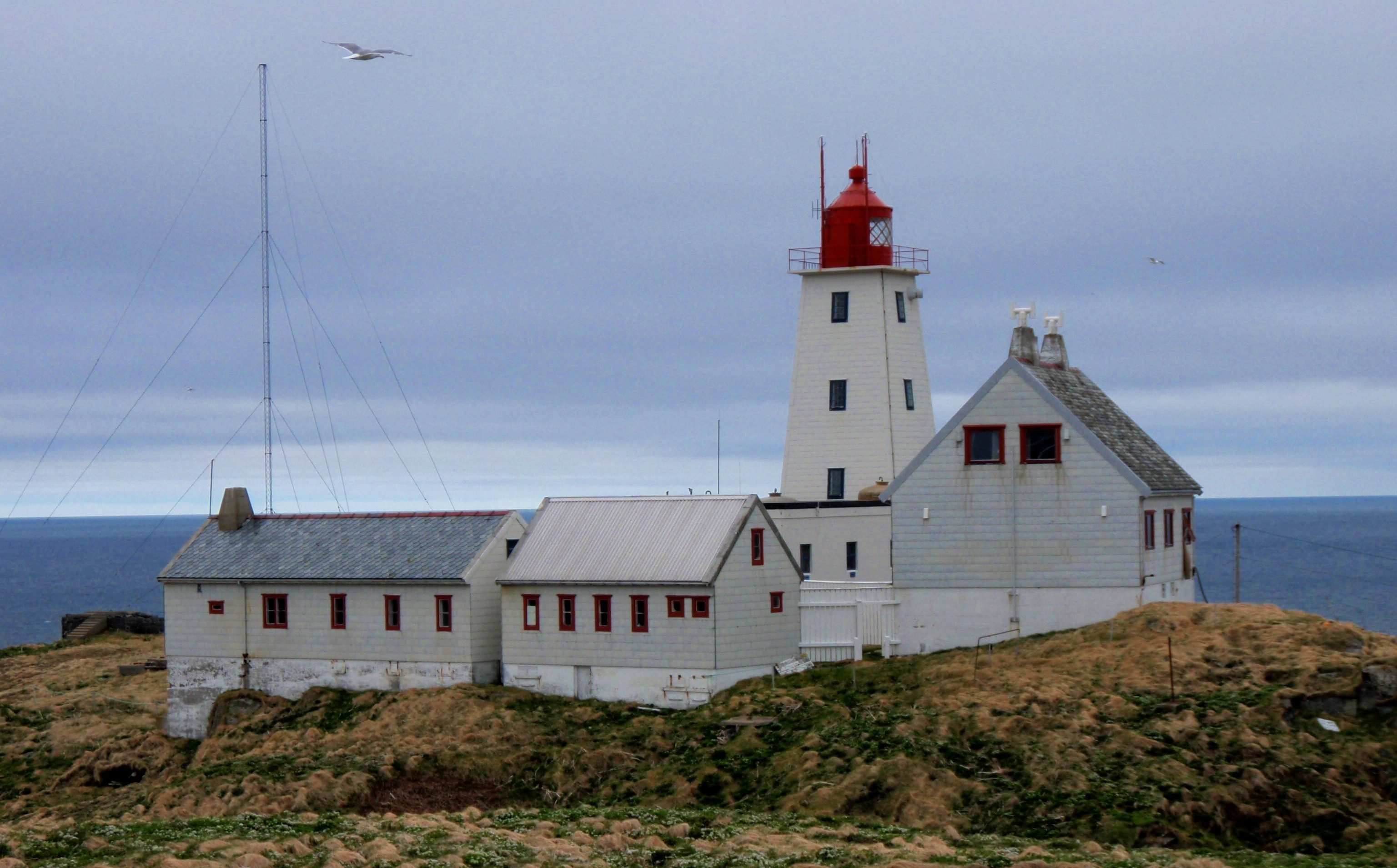
- Vardø Lighthouse
- Location of the lighthouse
- Location: Hornøya, Vardø, Finnmark, Norway
- Coordinates: 70°23′20.1″N 31°09′23.2″E

Tower
- Constructed: 1896
- Construction: wooden tower
- Automated: 1991
- Height: 20 metres (66 ft)
- Shape: square tower with balcony and lantern
- Markings: white tower, red lantern
- Heritage: cultural heritage preservation in Norway

Light
- Focal height: 77.2 metres (253 ft)
- Intensity: 1,809,000 candela
- Range: 23 nmi (43 km; 26 mi)
- Characteristic: Fl W 30s.
- Norway no.: 968500

Vardø Lighthouse (Norwegian: Vardø fyr) is a coastal lighthouse located on the island of Hornøya, just off the coast of the town of Vardø in Vardø Municipality in Finnmark county, Norway. It is the easternmost lighthouse in Norway.

== Description ==
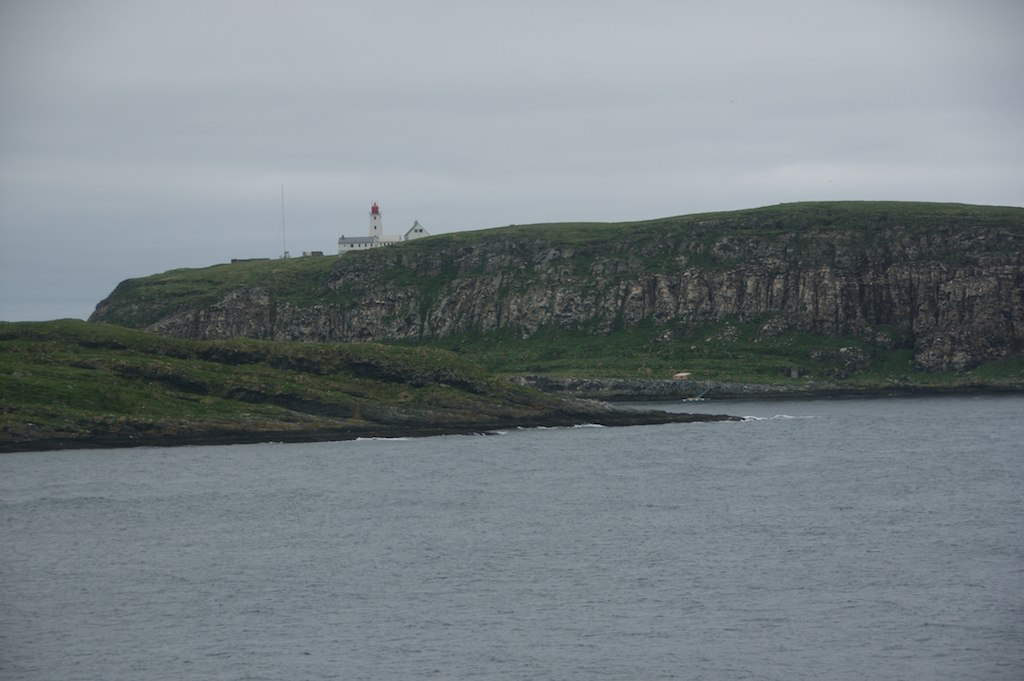
View of the lighthouse from a distance.

Vardø Lighthouse was established in 1896 and automated in 1991. The lighthouse was listed as a protected site in 1998.

The 20-metre-tall (66 ft) white, square pyramidal, wooden tower has a red, metal, cylindrical light room on top. The light emits a white flash every 30 seconds. The 1,809,000-candela light can be seen for up to 23 nmi (43 km; 26 mi). The light is emitted at an altitude of 77.2 metres (253 ft) above sea level.

The light burns from 12 August until 24 April each year, but it is off during the summers due to the midnight sun. The site is located on a rocky island, just off the Vardø harbor. It is only accessible by boat, and it is closed to the public.

== See also ==
- Lighthouses in Norway
- List of lighthouses in Norway
