= Grimstad =

Grimstad may refer to:

== Places ==
=== Norway ===
- Grimstad Municipality, a municipality in Agder county
- Grimstad (town), a town within Grimstad Municipality in Agder county
- Grimstad Church, a church in the town of Grimstad in Agder county
- Grimstad, Østfold, a village in Råde Municipality in Østfold county

=== United States ===
- Grimstad Township, Roseau County, Minnesota, a township in Minnesota

== People ==
- Grimstad (surname), a list of people with the surname of Grimstad

== Other ==
- Grimstad Bible School, a Bible school in Grimstad, Norway
