= Keren Tzur =

Israeli actress

- קרן צור
- Tzur in 2026
- Born: September 9, 1974 (age 51)
- Education: University of Haifa
- Occupations: actress director
- Children: 3

Keren Tzur (Hebrew: קרן צור; born 9 September 1974) is an Israeli actress and theatre director.

== Early life and education ==
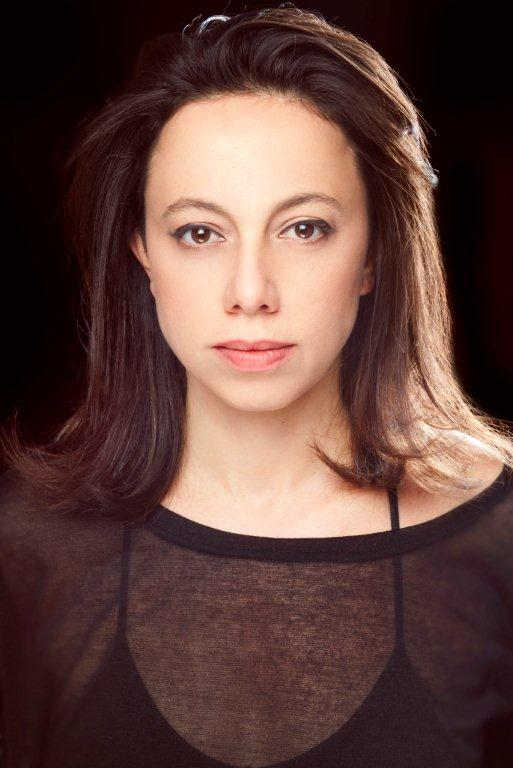
Tzur in 2014

Tzur was born on 9 September 1974. Her mother, Rivka Tzur, is a teacher and her father, Eliezer Tzur, was an electrical engineer for submarines in the Israeli Military. Tzur's grandmother, Yona Weinberger, was a Holocaust survivor from Hungary who immigrated to Israel after being liberated from Auschwitz.

She spent her childhood living in the United Kingdom and Germany, due to her father's stations in the military. She graduated from the International School of Hamburg in 1991. She studied acting at the University of Haifa, graduating in 2001.

Tzur served in the Israeli Navy and in the Computer Service Directorate.

== Career ==
Tzur has performed on stage, on television, and in film. In 2004, she performed in various roles at the Beit Lisin Theater. In 2008, she won the Israeli Theater Prize for Best Actor of the Year for her work in the play Anda. In 2010, she directed the plays Sweet Future and Missing Beat.

In 2013, Tzur was in the movie Jerusalem Syndrome and in 2014 she was in the movie A Borrowed Identity.

In 2015, she won an award for her role in the play Grounded at the Theatronto Festival.

She portrays Elizabeth in the 2024 film Mary.

== Personal life ==
Tzur is married and has three children. She lives in Haifa.
