= Lille Presteskjær Lighthouse =

Coastal lighthouse in Norway

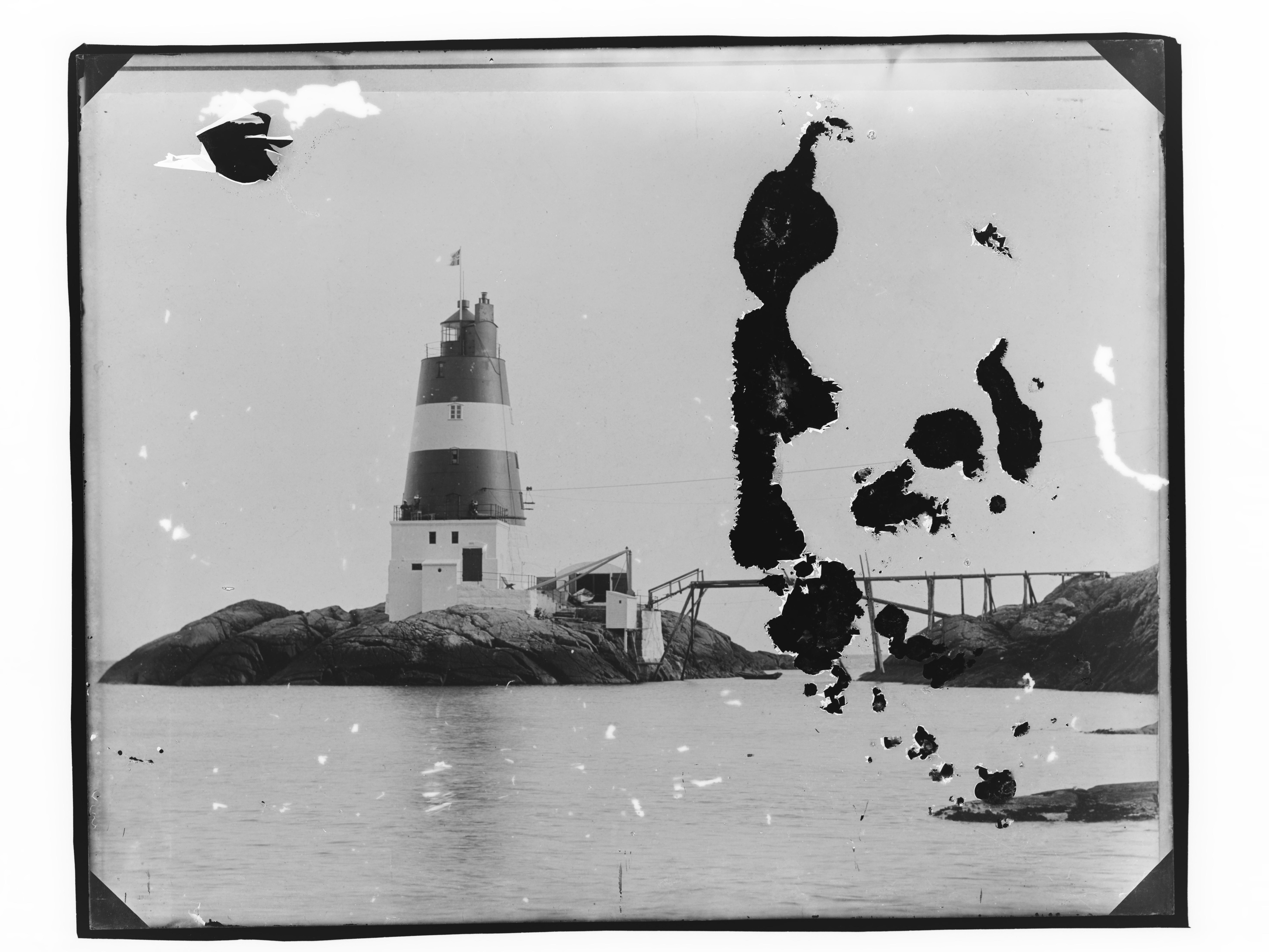
- View of the lighthouse, circa 1900.
- Location: Rogaland, Norway
- Coordinates: 58°19′23″N 6°15′28″E

Tower
- Constructed: 1895
- Foundation: Stone base
- Construction: Cast iron tower
- Automated: 1973
- Height: 20.8 metres (68 ft)
- Shape: Tapered cylindrical tower
- Markings: Red with white stripe
- Operator: Norwegian Coastal Administration

Light
- Focal height: 23.5 metres (77 ft)
- Range: 11 nmi (20 km; 13 mi) (white), 9 nmi (17 km; 10 mi) (red)
- Characteristic: Al Fl(3) WR 12s
- Norway no.: 092000

Lille Presteskjær Lighthouse (Norwegian: Lille Presteskjær fyr) is a coastal lighthouse near Rekefjord in Sokndal Municipality in Rogaland county, Norway. The lighthouse is owned by the Norwegian Coastal Administration. It was established in 1895, and was automated and depopulated in 1973.

The lighthouse is located on the west side of the entrance to the Rekefjord, about 1.5 kilometres (0.93 mi) south of the village of Rekefjord and about 5 kilometres (3.1 mi) southwest of the municipal centre of Hauge. The 20.8-metre (68 ft) tall round cast iron tower sits on a stone base. The light is at an elevation of 23.5 metres (77 ft) and it shows three flashes every 12 seconds. The light can be seen for up to 10.6 nautical miles (19.6 km; 12.2 mi). The original lantern on top of the tower was removed and discarded when the lighthouse was automated in 1973; the present lantern is a replica. The tower is painted red with a white horizontal band.

== See also ==
- List of lighthouses in Norway
- Lighthouses in Norway
