= Hekkingen Lighthouse =

Coastal lighthouse in Senja, Norway

Hekkingen Lighthouse Hekkingen fyrstasjon
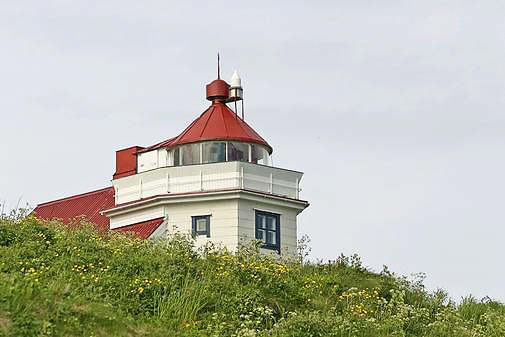
- View of the lighthouse
- Location of the lighthouse
- Location: Troms, Norway
- Coordinates: 69.6016°N 17.8298°E

Tower
- Constructed: 1859
- Construction: Wooden
- Automated: 1988
- Height: 10 metres (33 ft)
- Shape: Trapezoidal tower attached to the keeper's house
- Markings: White with red top
- Operator
- Heritage: cultural heritage preservation in Norway
- Racon: M

Light
- Focal height: 23 metres (75 ft)
- Intensity: 27,000 candela
- Range: 14.6 nmi (27.0 km; 16.8 mi)
- Characteristic: Oc WRG (2) 8s
- Norway no.: 862500

Hekkingen Lighthouse (Norwegian: Hekkingen fyr) is a coastal lighthouse located in the Malangen fjord in Senja Municipality in Troms county, Norway. It was first lit in 1859. The lighthouse was listed as a protected site in 2000.

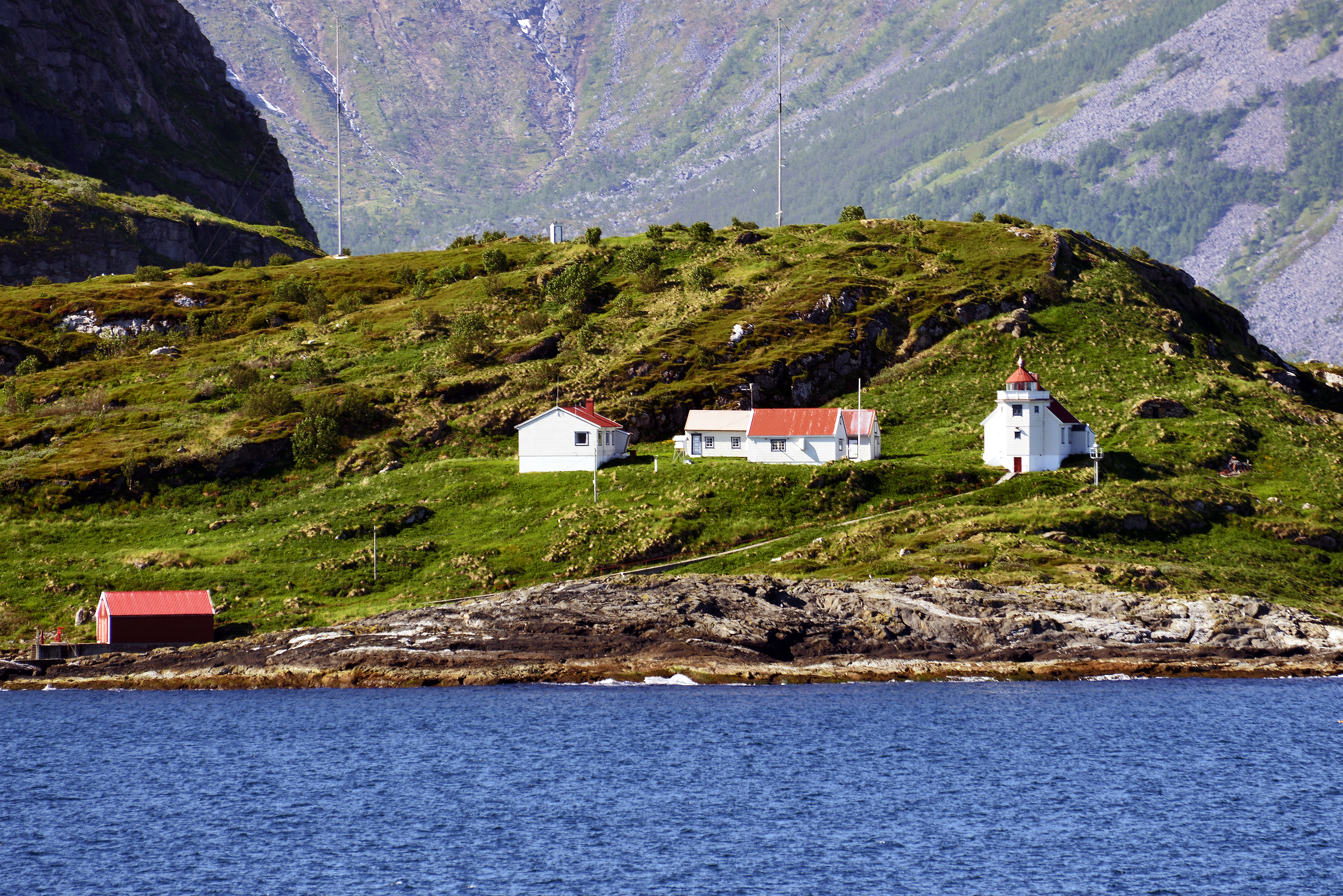
Hekkingen Lighthouse

== Climate ==
Climate data for Hekkingen Lighthouse 1991-2020 (33 m)
Month	Jan	Feb	Mar	Apr	May	Jun	Jul	Aug	Sep	Oct	Nov	Dec	Year
Mean daily maximum °C (°F)	1.2 (34.2)	0.8 (33.4)	1.8 (35.2)	4.5 (40.1)	8.6 (47.5)	11.5 (52.7)	14.4 (57.9)	14.1 (57.4)	11.2 (52.2)	6.7 (44.1)	4 (39)	2.4 (36.3)	6.8 (44.2)
Daily mean °C (°F)	−1 (30)	−1.4 (29.5)	−0.2 (31.6)	2.4 (36.3)	6 (43)	9 (48)	11.8 (53.2)	11.7 (53.1)	9.1 (48.4)	4.9 (40.8)	2.1 (35.8)	0.3 (32.5)	4.6 (40.2)
Mean daily minimum °C (°F)	−2.7 (27.1)	−3 (27)	−1.9 (28.6)	0.5 (32.9)	4 (39)	7.3 (45.1)	9.9 (49.8)	10 (50)	7.5 (45.5)	3.5 (38.3)	0.6 (33.1)	−1.3 (29.7)	2.9 (37.2)
Average precipitation mm (inches)	100 (3.9)	71 (2.8)	77 (3.0)	51 (2.0)	45 (1.8)	43 (1.7)	63 (2.5)	87 (3.4)	111 (4.4)	110 (4.3)	90 (3.5)	83 (3.3)	931 (36.6)
Source 1: Norwegian Meteorological Institute
Source 2: Meteostat Hekkingen

== See also ==
- Lighthouses in Norway
- List of lighthouses in Norway
