= Filtvet Lighthouse =

Lighthouse in Norway

Filtvet Lighthouse Filtvet Fyrstasjon
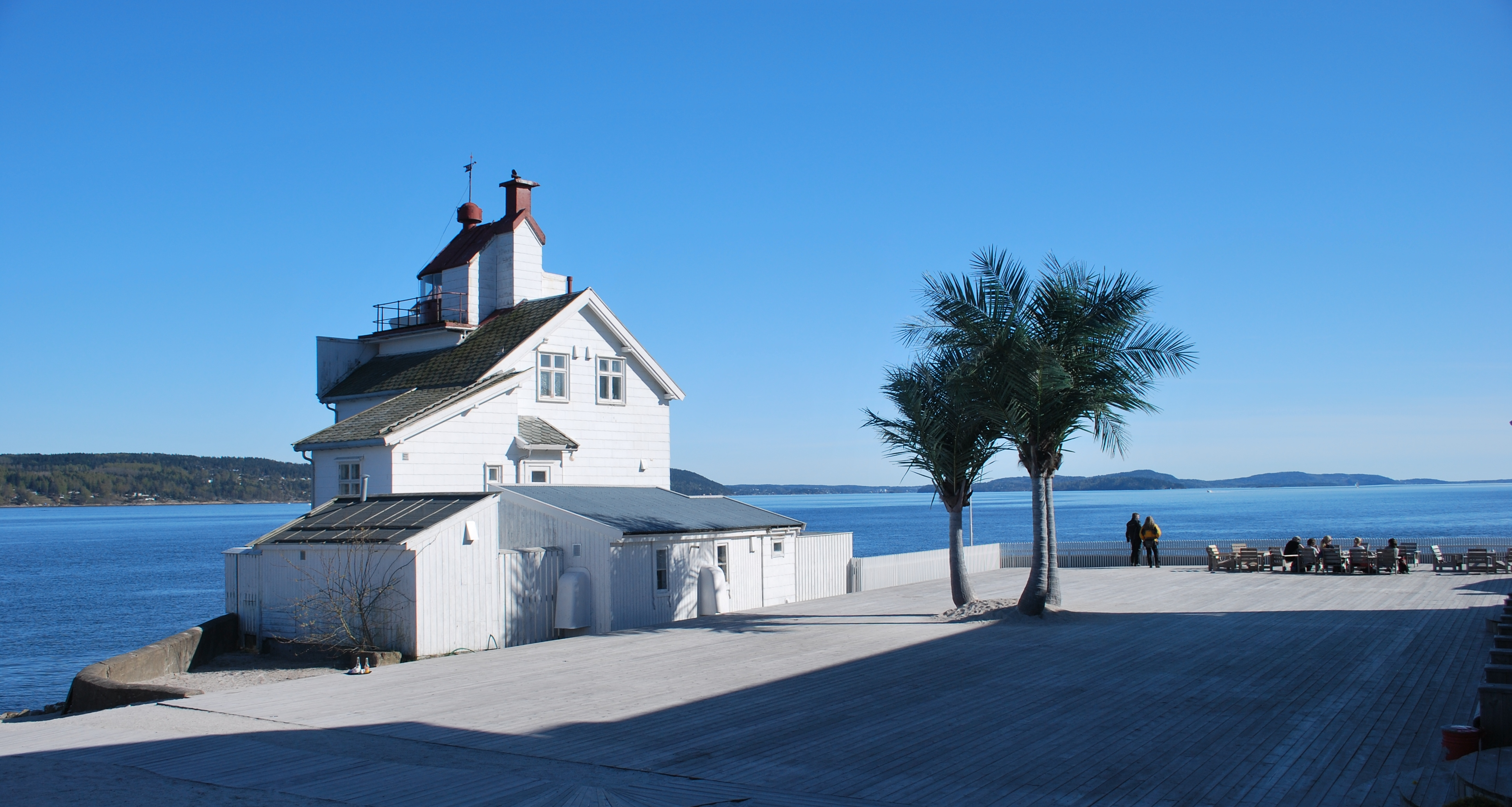
- Location: Hurum, Asker Municipality, Norway
- Coordinates: 59°34′16″N 10°37′05″E

Tower
- Constructed: 1840
- Height: 11 m (36 ft)
- Shape: lantern on keeper's house
- Operator: Norwegian historical lighthouse association
- Heritage: cultural heritage preservation in Norway

Light
- First lit: 1840
- Deactivated: 1985
- Current light
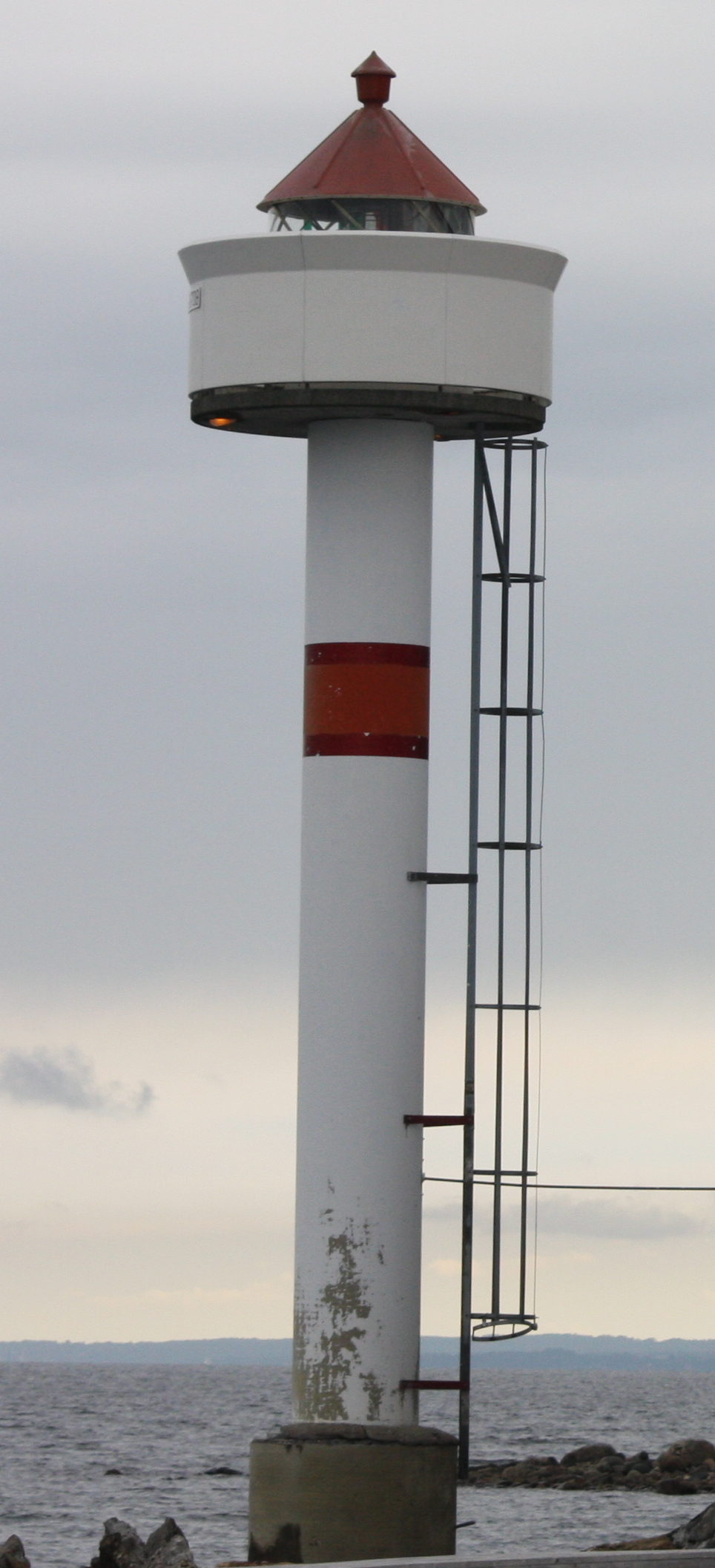
- Constructed: 1985
- Construction: concrete
- Height: 14 m (46 ft)
- Shape: cylinder
- Markings: White (tower), red (stripe), red (roof)
- Focal height: 13 m (43 ft)
- Range: 12 nmi (22 km; 14 mi)
- Characteristic: Oc(2) WRG 8s

Filtvet Lighthouse (Norwegian: Filtvet fyr) is a coastal lighthouse in the municipality of Hurum in Akershus, Norway. It was first established in 1840, and was replaced by a light in 1985. It was listed as a protected site in 1997.

== See also ==
- Lighthouses in Norway
- List of lighthouses in Norway
