= Dyna Lighthouse =

Coastal lighthouse in Oslo, Norway

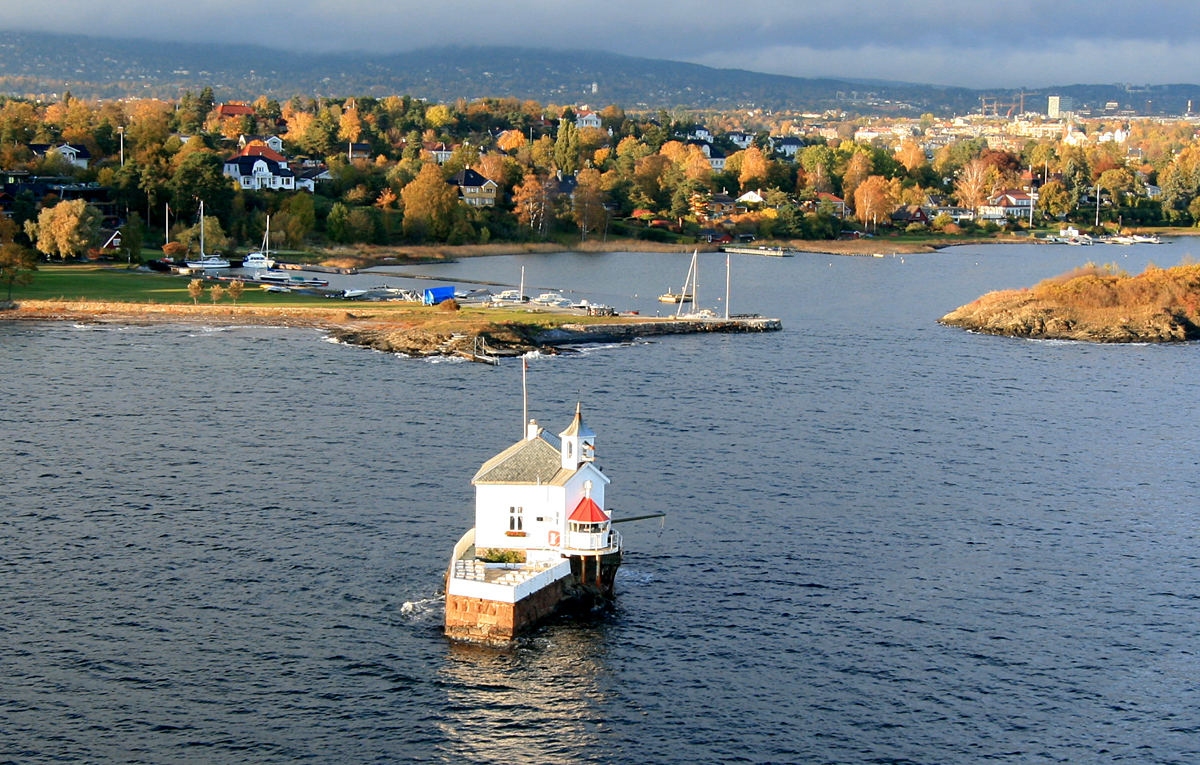
- Location: Oslo; Norway
- Coordinates: 59.894875°N 10.688419°E

Tower
- Constructed: 1875
- Construction: wooden house
- Automated: 1972
- Height: 12.5 metres (41 ft)
- Shape: lantern in one corner of the keeper's house
- Markings: white lighthouse and lantern, red lantern roof
- Operator: Dyna Fyr
- Heritage: cultural property

Light
- Focal height: 6 metres (20 ft)
- Intensity: 3,830 cd
- Range: white: 9 nautical miles (17 km; 10 mi) red: 9 nautical miles (17 km; 10 mi) green: 8 nautical miles (15 km; 9.2 mi)
- Characteristic: Oc (3) WRG 8s.

Dyna Lighthouse (Norwegian: Dyna fyr) is a coastal lighthouse on a reef south of Bygdøy, in Oslofjord, Oslo, Norway. It was established in 1875 and automated in 1956.

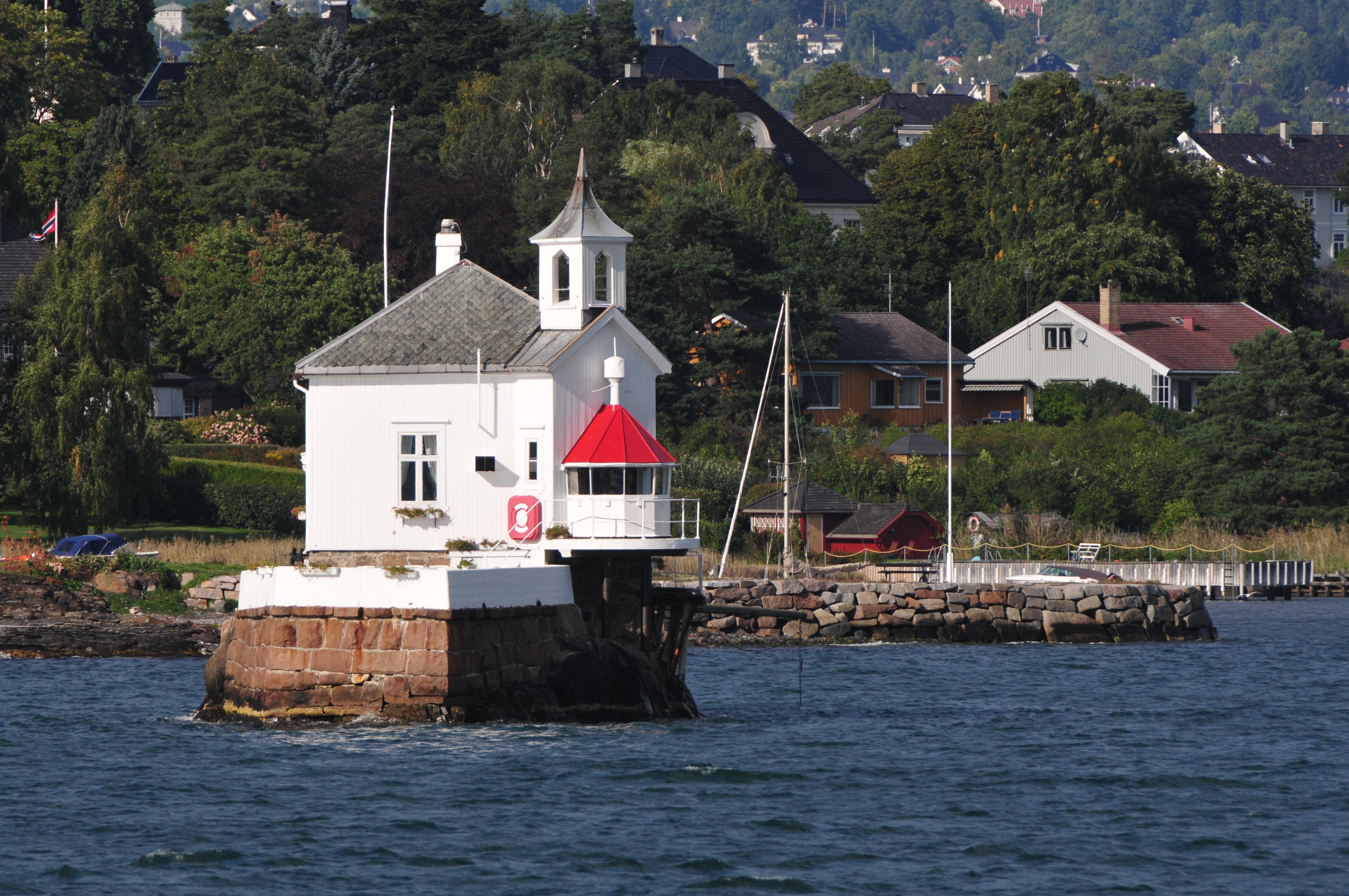
Dyna Fyr

In 1992 the lighthouse was renovated as a private banqueting facility, available for parties of 20-40 persons from Easter to Christmas.

== See also ==
- List of lighthouses in Norway
- Lighthouses in Norway
