= Kråkenes Lighthouse =

Coastal lighthouse in Norway

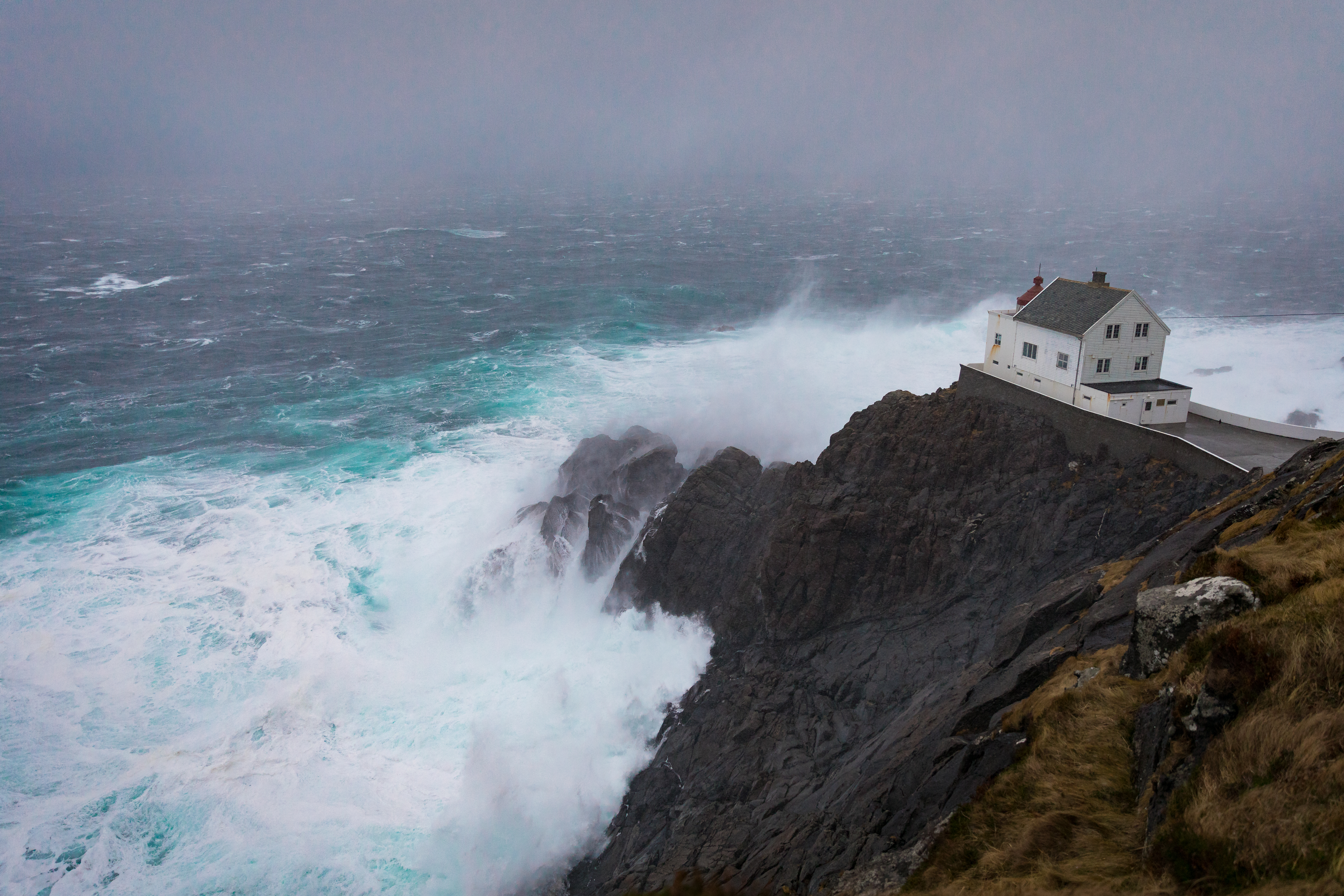
- Kråkenes Lighthouse during stormy weather.
- Location: Kinn Municipality; Vestland; Norway
- Coordinates: 62°02′05.3″N 04°59′10″E

Tower
- Constructed: 1906
- Construction: wooden tower
- Automated: 1986
- Height: 10.5 metres (34 ft)
- Markings: white tower, red lantern
- Operator: Kråkenes Fyr

Light
- First lit: 1950
- Focal height: 45.2 metres (148 ft)
- Intensity: 40,100 candela
- Range: 12.8 nmi (23.7 km; 14.7 mi)
- Characteristic: Oc WRG 6s.

Kråkenes Lighthouse (Norwegian: Kråkenes fyr) is a coastal lighthouse in Kinn Municipality in Vestland, Norway. It is located on a rocky, knife-like promontory jutting out of the northwestern tip of the island of Vågsøy.

== History ==
It was first lit in 1906 and automated in 1986. The original lighthouse was destroyed by fire following an Allied air raid in 1945. The current lighthouse now houses a restaurant and has rooms available for overnight accommodations.

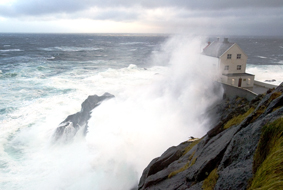
Stormy weather at the lighthouse

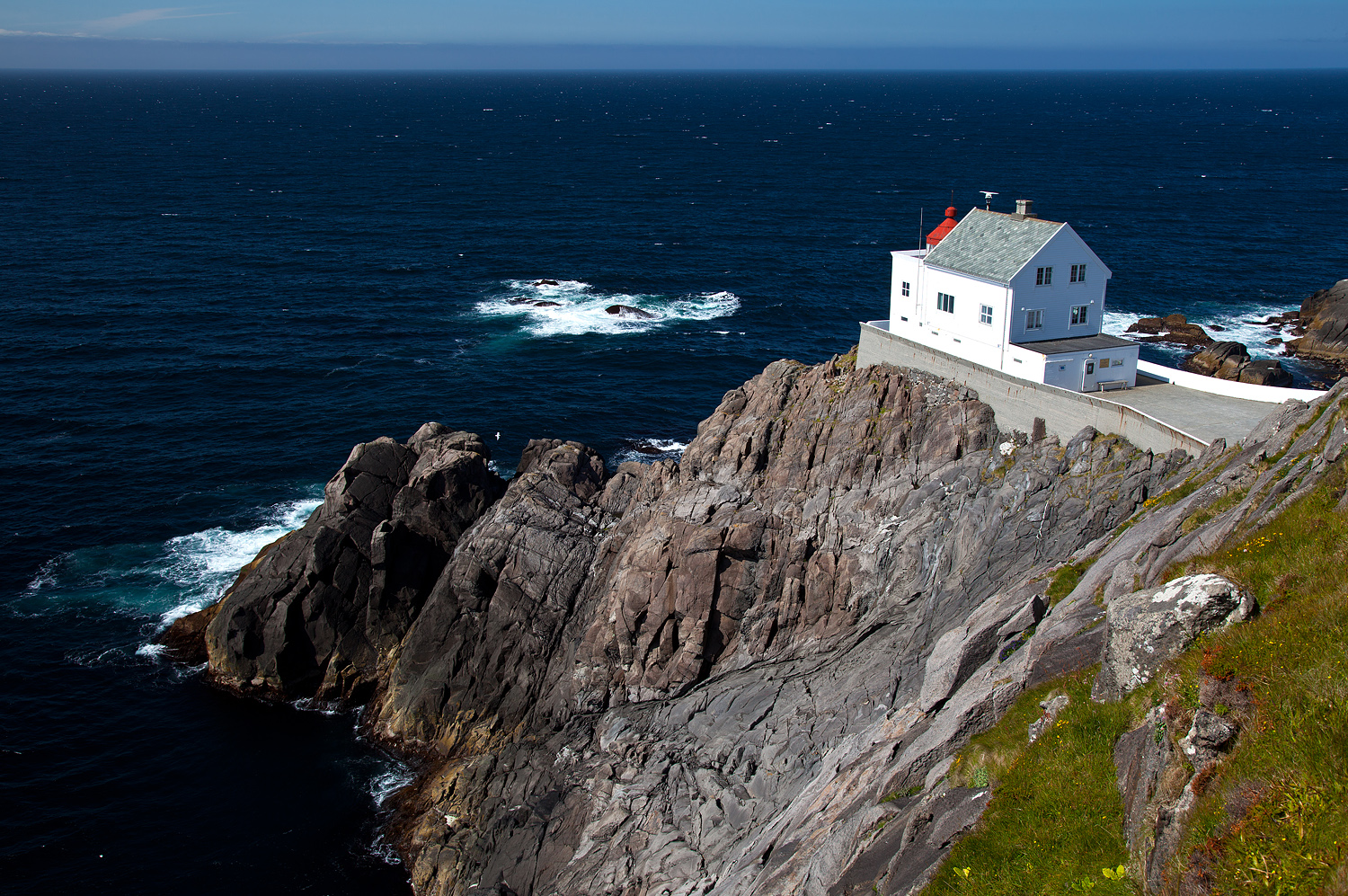
Kråkenes Lighthouse

The 10-metre (33 ft) tall lighthouse is attached to the seaward side of a 2 1/2-story wood keeper's house built into the rocky shoreline. The building is white and the lighthouse portion has a red roof. The light sits at an elevation of 42.5 metres (139 ft) above sea level and it emits a white, red or green light, depending on direction, occulting once every 6 seconds. The light can be seen for up to 12.8 nautical miles (23.7 km; 14.7 mi).

== See also ==
- List of lighthouses in Norway
- Lighthouses in Norway
