= Digerudgrunnen Lighthouse =

Demolished lighthouse in Norway

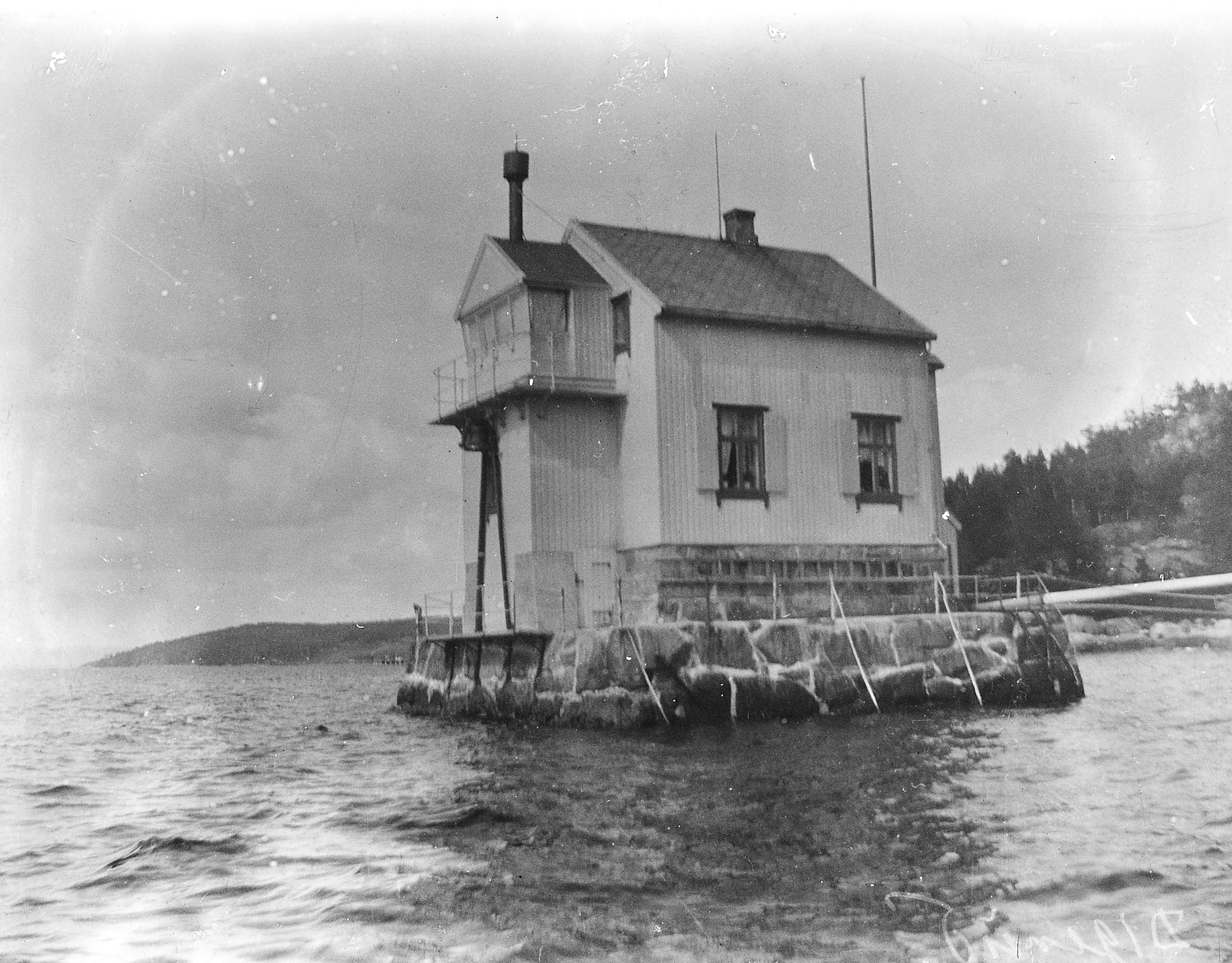
- Location: Frogn, Norway
- Coordinates: 59°43′10″N 10°35′10″E

Tower
- Constructed: 1871

Light
- Deactivated: 1975
- Range: 10.5 nmi
- Characteristic: Oc W 6s

Digerudgrunnen Lighthouse (Norwegian: Digerudgrunnen fyr) was a coastal lighthouse in the inner Oslofjord, in the municipality of Frogn in Akershus, Norway. It was established in 1871, and closed in 1975. The lighthouse is demolished.
