= Anden, Norway =

Island in Nordland, Norway

Anden
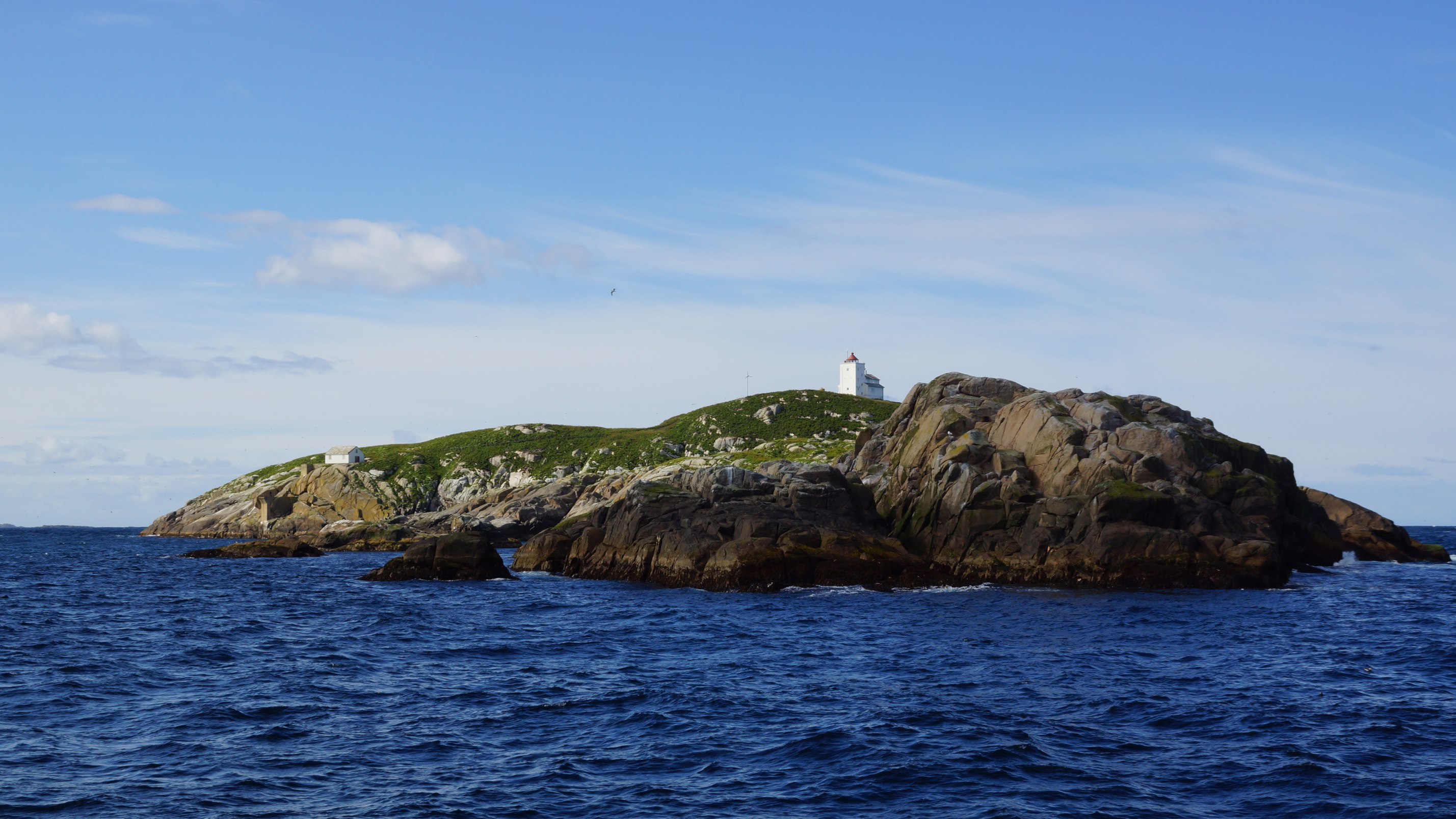
- Interactive map of Anden

Geography
- Location: Nordland, Norway
- Coordinates: 69.0658°N 15.1688°E
- Archipelago: Vesterålen
- Area: 0.153 km^{2} (0.059 sq mi)
- Length: 800 m (2600 ft)
- Width: 400 m (1300 ft)

Administration
- Norway
- County: Nordland
- Municipality: Øksnes Municipality
- IUCN category Ia (strict nature reserve)

Ramsar Wetland
- Official name: Anda
- Designated: 27 May 2013
- Reference no.: 2155

Anden (or historically Anda) is a small island in Øksnes Municipality in Nordland county, Norway. It lies in the Vesterålen archipelago, about 5 kilometres (3.1 mi) north of the village of Stø on the northern tip of the large island of Langøya, and about 14 kilometres (8.7 mi) west of the large island of Andøya. It is home to the Anda Lighthouse, which was the last lighthouse in Norway to be automated (in 1987).

== Environment ==
The 15.3-hectare (38-acre) island is protected as a nature reserve, and is an important nesting area for Atlantic puffin. Black-legged kittiwakes, razorbills, common shags, herring gulls, and black guillemots also nest there. The island has been designated an Important Bird Area (IBA) by BirdLife International (BLI). There is a large seal colony on the island.
