= Grimstad (surname) =

Grimstad is a Norwegian surname. Notable people with the surname include:

- Birgitte Grimstad (born 1935), Danish-born Norwegian musician
- Carl M. Grimstad (1856–1940), American politician
- Carl-Erik Grimstad (born 1952), Norwegian politician
- Edvard Grimstad (1933–2014), Norwegian politician
- Gudmund Grimstad (1898–1970), Norwegian wrestler
- Lars Joachim Grimstad (born 1972), Norwegian football midfielder
- May-Helen Molvær Grimstad (born 1968), Norwegian politician
- Oskar Jarle Grimstad (born 1954), Norwegian politician
- Per Ø. Grimstad (born 1934), Norwegian businessperson, diplomat and politician
- Renate Grimstad (born 1997), Norwegian golfer

== See also ==
- Grimstad (disambiguation)
