= Anda (play) =

Anda is an Israeli play written and directed by Hillel Mittelpunkt on 24 September 2008, on the stage of the Beit Lessin Theater.

== Plot ==
Nohi Carmi, an attorney on the prosecution committee of the Eichmann Trial in 1961, questions the witnesses invited to the trial. Carmi picks the witnesses whilst taking into account ethically legal motives-to what degree the witnesses accurately remember their holocaust experience, in a way that would allow them to provide the best and most reliable testimony. Feker, the government's contact for the prosecution in court, tries to promote the interests of the Mapai Political Party and the current Prime Minister of Israel David Ben Gurion. Feker, together with Nohi and Shenior (Nohi's boss), check the list of witnesses. Feker tries to remove Revisionist witnesses, in fear of them mentioning the Kastner trial, or witnesses that were against the Reparations Agreement between Israel and West Germany. He also receives a directive from the current foreign minister, Golda Meir, to connect between Amin al-Husseini and Adolf Eichmann.

Nohi's father, Shalom Weinshtok, introduces Nohi to Budapest-born Anda Freund, a survivor of Block 10 of the Auschwitz Concentration Camp, in which women were the subjects of several medical experiments. Anda wrote a diary during her time in Auschwitz, in which she describes her story and the medical experiments done to her and to other Jewish women in the block in great detail. Nohi finds Anda's testimony perfect for the trial.

On the other hand, Feker discovers that Anda's father was against Zionism, and that Anda herself partook in demonstrations against the Reparations Agreement and even joined the Herut movement. Nohi wants to invite Anda to testify, while on the other hand Feker, worried that her testimony would damage Mapai's reputation, wants to rule it out. Between the two we have the boss of Nohi's division, Shenior, who like Nohi, wants to ensure the prosecution ethically and duly carried out. However, Feker constantly pressures him by reminding him that he got his job not because of his legal skills, but because of his allegiance to Mapai, who on top of getting him his job, also got his children jobs in Paris. Feker commands Shenior to do as he says, otherwise he'd find a different Mapai member sitting in his office and his children unemployed.

The play's subplot circles Nohi's relationship with his fiancée Alona. Alona loves Nohi, though harbors a growing suspicion that due to him spending considerably large numbers of hours at work, that he is having an affair with Anda. Alona tries setting up a less time-consuming and tiring job for Nohi, at the civil market, where her father Mike works. Mike is a successful importer of agricultural equipment. Prior to Israel's independence in 1948, Mike, with the help of Feker, imported weapons into Israel, and currently deals with politics. Mike doesn't particularly like Nohi, but would gladly cooperate, as it would be for the sake of his daughter. In the background, Nohi's past as an immigrant, arriving at the Country of the Sabras is described. After immigrating to Israel at the age of 8 from Poland in a Youth Aliyah, he grew up in a Kibbutz, and later served in the army. He graduated from a faculty of law with honors, is currently working at the State Attorney's Office, and is engaged to Alona, the assistant of the PMO director Teddy Kollek. The cold relationship between Nohi and his father, who immigrated to Israel several years after him and is currently a tailor, are described. Nohi built a whole new life in Israel, which included Hebraizing his surname from Weinshtok to Carmi, in order to distance himself from his diasporic past, and started a career in law. Shenior consistently tries to convince Nohi to give up having Anda testify, and says the following lines in the play:

"It's rubbish though… half of the things that we wholeheartedly discuss and negotiate upon. The Mufti of Jerusalem, Ben Gurion's bolshevism, Begin's empty demagogy. Is that important? To whom? What's important? Me? You? That insect Feker? Even Eichmann himself isn't so important for this prosecution!"

Nohi asks him: "If so, then what is important?"

Shenior replies: "The people, the witnesses, the stories, only that is important."

Nohi asks him: "But you don't want her to testify, do you?"

Shenior answers: "Then why should she testify. She shouldn't testify! You shouldn't have her testify! This prosecution will start, and tens of witnesses will stand up, and tell their stories, of how they were tortured like this, and lost this and that, and were hungry and survived and shut up because they were ashamed of their own lives, and how you've left them out of your world to this day. Their story will be told in news reports nationwide and worldwide, on the radio, filling up newspapers for days and weeks…

A wall of silence may crack apart suddenly. People, people who live all around us like shadows could maybe go back to living like human beings. Think about it, perhaps you'll be starting… a whole new spirit, a spirit of listening, of compassion, you know what? Perhaps even generosity. Is that little to you? It's not important."

== Prizes ==
- The Israeli Theater Prize for best playwright of the year: Hillel Mittelpunkt.
- The Israeli Theater Prize for best play of the year: Anda
- The Israeli Theater Prize for best actor of the year: Keren Tzur

== Creators ==
- Director: Hillel Mittelpunkt
- Scenery Designing: Bambi Friedmann
- Costume Designing: Orna Samorgonsky
- Lighting Design: Keren Garnek
- Songwriter: Ori Vidislavski
