= Anda (surname) =

Anda is a Basque surname. Notable people with the surname include:

- Alfonso de Anda (born 1974), Mexican TV show host
- Béla Anda (born 1963), German journalist
- Carlos de Anda (1908–1995), Mexican sprinter who competed in the 1932 Summer Olympics
- Carr Van Anda (1863–1945), managing editor of The New York Times under Adolph Ochs
- Gabriel de Anda (born 1971), former Mexican soccer player
- Géza Anda (1921–1976), Hungarian pianist
- Gratian Anda (born 1969), Swiss business magnate and industrial heir
- Randi Anda (1898–1999), Norwegian politician for the Christian Democratic Party
- Rodolfo de Anda (1943–2010), Mexican actor most well known for his roles in the film La gran aventura del Zorro
- Torleiv Anda (1921–2013), Norwegian diplomat and politician
