= Anda Lighthouse =

Coastal lighthouse in Norway

Anda Lighthouse Anda fyrstasjon
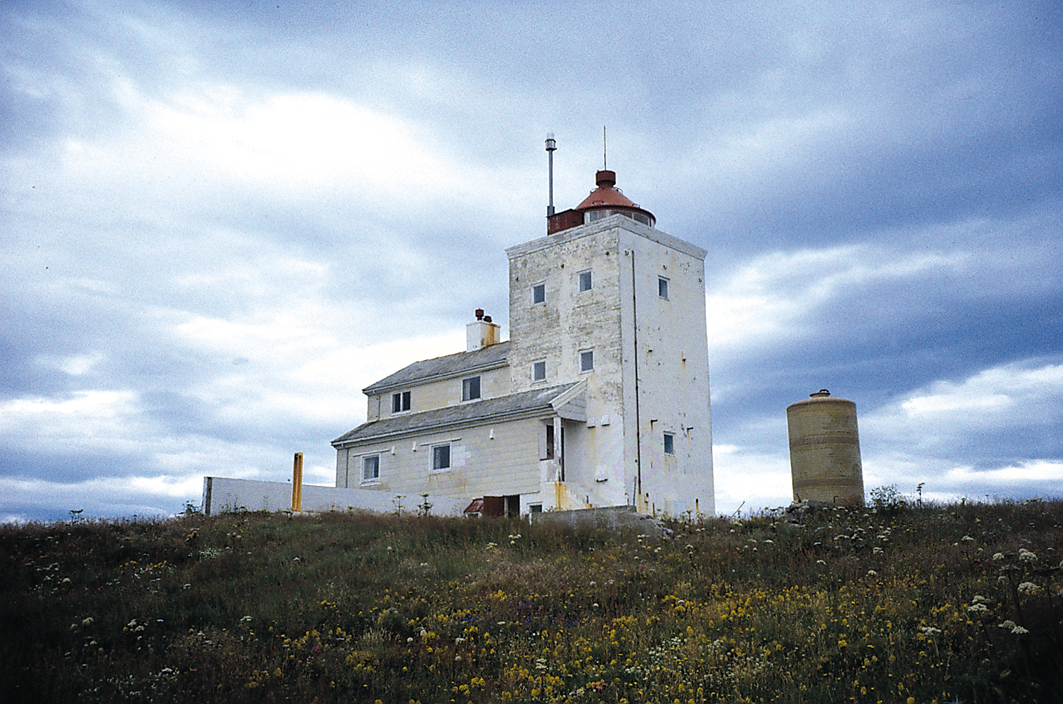
- View of the lighthouse
- Location of the lighthouse
- Location: Anden island, Øksnes Municipality, Nordland, Norway
- Coordinates: 69°03′59″N 15°10′12″E

Tower
- Constructed: 1932
- Foundation: Granite
- Construction: Concrete tower
- Automated: 1987
- Height: 16 metres (52 ft)
- Shape: Square tower
- Markings: White with red top
- Heritage: cultural heritage preservation in Norway
- Racon: T

Light
- Focal height: 49 metres (161 ft)
- Intensity: 55,200 candela
- Range: Red: 11.5 nmi (21.3 km; 13.2 mi) Green: 11 nmi (20 km; 13 mi) White: 14.2 nmi (26.3 km; 16.3 mi)
- Characteristic: Oc WRG 6s
- Norway no.: 813500

Anda Lighthouse (Norwegian: Anda fyrstasjon) is a coastal lighthouse in Øksnes Municipality in Nordland county, Norway. It is located on the island of Anden in the Vesterålen archipelago. The lighthouse was built in 1932 and it was the last new lighthouse that was built in Norway. When it was automated in 1987, it was the last staffed lighthouse station in the country. The lighthouse is square and of concrete construction, standing 16 metres (52 ft) tall.

The light is located on top of the 16-metre (52 ft) tall tower, sitting at an elevation of about 49 metres (161 ft). The white, red or green light (depending on direction) emits an occulting light once every 6 seconds. The lighthouse also emits a racon signal "T". The 55,200 candela light can be seen for up to 14.2 nautical miles (26.3 km; 16.3 mi). The lighthouse is state-owned, and has historic value as an example of period concrete construction. Although it has been modernised, many original elements remain. The ruins of an outhouse lie nearby.

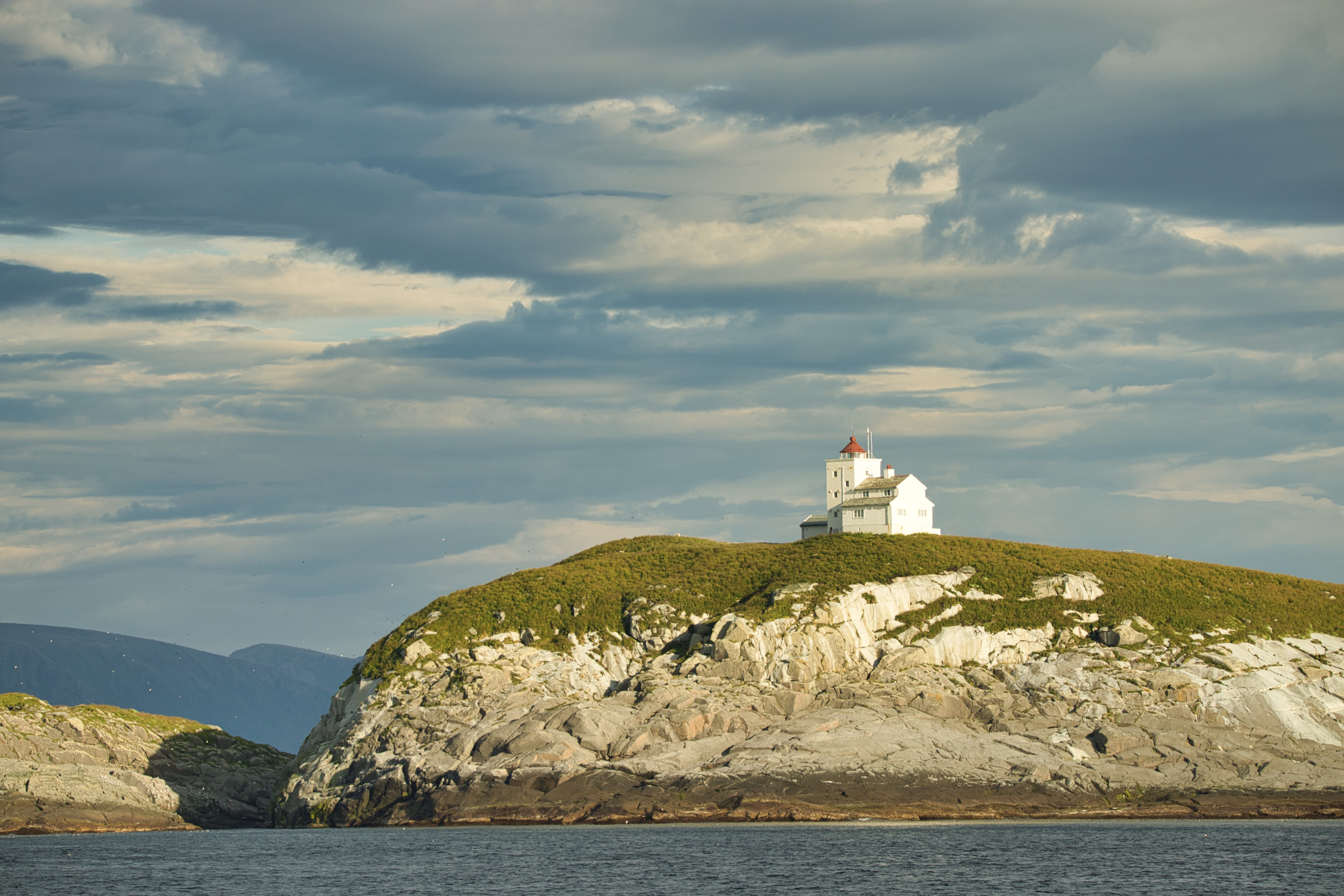
Anda Lighthouse in Vesterålen, Norway

== See also ==
- Lighthouses in Norway
- List of lighthouses in Norway
