= Runde Ramsar Site =

Group of protected areas in Norway

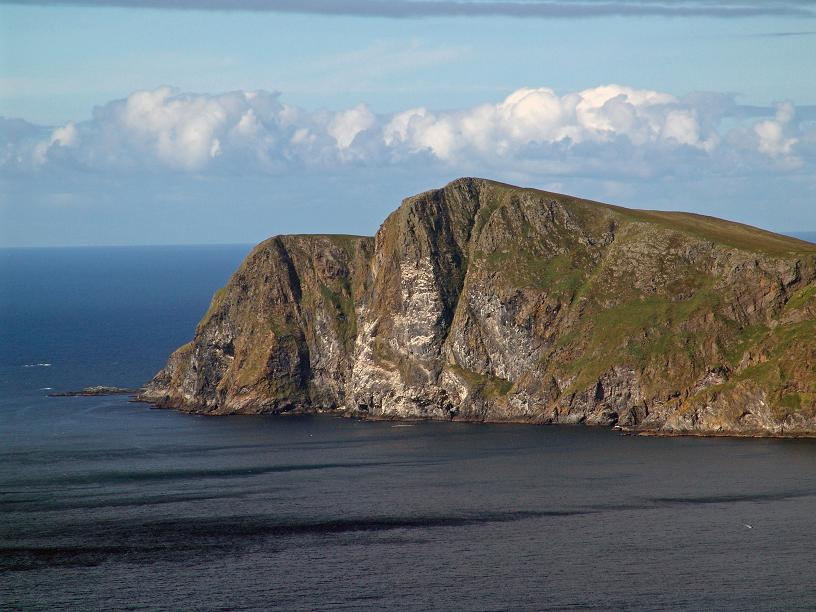
- Interactive map of Runde Ramsar Site
- Nearest city: Fosnavåg
- Coordinates: 62°23′00″N 5°37′00″E
- Area: 350 ha (860 acres)
- Established: 2013

Ramsar Wetland
- Official name: Runde
- Designated: 27 May 2013
- Reference no.: 2164

The Runde Ramsar Site is a Ramsar Convention area consisting of five previously approved protected areas in Herøy Municipality and Ulstein Municipality in Møre og Romsdal county, Norway. The area was established in 2013.

The five protected areas consist of four bird sanctuaries and one nature reserve, all of which are connected to the bird cliff island of Runde.

Four of the areas lie on the island of Runde in the municipality of Herøy: the Goksøyr Mires Nature Reserve, established in 1996, and the Runde West Side Bird Sanctuary, Runde North Side Bird Sanctuary, and Hellestien-Blåfjellet-Kløfjellet-Geita Bird Sanctuary. The fifth area, the Grasøyane Bird Sanctuary, lies in the municipality of Ulstein and encompasses the Grasøya island group with the islands of Grasøya and Skjærvøya and the surrounding skerries and sea. The four bird sanctuaries were all established in 1981.

Runde is the southernmost and third-largest of Norway's bird cliffs, with over 120,000 nesting seabirds. The most important species are the Atlantic puffin and black-legged kittiwake. There were 40,000 pairs of nesting kittiwakes in 2005 and 17,000 in 2010, and 100,000 pairs of puffins in 2005 and 81,000 in 2010.

Species such as the razorbill, common murre, and European shag are in decline, whereas species such as the northern gannet and great skua have recently become established. Many species of birds visit the islands while migrating, and a total of 230 species have been recorded here.
