= Runde North Side Bird Sanctuary =

Bird sanctuary in Norway

- Runde nordside fuglefredningsområde
- Interactive map of Runde North Side Bird Sanctuary
- Location: Runde, Herøy Municipality
- Nearest city: Fosnavåg
- Coordinates: 62.41129°N 5.597026°E
- Area: 33 ha (82 acres)
- Established: 1981

Ramsar Wetland
- Designated: 27 May 2013
- Part of: Runde
- Reference no.: 2164

The Runde North Side Bird Sanctuary (Norwegian: Runde nordside fuglefredningsområde) is a bird sanctuary and Ramsar site on the island of Runde in Herøy Municipality in Møre og Romsdal county, Norway. The area was protected in 1981 together with three other bird sanctuaries in order to "take care of rich and interesting bird life and a bird habitat, especially with respect to seabirds," according to the conservation regulations. The four sites have a total area of 2.6 square kilometers (1.0 sq mi).

The area covers the Skarveura ('cormorant slope') area on the north side of the bird cliff on Runde.

In 2013, the area was designated a Ramsar wetland site as one of five subareas of the Runde Ramsar Site.
