= Grasøyane Bird Sanctuary =

Protected area in Norway

- Grasøyane fuglefredningsområde
- Interactive map of Grasøyane Bird Sanctuary
- Nearest city: Ulsteinvik
- Coordinates: 62°25′23″N 5°44′50″E
- Area: 150 ha (370 acres)
- Established: 1981

Ramsar Wetland
- Designated: 27 May 2013
- Part of: Runde
- Reference no.: 2164

The Grasøyane Bird Sanctuary (Norwegian: Grasøyane fuglefredningsområde) is a bird sanctuary and Ramsar site in Ulstein Municipality in Møre og Romsdal county, Norway. The area is located northeast of the island of Runde and it was protected in 1981 together with three other bird sanctuaries in order to "take care of rich and interesting bird life and a bird habitat, especially with respect to seabirds," according to the conservation regulations. The four sites have a total area of 2.6 square kilometers (1.0 sq mi).

The area encompasses all of the islands, islets, and skerries in the Grasøya island group and the sea between the islands. The two largest islands are Grasøya and Skjærvøya. The Grasøya Lighthouse is located inside the protected area.

In 2013, the area was designated a Ramsar wetland site as one of five subareas of the Runde Ramsar Site.
