= Wave 4 =

Wave 4 often designates the fourth batch release of a product line or series, such as:

== Toys ==
- Ben 10 (toy line) § Wave 4
- Releases of Chia Pet toys
- G.I. Joe: A Real American Hero 25th Anniversary § Wave 4 (May/Jun 2008)
- Marvel Universe (toyline) § Wave 4
- Releases of Mighty Muggs toys
- Thor: The Mighty Avenger (toy line) § Wave 4
- Wolverine and the X-Men (toyline) § Wave 4
  - X-Men Origins: Wolverine (toyline) § Wave 4

== Software ==
- Windows Live § Wave 4
  - Windows Essentials § Windows Live Essentials 2011 (Wave 4)
  - Windows Live Mail § Version 2011 (Wave 4)

== See also ==
- Waves4Power
