= Goksøyr Mires Nature Reserve =

Protected area in Norway

- Goksøyrmyrane naturreservat
- IUCN category Ia (strict nature reserve)
- Interactive map of Goksøyr Mires Nature Reserve
- Location: Runde, Herøy Municipality
- Nearest city: Fosnavåg
- Coordinates: 62.407241°N 5.602900°E
- Area: 84 ha (210 acres)
- Established: 1996

Ramsar Wetland
- Designated: 27 May 2013
- Part of: Runde
- Reference no.: 2164

The Goksøyr Mires Nature Reserve (Norwegian: Goksøyrmyrane naturreservat) is located on the island of Runde in Herøy Municipality in Møre og Romsdal county, Norway. The reserve was established in 1996 to "take care of a bog area with a blanket bog, a bog type and bog vegetation that were common in coastal areas, but which, due to various forms of intervention, are now rarely found in good and typical condition", according to the conservation regulations.

The nature reserve encompasses the northwestern part of a mountain plateau on Runde. Blanket bog dominates the area, which has slopes as steep as 25°. The bog is a nesting area for the great skua.

In 2013, the area was designated a Ramsar wetland site as one of five subareas of the Runde Ramsar Site.
