= VOC ship Akerendam =

Ship sunk near the cliffs of Runde island (Norwegian west coast) 1725

Akerendam
History

Dutch Republic
- Name: Akerendam
- Owner: Dutch East India Company
- Launched: 1724
- Fate: Sank near the cliffs of Runde island (Norwegian west coast)

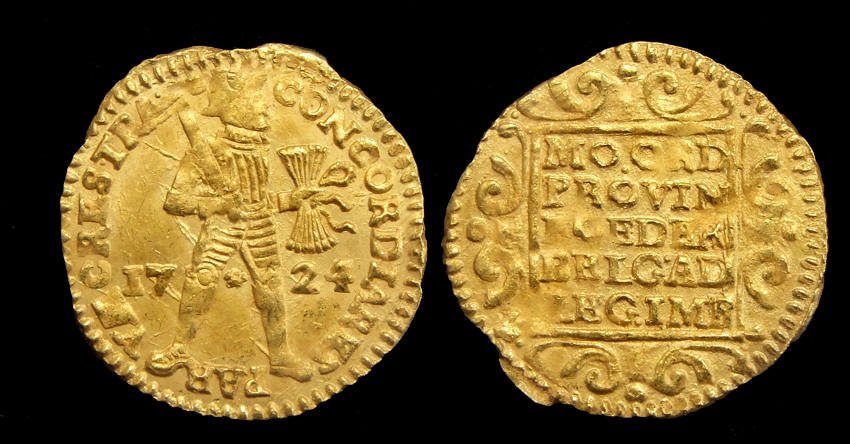
Netherlands, Utrecht, gold ducat 1724, recovered from the VOC shipwreck Akerendam

Akerendam was a ship of the Dutch East India Company (VOC), built in 1724. On 19 January 1725, Akerendam left in convoy with two other ships, heading for Batavia with a crew of 200 people and 19 chests of gold and silver on board. On 8 March 1725 Akerendam drifted in a snow storm and sank near the cliffs of Runde island (Norwegian west coast). Despite the fact that the ship was wrecked close to the shore there were no survivors.

During the next months, five chests of coins were recovered. No more was found and the site was forgotten until Swedish and Norwegian sports divers rediscovered the wreck site in 1972. Although little remained of the ship, about 57,000 gold and silver coins were recovered. The 6,600 gold coins were mostly the rare Dutch gold ducats, minted in Utrecht in 1724; prior to this find only a handful of these ducats were known. Norway's largest coin treasure is also referred to as "the Runde Treasure".

The Norwegian share of the Runde treasure was divided between the Museum of Cultural History's Coin Cabinet and Bergen Maritime Museum. In January 2011, some of the coins from the Maritime Museum were transported back to the island for an exhibition at Runde Miljøsenter. The divers' portion of 75% of the treasure was auctioned in Switzerland in 1978.
