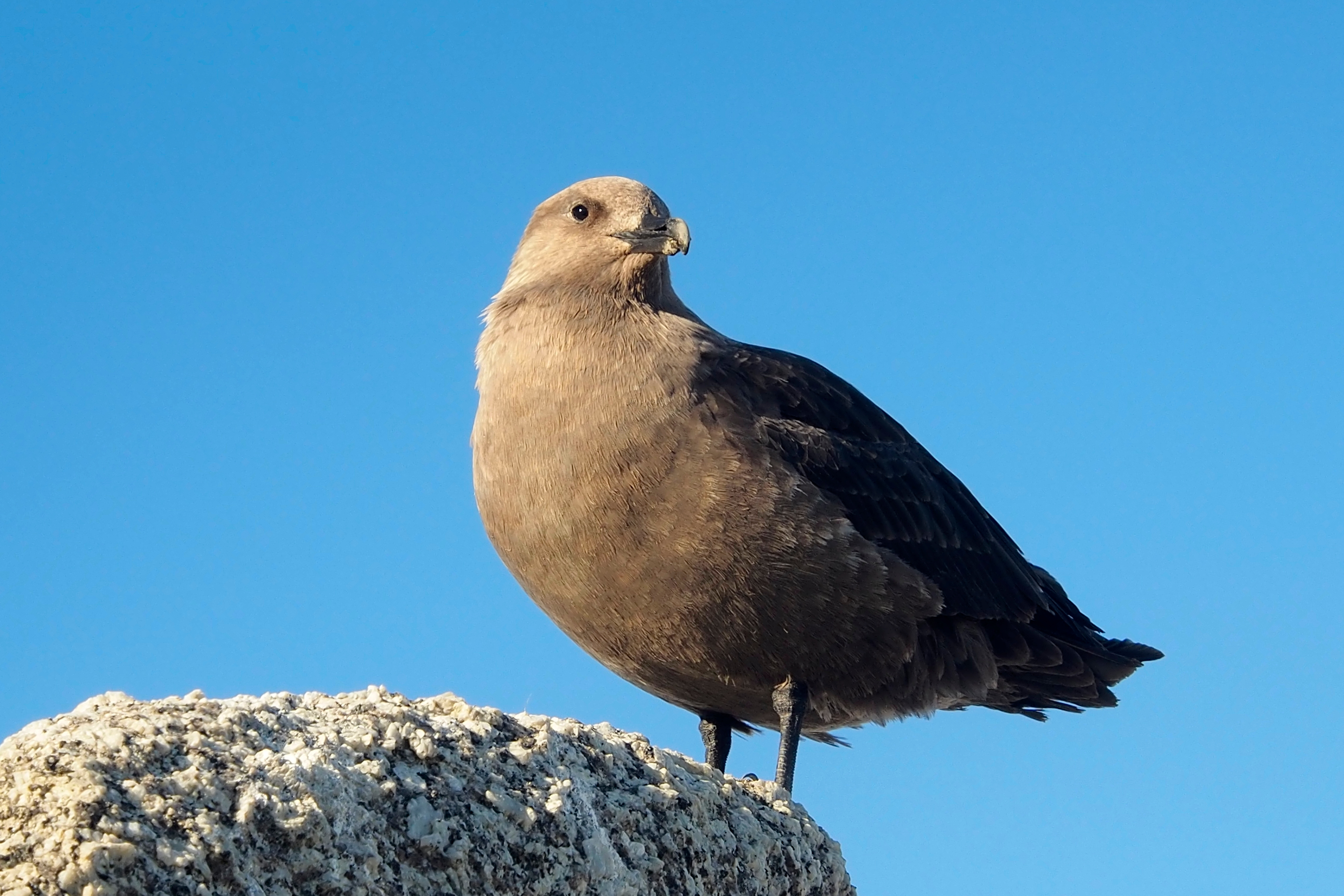
- A south polar skua in Terra Nova Bay

Conservation status
- Least Concern (IUCN 3.1)

Scientific classification
- Kingdom: Animalia
- Phylum: Chordata
- Class: Aves
- Order: Charadriiformes
- Family: Stercorariidae
- Genus: Stercorarius
- Species: S. maccormicki

Binomial name
- Stercorarius maccormicki Saunders, 1893

Synonyms
- Catharacta maccormicki

= South polar skua =

Species of bird

The south polar skua (Stercorarius maccormicki) is a large seabird in the skua family, Stercorariidae. An older name for the bird is MacCormick's skua, after explorer and naval surgeon Robert McCormick, who first collected the type specimen. This species and the other large skuas, such as the great skua, are sometimes placed in a separate genus Catharacta.

== Description ==
The south polar skua is a large bird (though small compared to other skuas sometimes placed in Catharacta) that measures around 53 cm (21 in) in length. Adults are greyish brown above, and have a whitish (pale morph) or straw-brown (intermediate morph) head and underparts, and the contrast between head and body makes it easy to separate from similar species with good views. Juveniles and adult dark morphs are harder to distinguish from their relatives, and more subjective or difficult-to-observe criteria, such as the colder brown plumage and blue bill base, must be used.

=== Identification ===
Distinguishing this skua from the Northern Hemisphere Arctic, pomarine, and long-tailed skuas is relatively straightforward. The large size, massive barrel chest, and white wing flashes of this bird are distinctive even at a distance. The flight is direct and powerful. Identification of this skua is more complicated when it is necessary to distinguish it from the closely related great skua of the North Atlantic, and the other large Southern Hemisphere skuas. Identification problems make claims of any Southern Hemisphere skua in the eastern North Atlantic problematic, and few records of south polar skua have been accepted in Western Europe. Similar problems occur, of course, with extralimital claims of great skua.

== Distribution and habitat ==
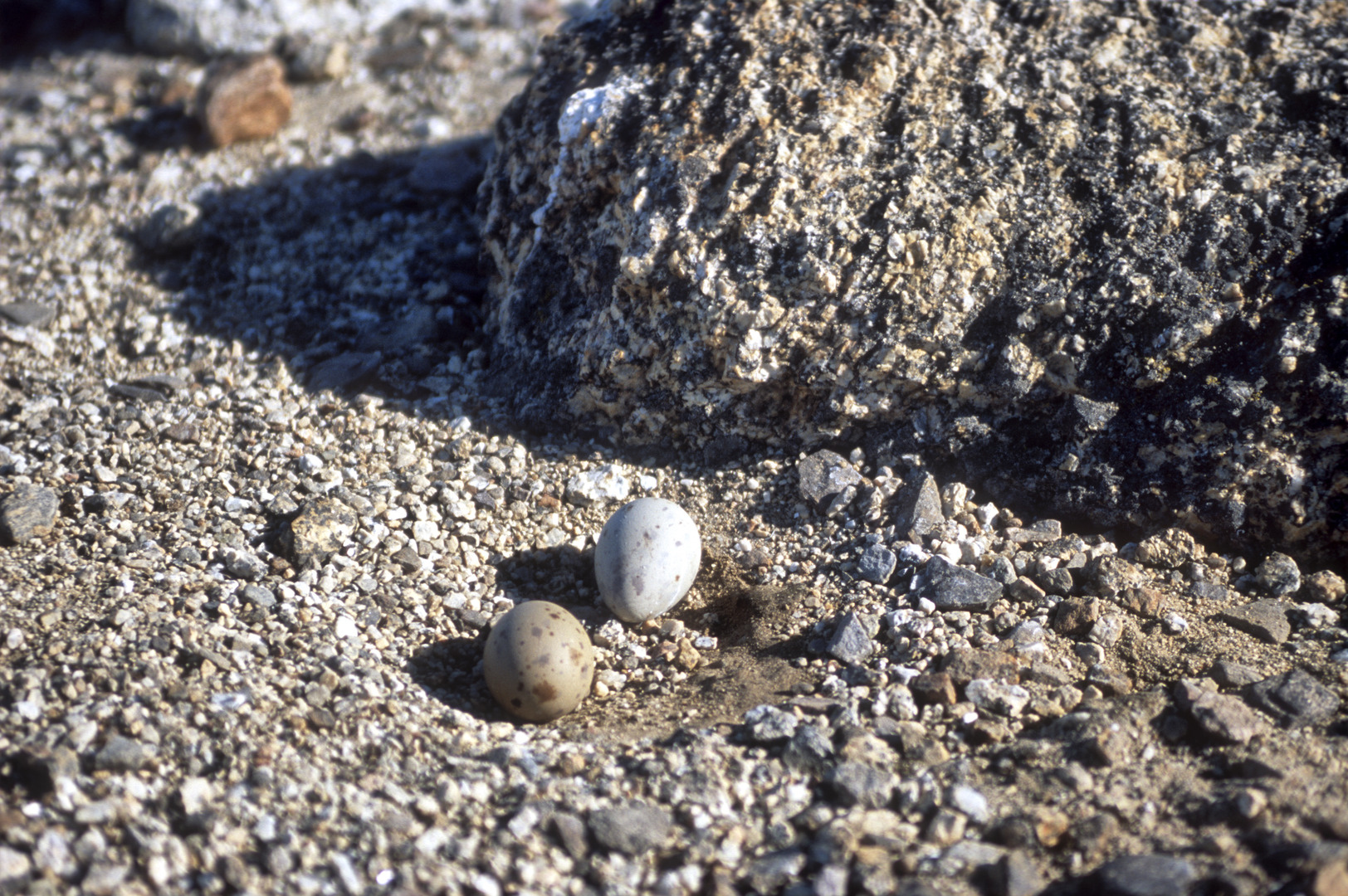
Skua eggs

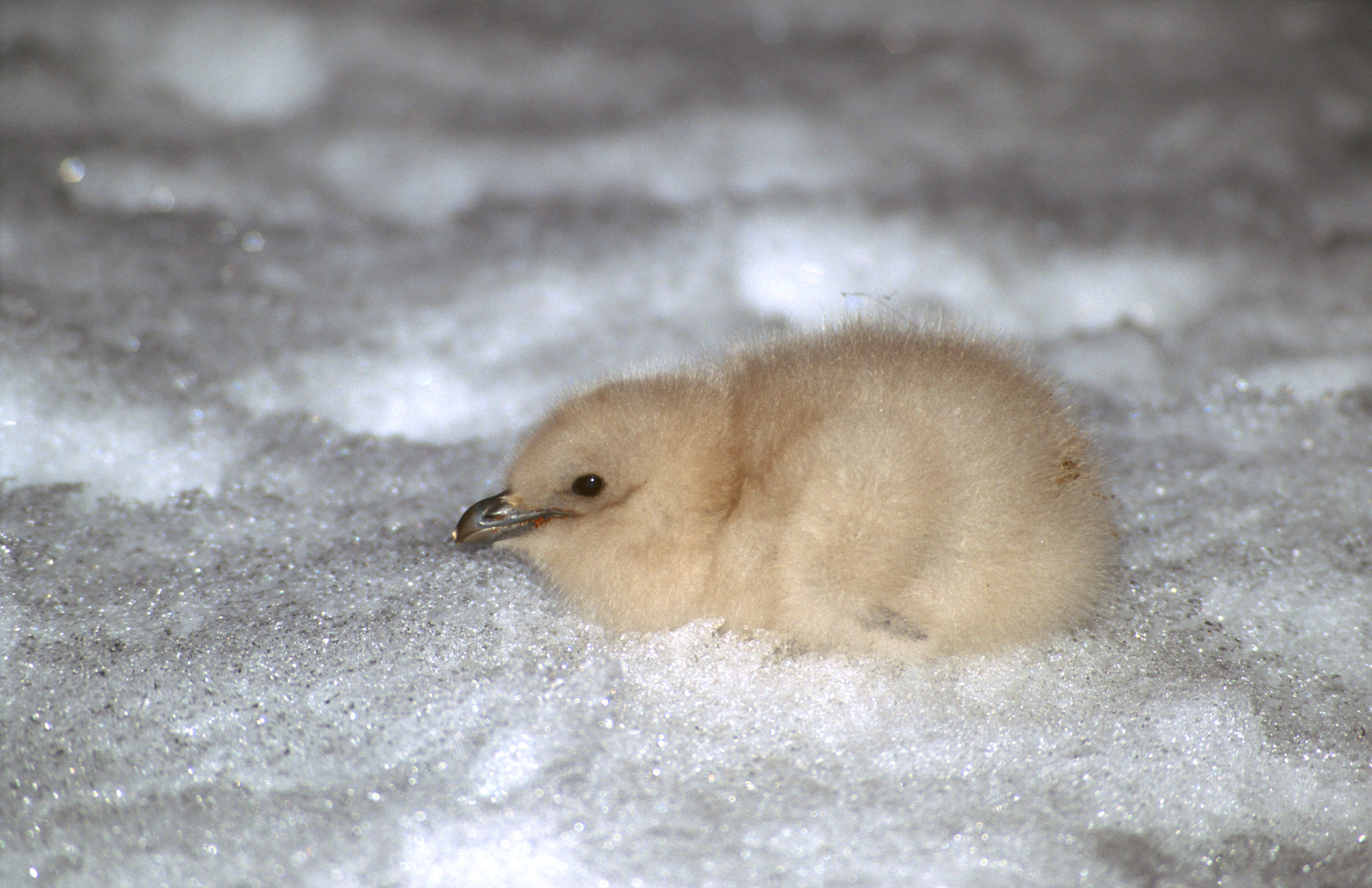
Skua chick

It breeds on Antarctic coasts, usually laying two eggs in November and December. It is a migrant, wintering at sea in the Pacific, Indian, and Atlantic Oceans. In the eastern North Atlantic, it is replaced by the closely related great skua (S. skua). South polar skuas have been seen at the actual Geographic South Pole. Megalestris Hill, on Petermann Island in the Wilhelm Archipelago of Antarctica, is named after an obsolete generic name for the south polar skua.

== Behavior ==
Like other skuas, it flies at the head of a human or other intruder approaching its nest.

=== Feeding ===
The south polar skua eats mainly fish, often obtained by robbing gulls, terns and even gannets of their catches. It also eats other birds, rabbits, and carrion. Like most other skua species, it continues this piratical behavior throughout the year, showing less agility and more brute force than the smaller skuas (jaegers) when it harasses its victims.
