= Grasøyane Lighthouse =

Coastal lighthouse in Ulstein, Norway

Grasøyane Lighthouse Grasøyane Fyrstasjon
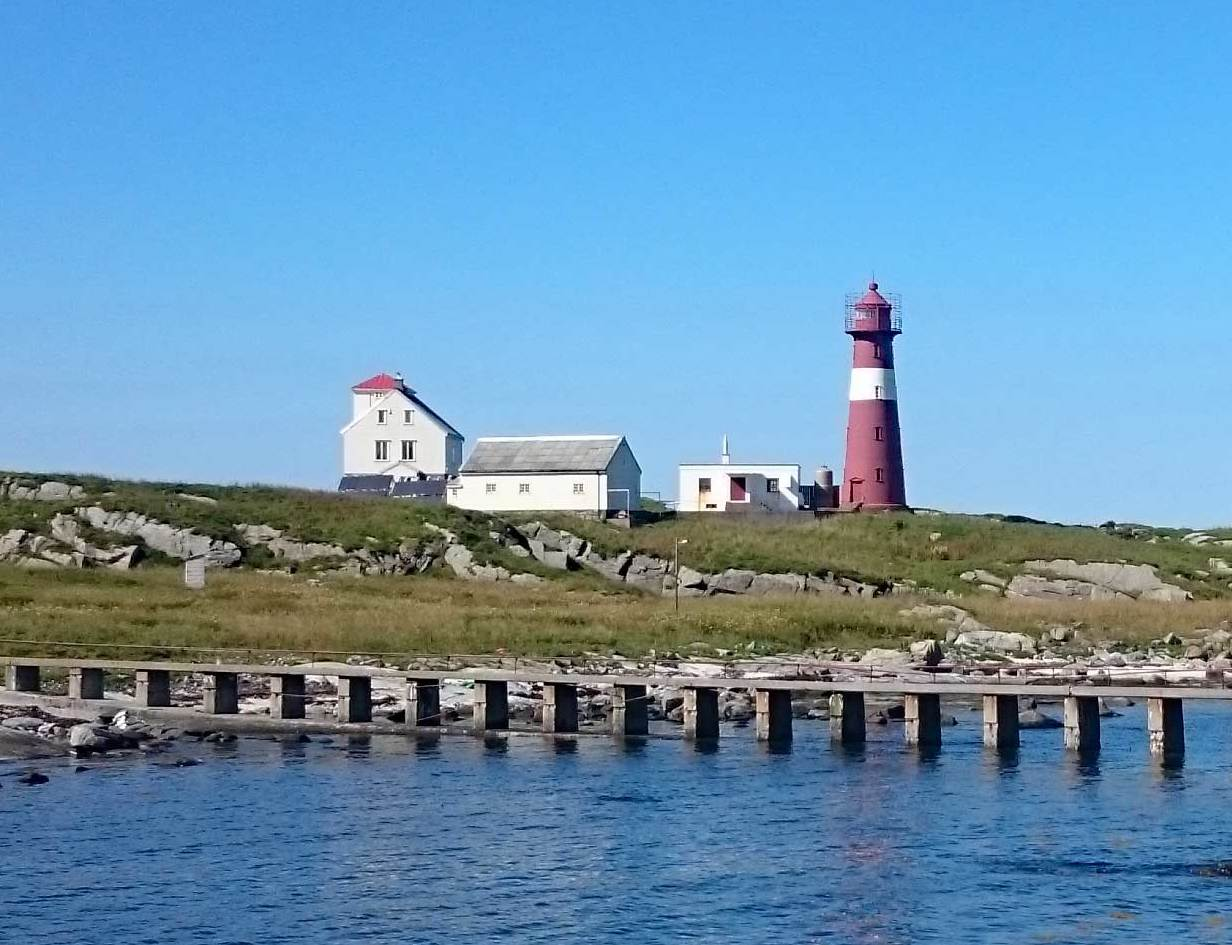
- Location: Ulstein Municipality, Norway
- Coordinates: 62°25′51″N 5°45′33″E

Tower
- Constructed: 1886
- Construction: cast iron
- Automated: 1986
- Height: 20.5 m (67 ft)
- Shape: cylinder
- Markings: Red, Stripe (1, white, horizontal orientation)
- Heritage: cultural property

Light
- First lit: 1950
- Focal height: 28.8 m (94 ft)
- Range: 12.6 nmi (23.3 km; 14.5 mi)
- Characteristic: Oc(2) WRG 8s

Grasøyane Lighthouse (Norwegian: Grasøyane fyr) is a coastal lighthouse in Ulstein Municipality in Møre og Romsdal, Norway. It sits on the small island of Grasøya, about 5.5 kilometres (3.4 mi) northwest of the island of Hareidlandet on which Ulstein Municipality is located and it is 9.1 kilometres (5.7 mi) east of Runde Lighthouse.

== History ==
The lighthouse was first established in 1886, it was damaged during World War II, rebuilt in 1950, and automated in 1986. The lighthouse was listed as a protected site in 1999.

The red and white lighthouse is 20.5 metres (67 ft) tall and the light sits at an elevation of 28.8 metres (94 ft) above sea level. The tower is round and made out of cast iron. This was the last cast iron tower built in Norway (and perhaps the last anywhere). The light emits a white, red or green light (depending on direction) occulting twice every 8 seconds. The light station was automated on its 100th anniversary in 1986.

== See also ==
- Lighthouses in Norway
- List of lighthouses in Norway
- Grasøyane Bird Sanctuary
