= Waves4Power =

Swedish wave power device devevloper

Waves4Power is a Swedish-based developer of buoy-based Offshore Wave Energy Converter (OWEC) systems. Ongoing research and development is done in collaboration with Chalmers University of Technology. A partnership with Dutch engineering specialist BnD-Engineering in 2021 aimed to commercialize and deploy the system on a global scale.

The device is a floating buoy with a long vertical tube containing a "water piston"; this is out of phase with the passing waves, allowing power to be generated.

A demonstration plant was installed in February 2016 at the Runde Environmental Centre in Norway. This was connected via subsea cable to the shore-based power grid. It was the first grid-connected wave energy project in Norway, on 2 June 2017, and rated at 100 kW.

In November 2017, testing of the WaveEl 3.0 was halted a month early due to damage to the anchor. This device went through 12,000 hours (almost 1½ years) of survivability demonstration, providing power into the Norwegian electricity grid for around 4,000 hours. The buoy was 3.0 metres (9.8 ft) in diameter.

In 2018, ongoing long-term grid-connected testing of a 100 kW Wave-EL prototype at Runde was reported.

In 2020, the company received a grant from the EU-funded Interreg Ocean DEMO project, enabling it to access the grid-connected test berths at EMEC for three years. The plan was to have six WaveEL devices connected via a hub and have the device certified by a classification society. However, as of September 2024, these tests have not happened.

In 2022, Waves4Power signed a memorandum of understanding with PLN Indonesia Power to develop wave energy parks.
