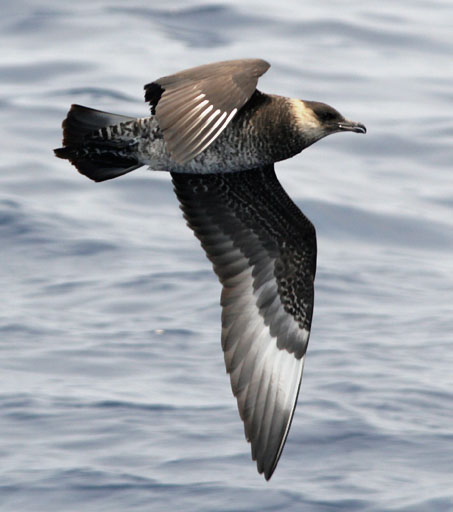
- Pomarine jaeger

Scientific classification
- Kingdom: Animalia
- Phylum: Chordata
- Class: Aves
- Order: Charadriiformes
- Suborder: Lari
- Family: Stercorariidae; Gray, 1871
- Genus: Stercorarius; Brisson, 1760

Type species
- Larus parasiticus Linnaeus, 1758

Species
- See text.

= Skua =

Skuas

Family of birds

The skuas (/ˈskjuːə/) are a group of predatory and kleptoparasitic seabirds with seven species forming the genus Stercorarius, the only genus in the family Stercorariidae. The three smaller skuas, the Arctic skua, the long-tailed skua, and the pomarine skua, are called jaegers in North American English.

The English word "skua" comes from the Faroese name for the great skua, skúgvur [ˈskɪkvʊɹ], with the island of Skúvoy renowned for its colony of that bird. The general Faroese term for skuas is kjógvi [ˈtʃɛkvɪ]. The word "jaeger" or Jäger is German for "hunter". The genus name Stercorarius is Latin and means "of dung"; (Note: The word stercorārius is from stercus ("dung"), which is also the etymon of stercoranism, stercobilin, stercoral, etc.) the food disgorged by other birds when pursued by skuas was once thought to be excrement.

Skuas nest on the ground in temperate, Antarctic, and Arctic regions, and are long-distance migrants. They have even been sighted at the South Pole.

== Biology and habits ==
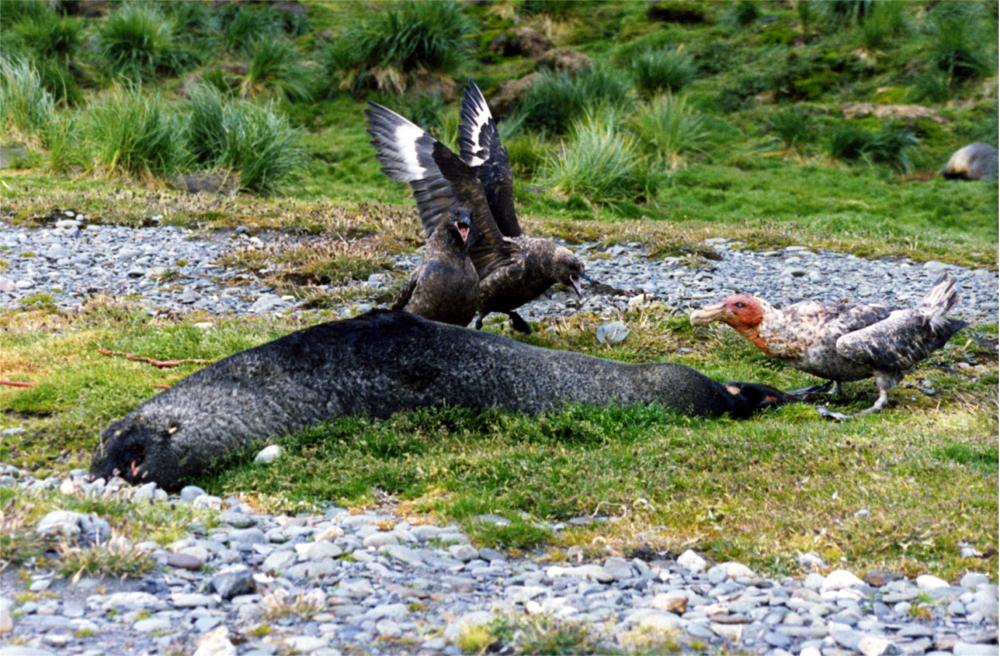
Two brown skuas (S. antarcticus) and a southern giant petrel (Macronectes giganteus) fighting over a dead Antarctic fur seal

Outside the breeding season, skuas take fish, offal, and carrion. Many practice kleptoparasitism, which comprises up to 95% of the feeding methods of wintering skuas, by chasing gulls, terns and other seabirds to steal their catches, regardless of the size of the species attacked (up to three times heavier than the attacking skua). Larger species, such as the great skua, regularly kill and eat adult seabirds, such as puffins and gulls and have been observed killing birds as large as a grey heron. On the breeding grounds, the three, more slender northern breeding species commonly eat lemmings. Those species that breed in the southern oceans largely feed on fish that can be caught near their colonies. The eggs and chicks of other seabirds, primarily penguins, are an important food source for most skua species during the nesting season.

In the southern oceans and Antarctica region, some skua species (especially the south polar skua) will readily scavenge carcasses at breeding colonies of both penguins and pinnipeds. Skuas are also notable for killing live penguin chicks and will also kill sick or injured adult penguins. In these areas, the skuas will often forfeit their catches to the considerably larger and very aggressive giant petrels. Skuas have also been observed to directly pilfer milk from the elephant seal's teats.

Skuas are medium to large birds, typically with grey or brown plumage, often with white markings on the wings. The skuas range in size from the long-tailed skua, Stercorarius longicaudus, at 310 grams (0.68 pounds), to the brown skua, Stercorarius antarcticus, at 1.63 kg (3.6 lb). On average, a skua is about 56 cm (22 in) long, and 121 cm (48 in) across the wings. They have longish bills with a hooked tip, and webbed feet with sharp claws. They look like large dark gulls, but have a fleshy cere above the upper mandible.

The skuas are strong, acrobatic fliers. They are generally aggressive in disposition. Potential predators approaching their nests will be quickly attacked by the parent birds, which usually target the heads of intruders – a practice known as 'divebombing'.

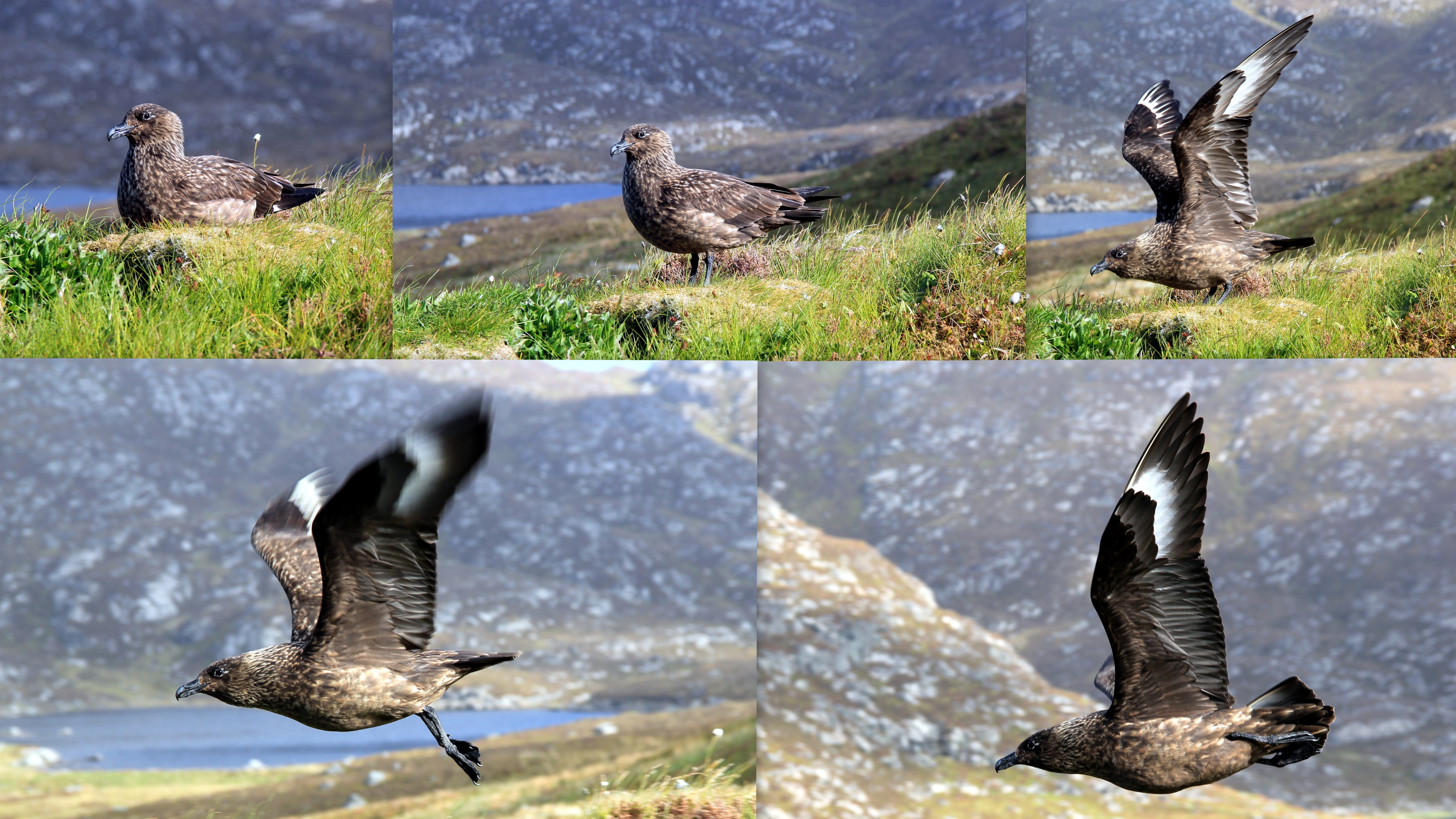
Great skua leaving the nest

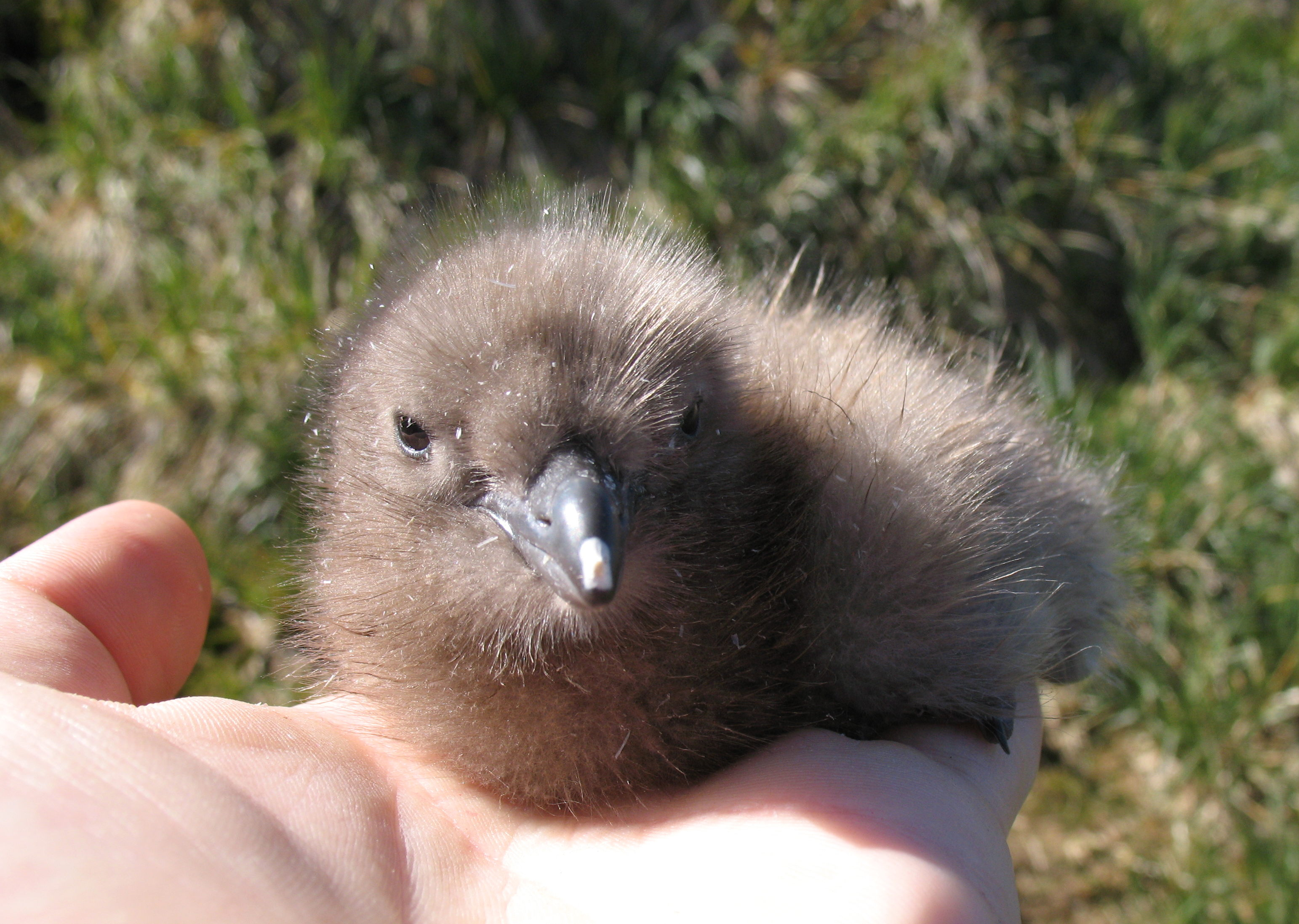
Skua nestling, with egg tooth still present on its beak

== Taxonomy ==
The genus Stercorarius was introduced by the French zoologist Mathurin Jacques Brisson in 1760 with the parasitic jaeger (Stercorarius parasiticus) as the type species.

Skuas are related to gulls, waders, auks, and skimmers. In the three smaller species, all nesting exclusively in the Holarctic, breeding adults have the two central tail feathers obviously elongated, and at least some adults have white on the underparts and pale yellow on the neck. These characteristics are not shared by the larger species, all native to the Southern Hemisphere except for the great skua. Therefore, the skuas are often split into two genera, with only the smaller species retained in Stercorarius, and the large species placed in Catharacta. However, based on genetics, behaviour, and feather lice, the overall relationship among the species is best expressed by placing all in a single genus. The pomarine and great skuas' mitochondrial DNA (inherited from the mother) is in fact more closely related to each other than it is to either Arctic or long-tailed skuas, or to the Southern Hemisphere species. Thus, hybridisation must have played a considerable role in the evolution of the diversity of Northern Hemisphere skuas.

== Species ==
The genus contains seven species:

Genus Stercorarius – Brisson, 1760 – eight species
Common name	Scientific name and subspecies	Range	Size and ecology	IUCN status and estimated population
Chilean skua	Stercorarius chilensis Bonaparte, 1857	Breeds along the coasts of southern Chile and southern Argentina, winters along the Pacific coasts of Peru and Chile as well as the Atlantic coast of Argentina	Size: Habitat: Diet:	LC
South polar skua	Stercorarius maccormicki Saunders, 1893	Breeds along the coast on Antarctica, winters in the north Atlantic and north Pacific	Size: Habitat: Diet:	LC
Brown skua	Stercorarius antarcticus (Lesson, 1831) Three subspecies: S. a. antarcticus (Lesson, 1831); S. a. hamiltoni (Hagen, 1952); S. a. lonnbergi (Mathews, 1912)	Southern Ocean	Size: Habitat: Diet:	LC
Great skua	Stercorarius skua (Brünnich, 1764)	Breeds along the coastline of the northeast Atlantic, winters in the north Atlantic	Size: Habitat: Diet:	LC
Pomarine jaeger or pomarine skua	Stercorarius pomarinus (Temminck, 1815)	Breeds along the Arctic coastline, winters in tropical and subtropical oceans	Size: Habitat: Diet:	LC
Parasitic jaeger or Arctic skua	Stercorarius parasiticus (Linnaeus, 1758)	Breeds along the Arctic coastline, winters in the southern hemisphere	Size: Habitat: Diet:	LC
Long-tailed jaeger or long-tailed skua	Stercorarius longicaudus Vieillot, 1819 Two subspecies: S. l. longicaudus Vieillot, 1819.; S. l. pallescens Løppenthin, 1932	Breeds in the Arctic, winters in the Southern Ocean	Size: Habitat: Diet:	LC
