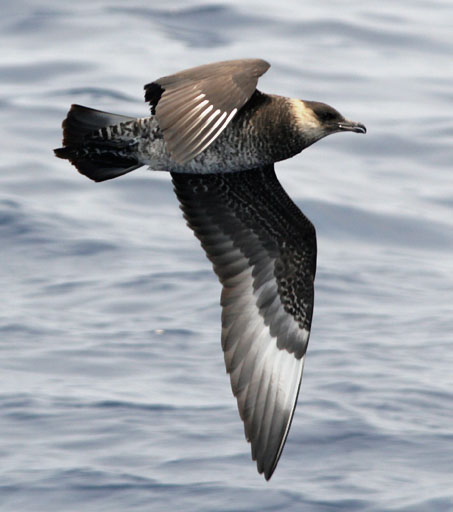

Conservation status
- Least Concern (IUCN 3.1)

Scientific classification
- Kingdom: Animalia
- Phylum: Chordata
- Class: Aves
- Order: Charadriiformes
- Family: Stercorariidae
- Genus: Stercorarius
- Species: S. pomarinus

Binomial name
- Stercorarius pomarinus (Temminck, 1815)
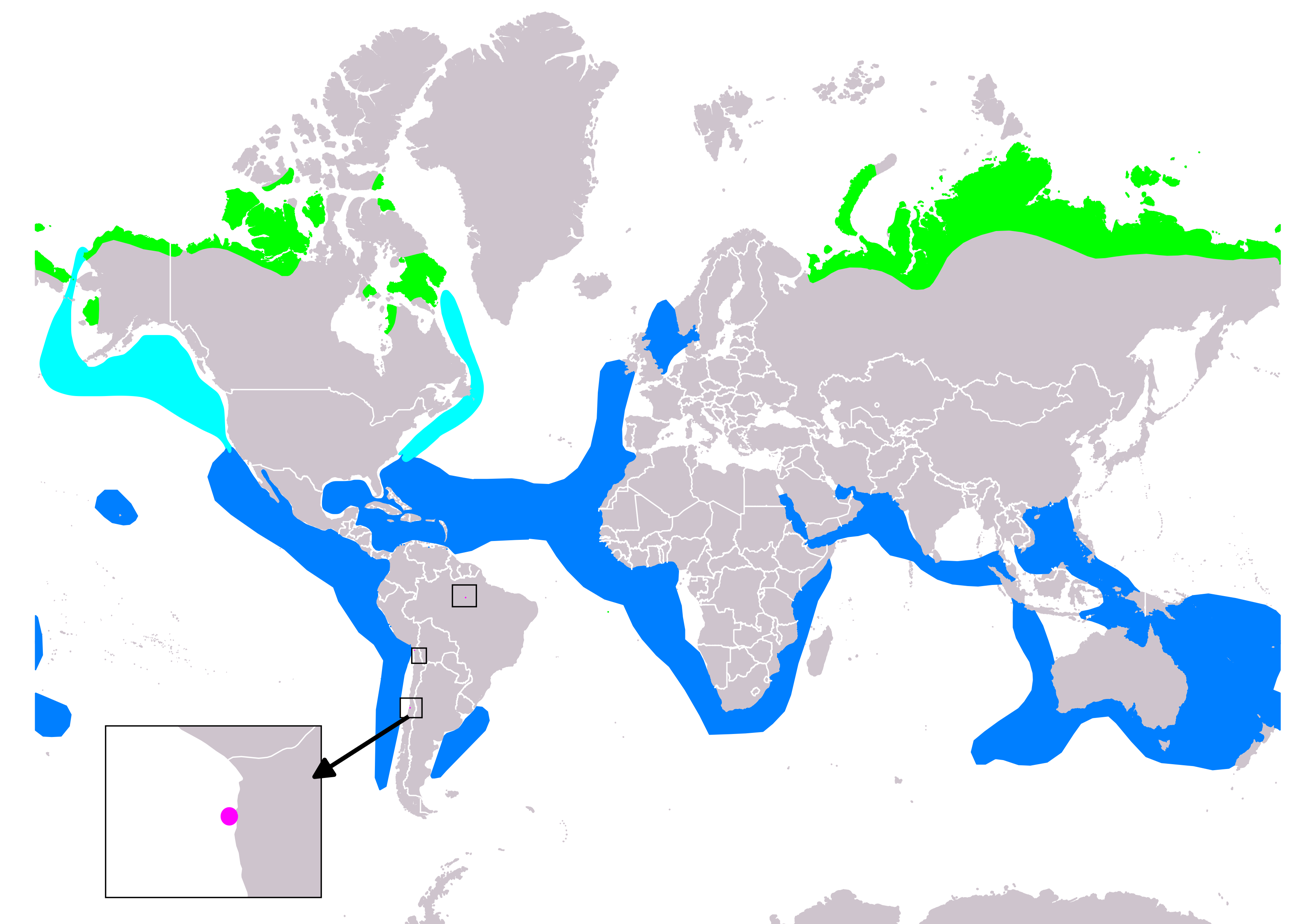
- Range of S. pomarinus Breeding Non-breeding Passage Vagrant (seasonality uncertain)

Synonyms
- Catharacta pomarinus; Coprotheres pomarinus

= Pomarine jaeger =

Species of bird

The pomarine jaeger (Stercorarius pomarinus), pomarine skua, or pomatorhine skua, is a seabird in the skua family Stercorariidae. It is a migrant, wintering at sea in the tropical oceans.

== Taxonomy ==
The pomarine jaeger is most closely related to the larger skuas (species formerly placed in a separate genus Catharacta: great skua, Chilean skua, brown skua, and south polar skua). Together, the pomarine jaeger and the larger skuas are sister to the two smaller skua species, the parasitic jaeger and long-tailed jaeger.

The evolutionary relationships of the pomarine jaeger were formerly controversial. Based on plumage similarity between the pomarine jaeger and the two smaller jaegers (long-tailed jaeger and parasitic jaeger), the three jaegers were formerly placed in a separate genus from the larger skuas (with the jaegers in Stercorarius and the larger skuas in the former genus Catharacta). However, behavioural evidence was recognized early on as suggesting a link between the pomarine jaeger and the larger skuas: for example, both pomarine jaeger and great skuas perform wing-raising displays, a behaviour that is absent in the two smaller jaegers. Skeletal data also hinted at a closer relationship between pomarine jaeger and the larger skuas. Later, the mitochondrial DNA of the pomarine jaeger was found to be most similar to the great skua, not the smaller jaegers. Based on these patterns, it was proposed that the pomarine jaeger originated through hybridization between the great skua and either the long-tailed or parasitic jaeger; or alternatively, that the great skua originated through hybridization of the pomarine jaeger and one of the southern hemisphere skuas. Under the hybrid origin scenarios, the hybrid population would have eventually evolved into a distinct species. Whole genome sequencing later revealed that the mitochondrial DNA similarity between the pomarine jaeger and the great skua was most likely due to hybrid introgression from the pomarine jaeger into the great skua, with the mitochondrial DNA of the pomarine jaeger replacing that of the great skua. The whole genome data rejected a hybrid origin for the pomarine jaeger, with no evidence of parasitic jaeger or long-tailed jaeger ancestry within the pomarine jaeger, but instead supported a low level of hybrid introgression between the pomarine jaeger and great skua.

== Etymology ==
The word "jaeger" is derived from the German word Jäger, meaning "hunter". The genus name Stercorarius is Latin and means "of dung"; the food disgorged by other birds when pursued by skuas was once thought to be excrement. The specific Pomatorhinus is from Ancient Greek poma, pomatos, "lid" and rhis, rhinos, "nostrils". This refers to the cere, which the pomarine jaeger shares with the other skuas. Although it is sometimes erroneously referred to as the Pomeranian skua, the name of this species is unrelated to the Baltic Sea region of Pomerania.

== Description ==
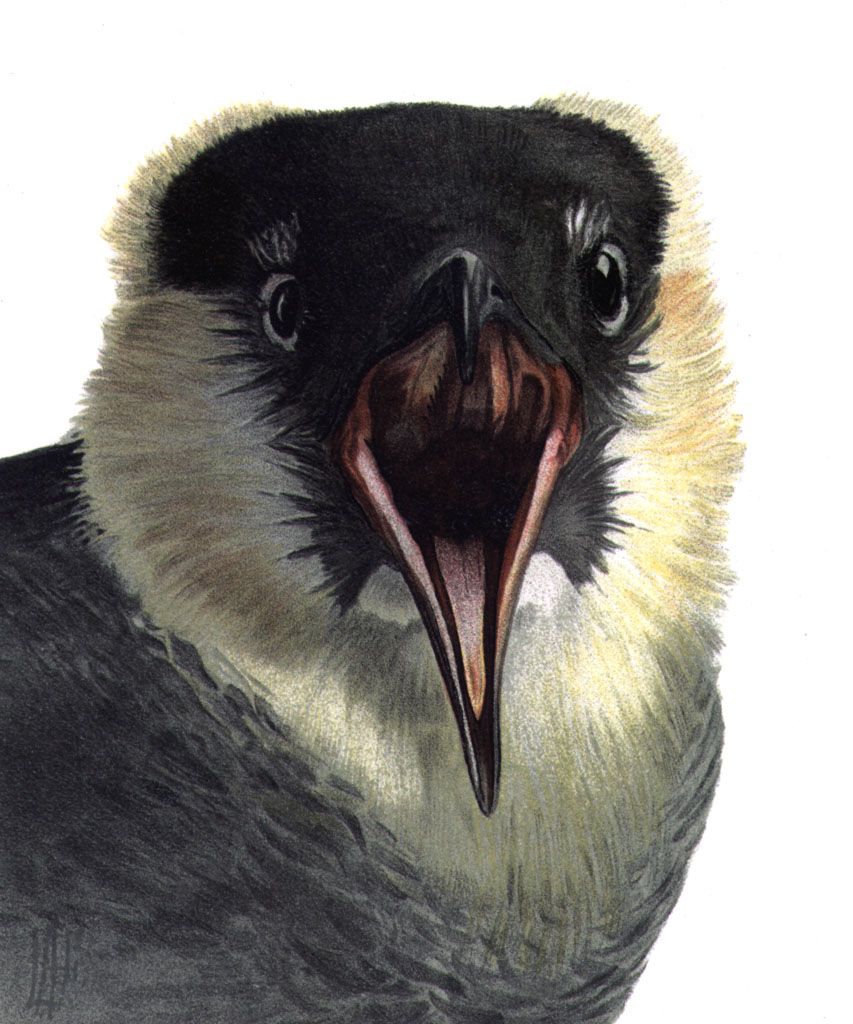
This is a large skua at about 45cm length, excluding the central tail feathers of the summer adult, which can add another 10cm or so.

This species ranges from 46 to 67 cm (18 to 26 in) in length, 110 to 138 cm (43 to 54 in) in wingspan and 540–920 g (1.19–2.03 lb) in weight. The upper limit of the length includes the elongated tail streamer of breeding adults, which is about 10 cm (3.9 in) in length. Identification of this jaeger is complicated by its similarities to parasitic jaeger and the existence of three morphs. Pomarine jaegers are larger than common gulls. They are much bulkier, broader-winged and less falcon-like than the parasitic jaeger, but show the same wide range of plumage variation. The flight is more measured than that of the smaller species. It has many harsh chattering calls and others which sounds like which-yew.

Light-morph adult pomarine jaegers have a brown back, mainly white underparts and dark primary wing feathers with a white "flash". The head and neck are yellowish-white with a black cap. Dark morph adults are dark brown, and intermediate morph birds are dark with somewhat paler underparts, head and neck. All morphs have the white wing flash, which appears as a diagnostic double flash on the underwing. In breeding adults of all morphs, the two central tail feathers are much longer than the others, spoon-shaped, and twisted from the horizontal. Juveniles are even more problematic to identify, and are difficult to separate from parasitic jaegers at a distance on plumage alone.

== Behaviour ==
=== Breeding ===
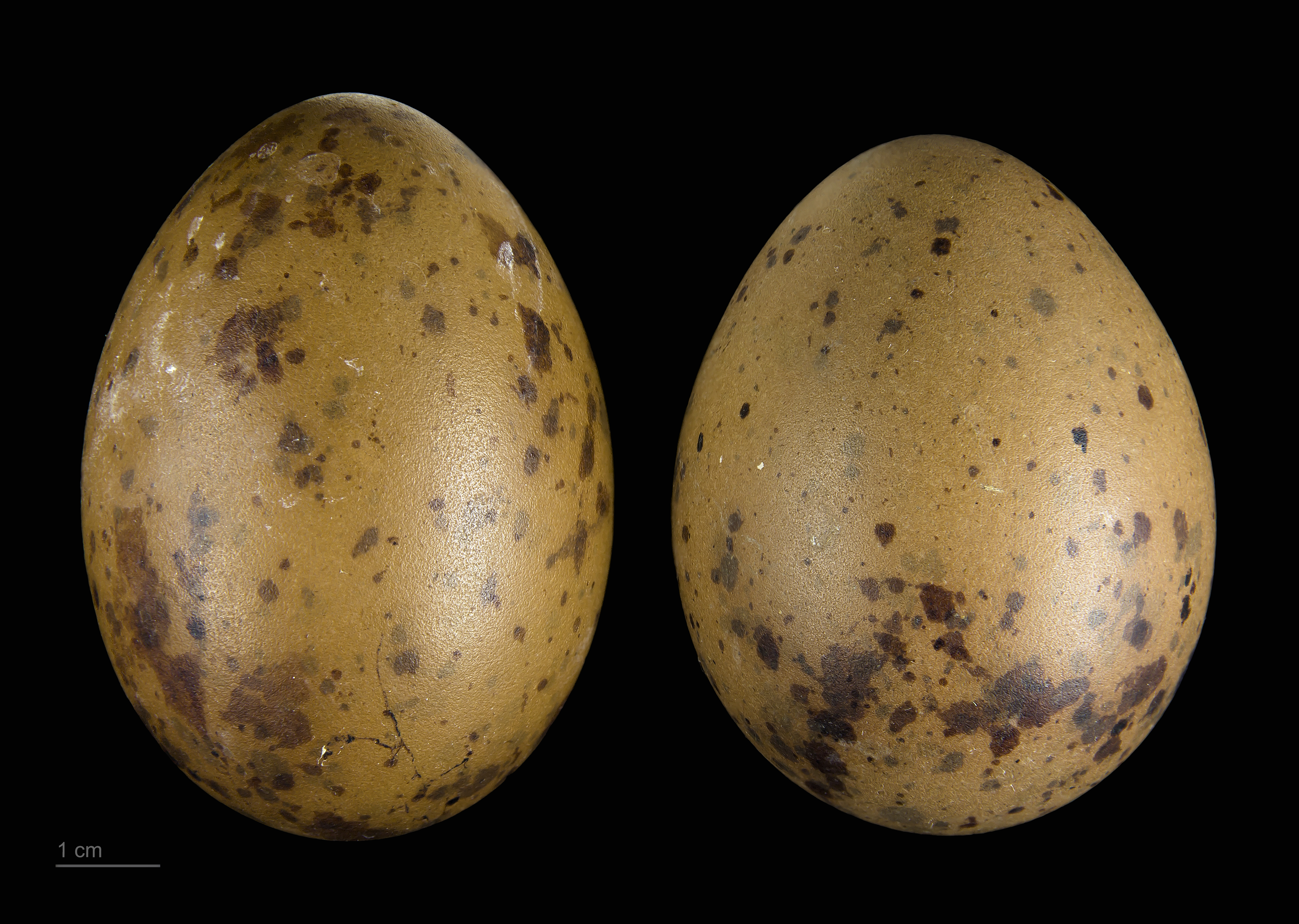
Stercorarius pomarinus - MHNT

This species breeds in the far north of Eurasia and North America. It nests on Arctic tundra and islands, laying 2–3 olive-brown eggs in grass lined depressions. Like other skuas, it will fly at the head of a human or other intruder approaching its nest. Although it cannot inflict serious damage, the experience is frightening and painful.

=== Feeding ===
This bird feeds on fish, carrion, scraps, smaller birds up to the size of common gull and rodents, especially lemmings. It robs gulls, terns and even gannets of their catches. Like most other skua species, it continues this piratical behaviour throughout the year, showing great agility as it harasses its victims. Only the great black-backed gull, white-tailed eagle and golden eagle are known to take adult, healthy pomarine jaeger.
