= Runde Environmental Centre =

Research station in Norway

Coordinates: 62°23′57″N 5°39′37″E

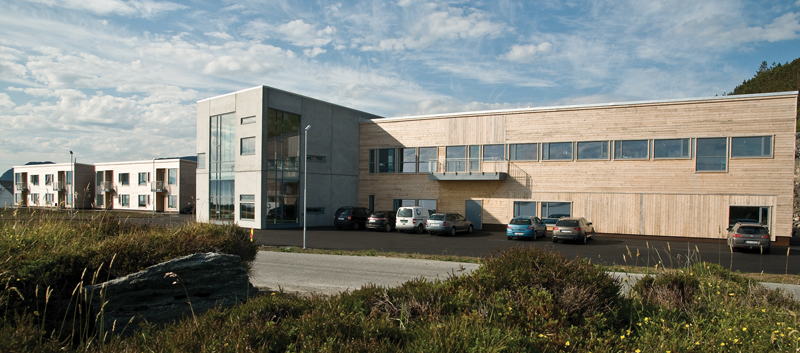
Runde Environmental Centre

Runde Environmental Centre (Norwegian: Runde Miljøsenter) is a research station at the Norwegian island of Runde. The centre has four main activities: a marine station, a house and hub for small spin-off businesses, an information centre, and a conference/overnight centre with 34 hotel-standard rooms in 8 apartment suites. The island of Runde is located in Herøy Municipality in Møre og Romsdal county, Norway. It is about 15 kilometres (9.3 mi) north of Fosnavåg.

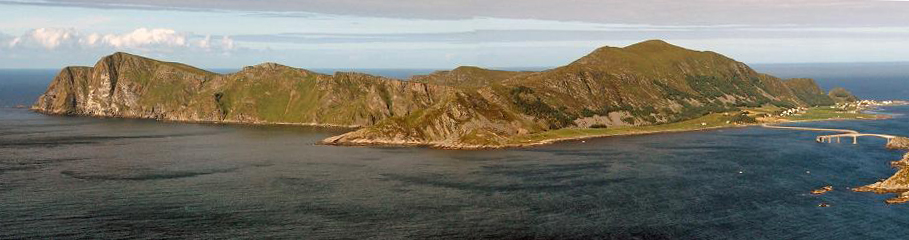
Runde island

== Research Activity ==
The marine station is the dominant activity at the Centre. The research activity will be funded by independent project funding, governmental grants, and by contributions from visiting scientists and institutes. The scientific plan (long term monitoring) calls for work to be done in the fields of meteorology, oceanography, marine pollution, seabird monitoring, marine biology, rocky shore monitoring, and renewable energy, as well as for a survey of plankton, fish, sea mammals, and terrestrial flora.

== Tourist Information ==
The tourist information centre for the island is located in the Environmental Centre.
