= Runde Lighthouse =

Lighthouse in Møre og Romsdal, Norway

Runde Lighthouse Rundøy fyr
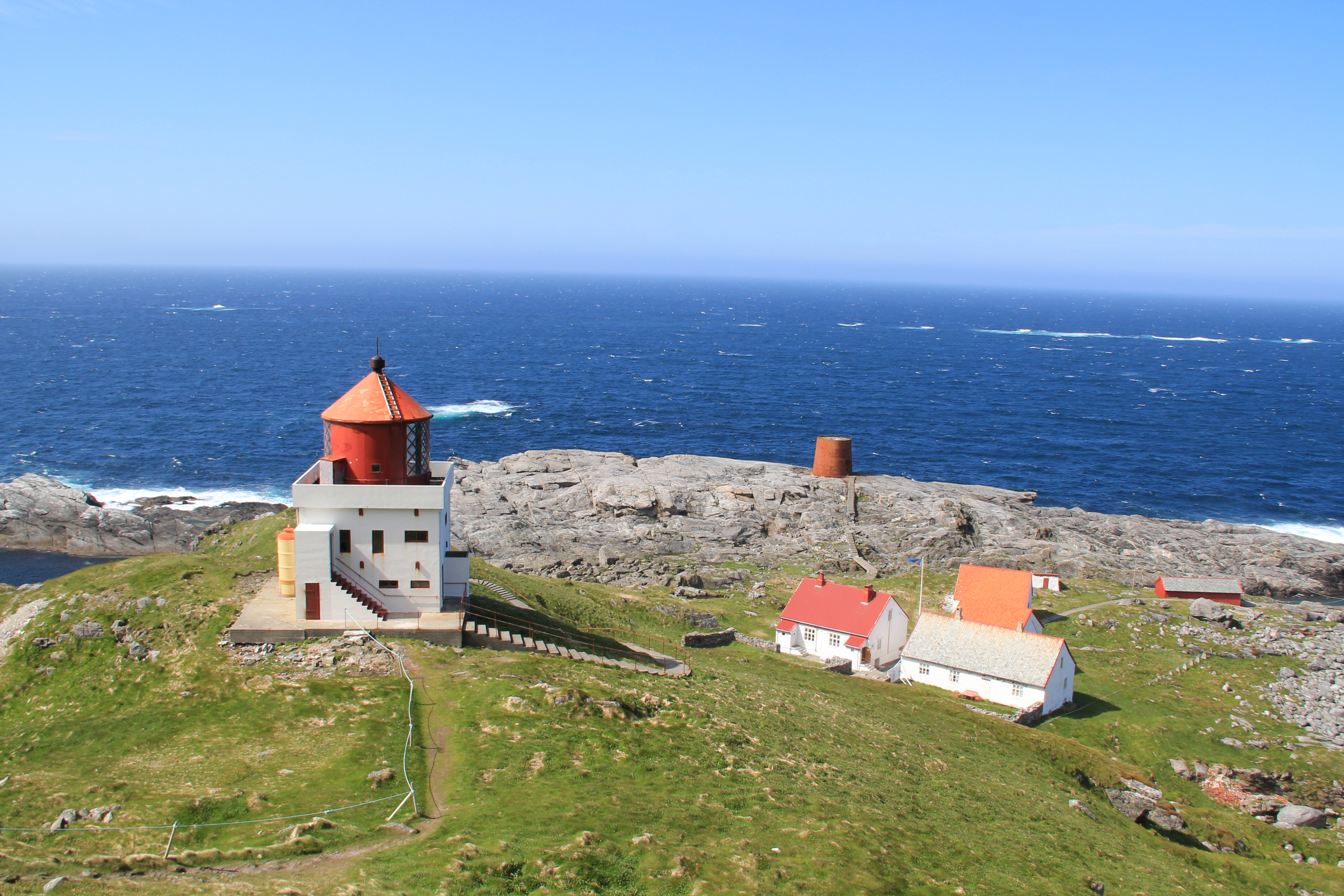
- Runde Lighthouse
- Location: Herøy Municipality, Norway
- Coordinates: 62°24′53″N 5°35′02″E

Tower
- Constructed: 1767 (first); 1826 (second); 1858 (third)
- Construction: masonry
- Automated: 2002
- Height: 14 m (46 ft)
- Shape: square tower with balcony and lantern
- Markings: white tower, red lantern
- Heritage: cultural property, heritage site in Norway

Light
- First lit: 1935
- Focal height: 50 m (160 ft)
- Intensity: 200,200 cd
- Range: 19 nmi (35 km; 22 mi) (white), 15 nmi (28 km; 17 mi) (red), 16 nmi (30 km; 18 mi) (green)
- Characteristic: Oc WRG 6s

Runde Lighthouse (Norwegian: Runde fyr) is a coastal lighthouse located on the island Runde in Herøy Municipality in Møre og Romsdal, Norway. It was first lit in 1767. The lighthouse was automated in 2002; the residential buildings were vacated and have since been used as a self-service tourist station.

== See also ==
- List of lighthouses in Norway
- Lighthouses in Norway
