= Bird cliff =

Steep cliffs with nesting locations for bird colonies

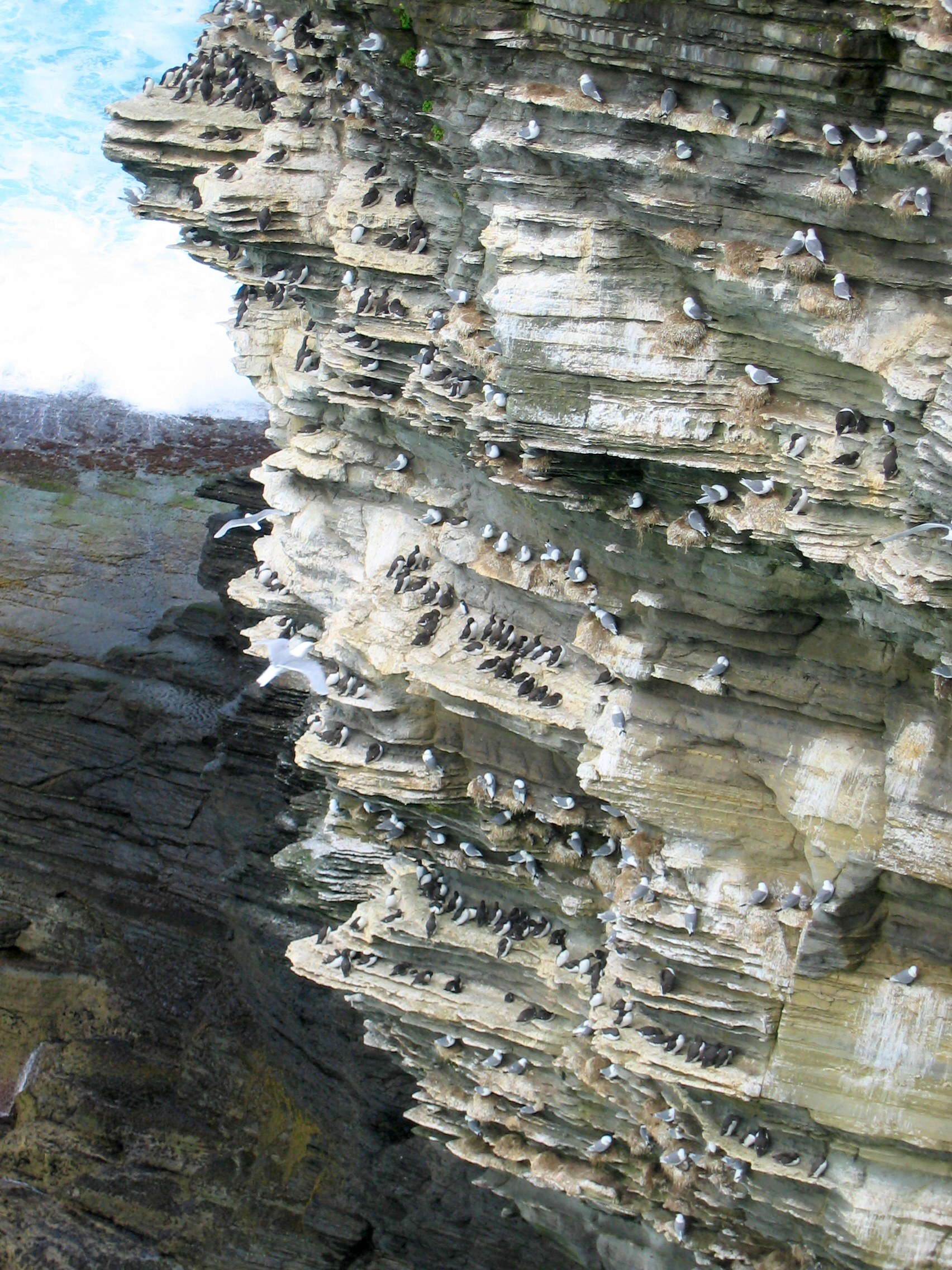
Bird cliff in the Orkney Islands

A bird cliff, or nesting cliff, is a steep cliff with numerous small shelves which serve as nesting locations for bird colonies. Bird cliffs are found on islands in the North Atlantic and Arctic, such as the Faroe Islands, Iceland, the Svalbard archipelago and on islands off Northern Norway. Birds that nest in large numbers on bird cliffs include auks, kittiwakes, barnacle geese, and typical Old World vultures. The number of breeding couples may exhibit large variations depending on available food. Bird cliffs have often been exploited as a food resource by the local population, as well as being used by hunters and egg collectors.

== Gallery ==
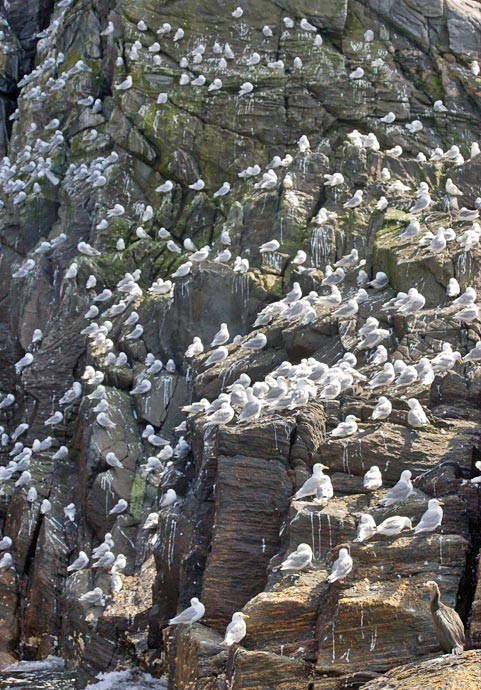
Kittiwakes on a bird cliff at the island of Runde

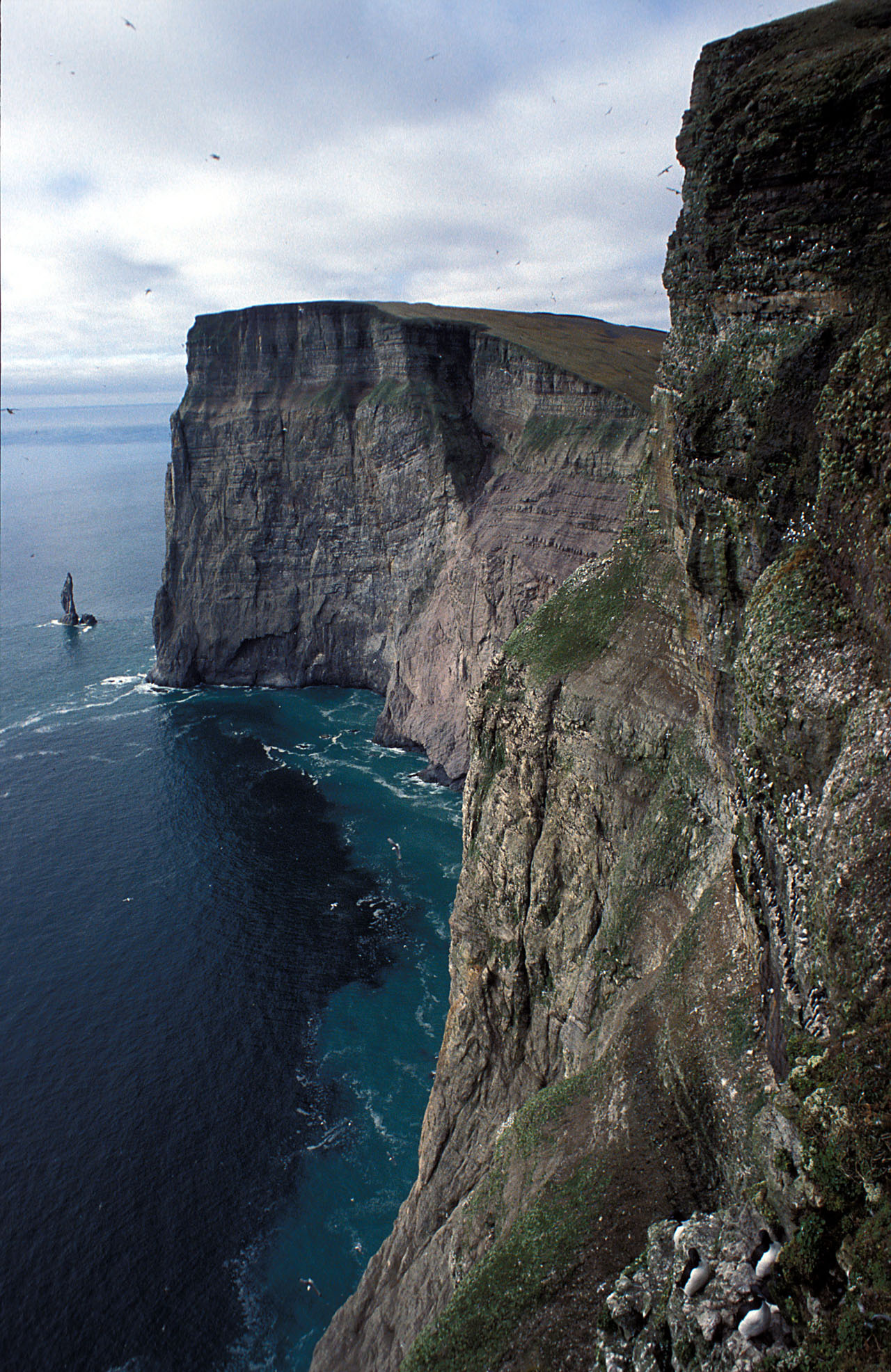
Colony of thick-billed murre at bird cliff of Stappen, Bear Island

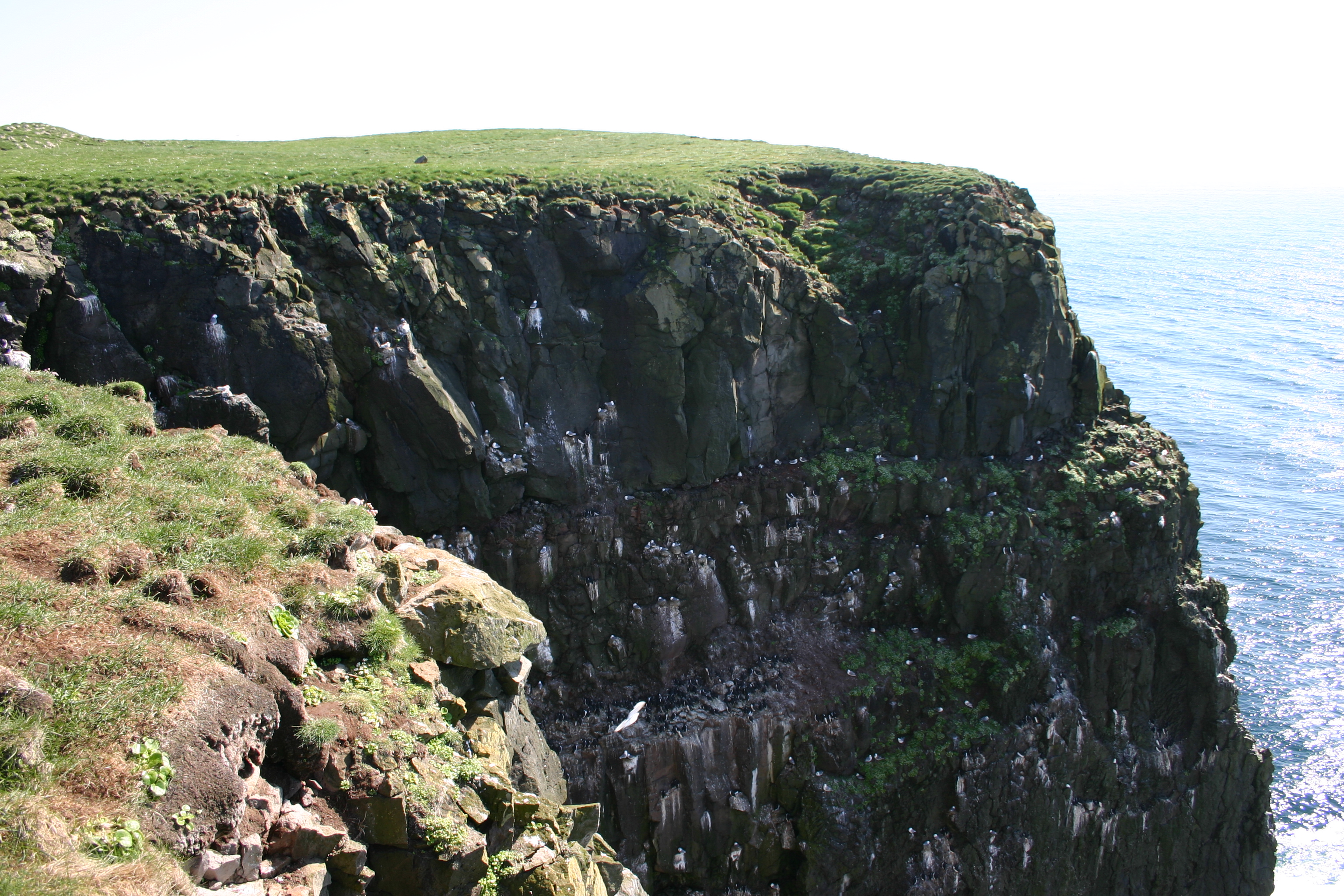
Látrabjarg bird cliff, Iceland

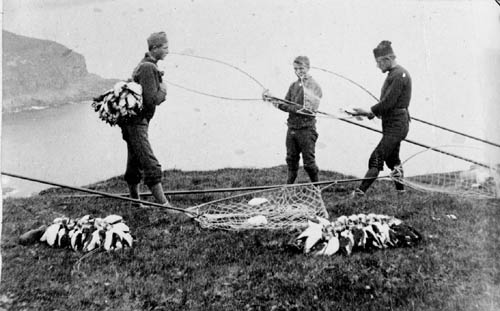
Bird hunters at the Faroe Islands

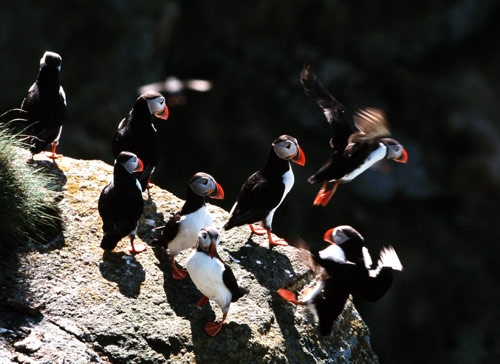
Atlantic puffin at Røst
