= Runde =

Island in Møre og Romsdal, Norway

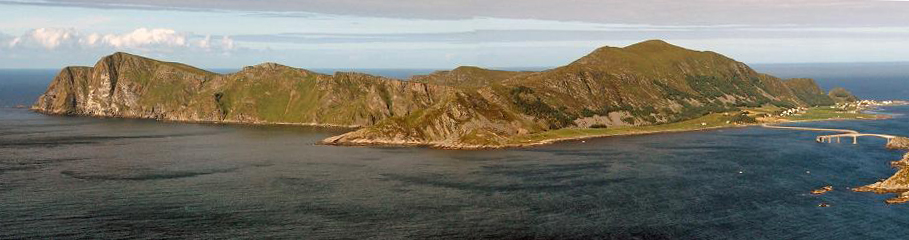
- Interactive map of Runde

Geography
- Location: Møre og Romsdal, Norway
- Coordinates: 62.4006°N 5.6241°E
- Area: 6.2 km^{2} (2.4 sq mi)
- Length: 4 km (2.5 mi)
- Width: 3.5 km (2.17 mi)
- Highest elevation: 332 m (1089 ft)
- Highest point: Varden

Administration
- Norway
- County: Møre og Romsdal
- Municipality: Herøy Municipality

Demographics
- Population: 113 (2015)

Ramsar Wetland
- Designated: 27 May 2013
- Reference no.: 2164

Runde is an island in Herøy Municipality in Møre og Romsdal county, Norway. The island has a population of 113 people (as of 2015), and it is connected by the Runde Bridge to the island of Remøya to the south.

Runde is famous for its enormous number of birds. It is said that there are about 500,000 to 700,000 seabirds inhabiting the island, most of them are to be found in the cliffs. The Runde Environmental Centre (Norwegian: Runde Miljøsenter) is a research station at the bird island.

Runde lies on the west coast of Norway, close to towns and villages like Fosnavåg, Ulsteinvik, Volda, Ørsta, and Ålesund. This region of Norway is famous for its long fjords and steep, snow-clad mountains.

== Birdlife ==
The island has been designated an Important Bird Area (IBA) by BirdLife International. The birdlife on Runde is protected by the Goksøyr Mires Nature Reserve, part of the Runde Ramsar Site.

Name	Pairs
Atlantic puffin	100,000
Black-legged kittiwake	50,000
Common guillemot	8,000
Fulmar	5,500
Razorbill	3,000
Northern gannet	2,500
Common shag	1,500
Great skua	50
White-tailed eagle	20

== History ==
Throughout the years, several ships have sunk near Runde on the Norwegian coast. Some of them are said to be ships from the Netherlands and Spain, loaded with gold and silver.

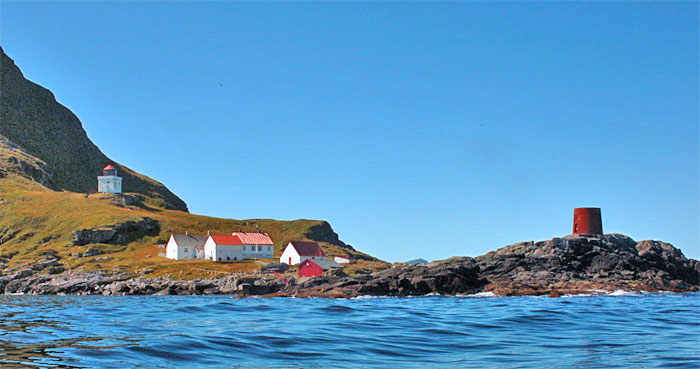
The lighthouse of Runde

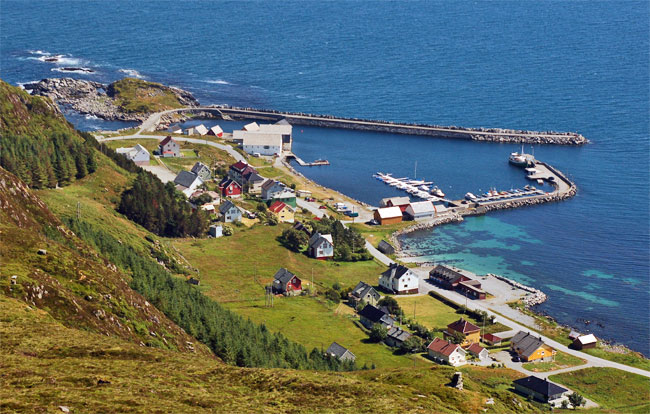
Runde Harbor

=== Akerendam Shipwreck ===
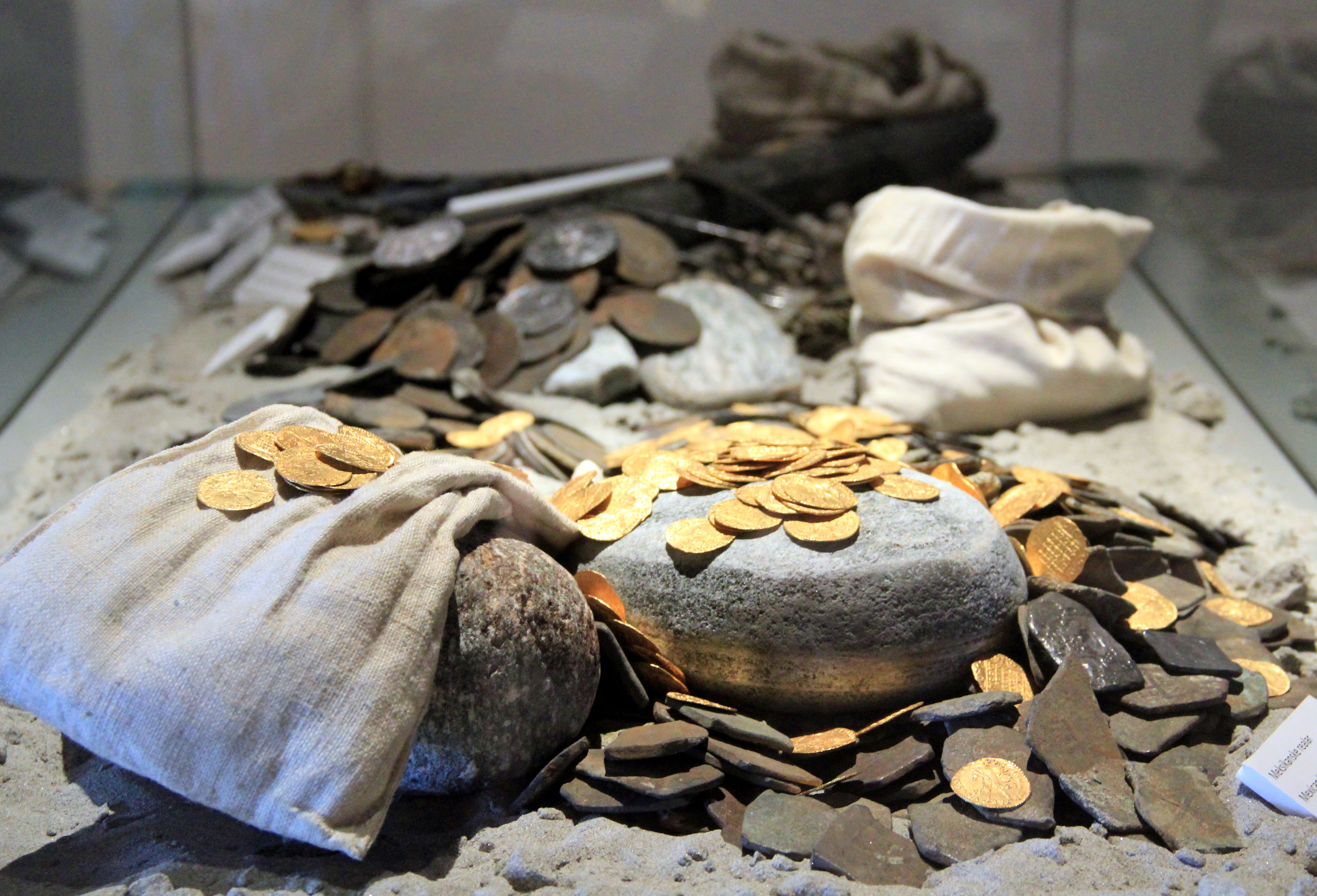
Part of the Runde treasure

One ship from the Netherlands, the Akerendam, was a newly built vessel which set sail from an island called Texel in Netherlands on 19 January 1725. Akerendam was a part of the Dutch merchant fleet, headed for Batavia (Indonesia) loaded with gold and silver coins to be used for the trade of spices in the Far East. The ship got caught in a storm in the North Sea, and the Akerendam disappeared into the north. The ship went down on the north side of Runde, and the whole crew of 200 was lost at sea. The inhabitants of Runde started to find parts of the ship that was washed up at its shore, including dead crew members.

The wreck site was close to the shore, and during the summer of 1725 four chests and other parts of the cargo were salvaged. But then the divers gave up, and the wreck was forgotten. During the 19th century, locals often found coins at the shore. But the origin was already forgotten, and the findings created the story that the coins was from the Spanish Armada of the 16th century.

The wreck was rediscovered in 1972 by sport scuba divers Bengt-Olof Gustafsson (Sweden), Stefan Persson (Sweden), and Eystein Krohn-Dale (Norway). Under the bottom vegetation of the seabed, the sand bottom was littered with encrusted coins. The following year, the site was investigated by Bergen Sjøfartsmuseum. Little remained of the ship but more than 500 kilograms (1,100 lb) of gold and silver was salvaged. In total about 57,000 coins were found; 6,600 of them being gold coins—mostly the rare 1724 Dutch Gold Ducat minted in Utrecht with only a handful known prior to this find, and the rest silver coins. Parts of the treasure are kept at Bergen Sjøfartsmuseum in Bergen and also at the Norwegian Coin Museum in Oslo.

The finders were allowed to keep two thirds of the treasure, which was later sold to collectors worldwide. The 1724 Utrecht Gold Ducats can command $750 to $1,000 each and are all in uncirculated quality, the highest graded ones are NGC / PCGS MS-63. The Norwegian state received 25% and the Netherlands received 7% of the treasure. This event later initiated a new legislation, making all wrecks older than 100 years automatically protected in Norway.

== Runde Environmental Centre ==
The Runde Environmental Centre is a research station on Runde which has 4 main activities: a marine station, a house and hub for small spin-off businesses, an information centre, and a conference/overnight centre with 34 hotel-standard rooms in 8 apartment suites. In 2008, the Runde Tourist office at Runde Environmental Centre was founded.

== See also ==
- List of islands of Norway
