= Bird reserve =

Naturally occurring sanctuary designed to protect bird species

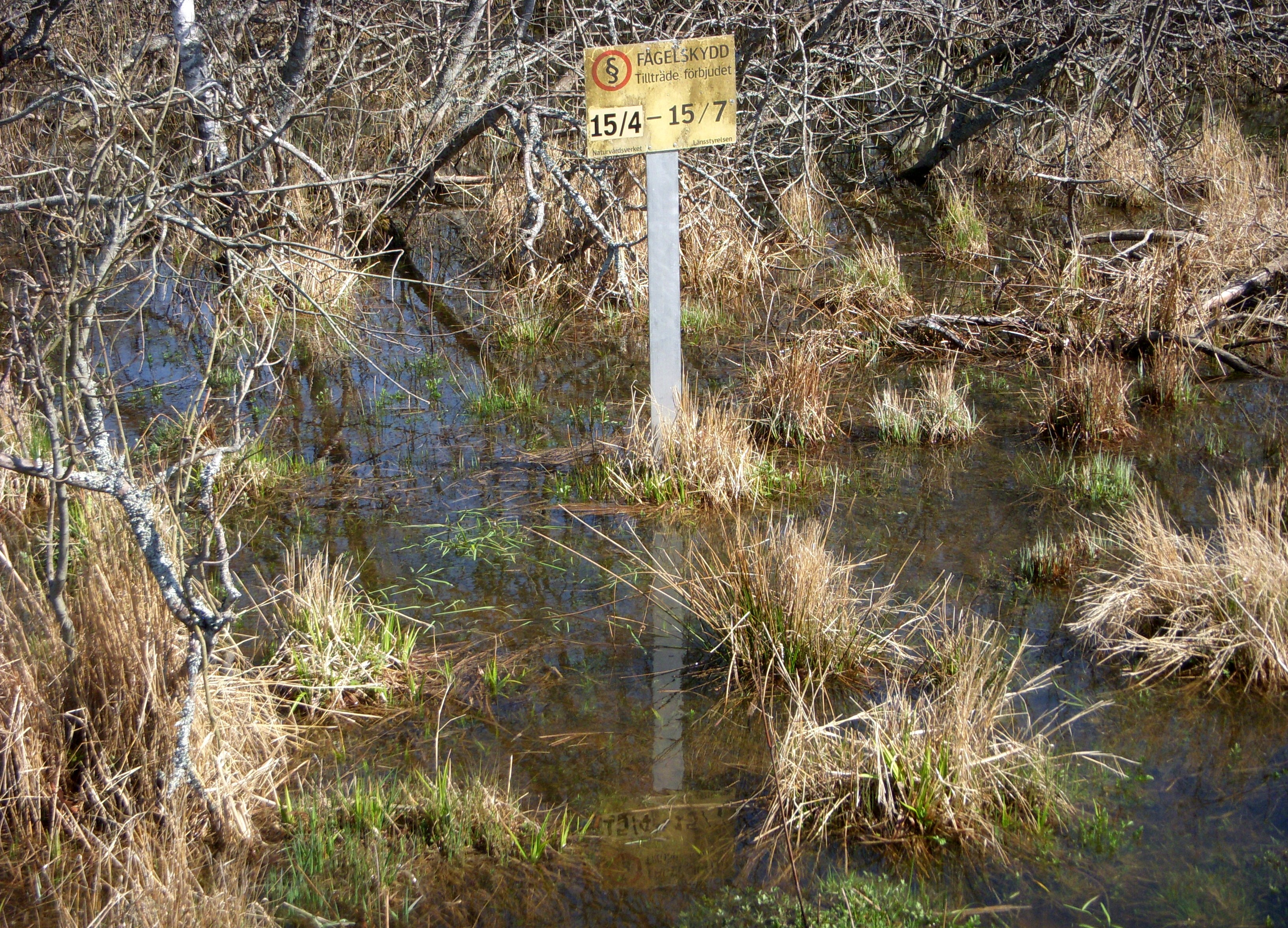
Sign marking the borders of the bird reserve at Ågestasjön, Sweden

A bird reserve (also called ornithological reserve) is a wildlife refuge designed to protect bird species. Like other wildlife refuges, the main goal of a reserve is to prevent species from becoming endangered or extinct. Typically, bird species in a reserve are protected from hunting and habitat destruction. Because of the protection they provide from such threats, bird reserves also serve as excellent locations for bird watching. Normally, wildlife refuges are under the care of non-profit organizations and governmental institutions.

== Protected area ==
A bird reserve is an area where steps have been taken to preserve a habitation that is vital to birds. It can be areas such as wetlands, that normally attract many birds, or land that is important to the survival of an endangered species. Globally, there are different kinds of protected areas with varying legal status. Examples of such are international protection programs, programs governed by the European Union, national and regional programs.

== Protection programs ==
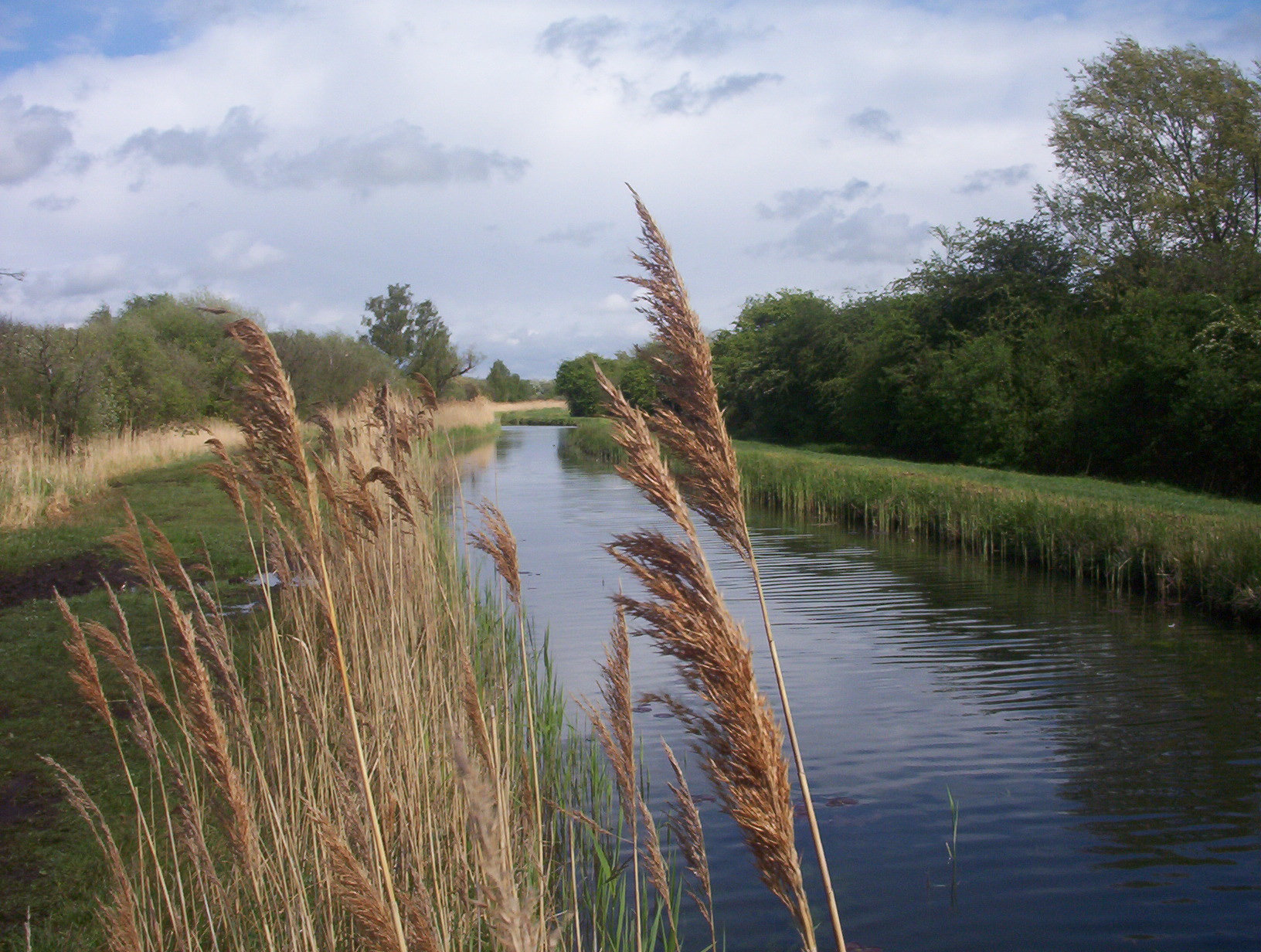
The nature reserve Wicken Fen, close to Soham, England, is a SPA area

=== IBA ===
IBA (Important Bird Area) is an international protection program initiated by BirdLife International. An IBA area is a habitat that is vital for protecting birds from a global perspective. In 2012, there were over 10,000 IBA areas around the world. The areas are identified by BirdLife International and have to be small enough so that the entire habitat can be preserved. The area must also be of a different character, easily distinguished, than the surrounding habitats.

The IBA areas are often part of already existing protected areas and are therefore under protection of national law. Legal status and protection for areas that are not part of national protected area, vary depending on the country.

=== SPA ===
The European Union's Birds Directive requires that special protected areas for birds, so called SPA (Special Protection Areas).

=== Ramsar ===
The Ramsar Convention (The Convention on Wetlands of International Importance, especially as Waterfowl Habitat) is an international agreement to protect wetlands, with special focus on aquatic birds.

== Around the world ==
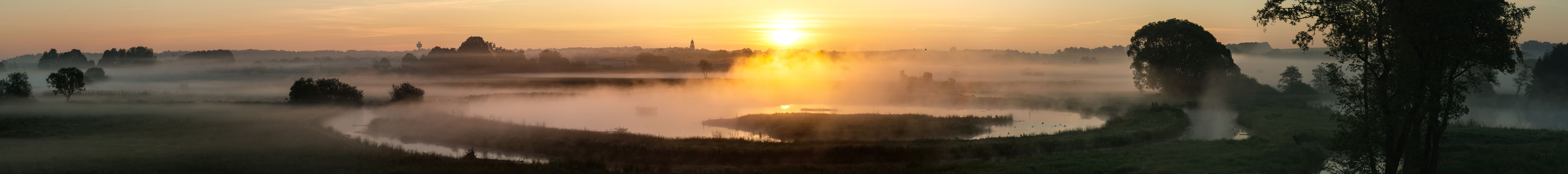
Panorama of a bird sanctuary Kozmice in the Czech Republic

=== Sweden ===
In Sweden it is the County administrative boards of Sweden and the Environmental Protection Agency that selects which areas are to be designated as bird reserves. Among the noted areas are Tåkern, Lake Hornborga, the southern part of Öland and Getterön. There are approximately 50 Ramsar areas in Sweden, and around 530 SPA areas where the latter comprises almost 30,000 km^{2} (12,000 mi^{2}).
