= Georg Eliassen =

Norwegian architect (1880–1964)

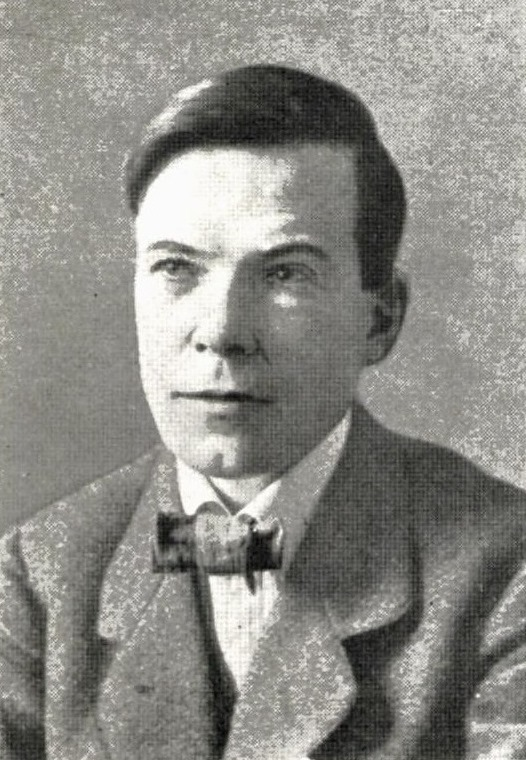
- Born: 1 July 1880
- Died: 24 December 1964 (aged 84)
- Occupation: architect
- Children: Trond Eliassen; Arnt Eliassen
- Relatives: Torolv Solheim (son-in-law); Anton Eliassen (grandson)
- Awards: Order of St. Olav

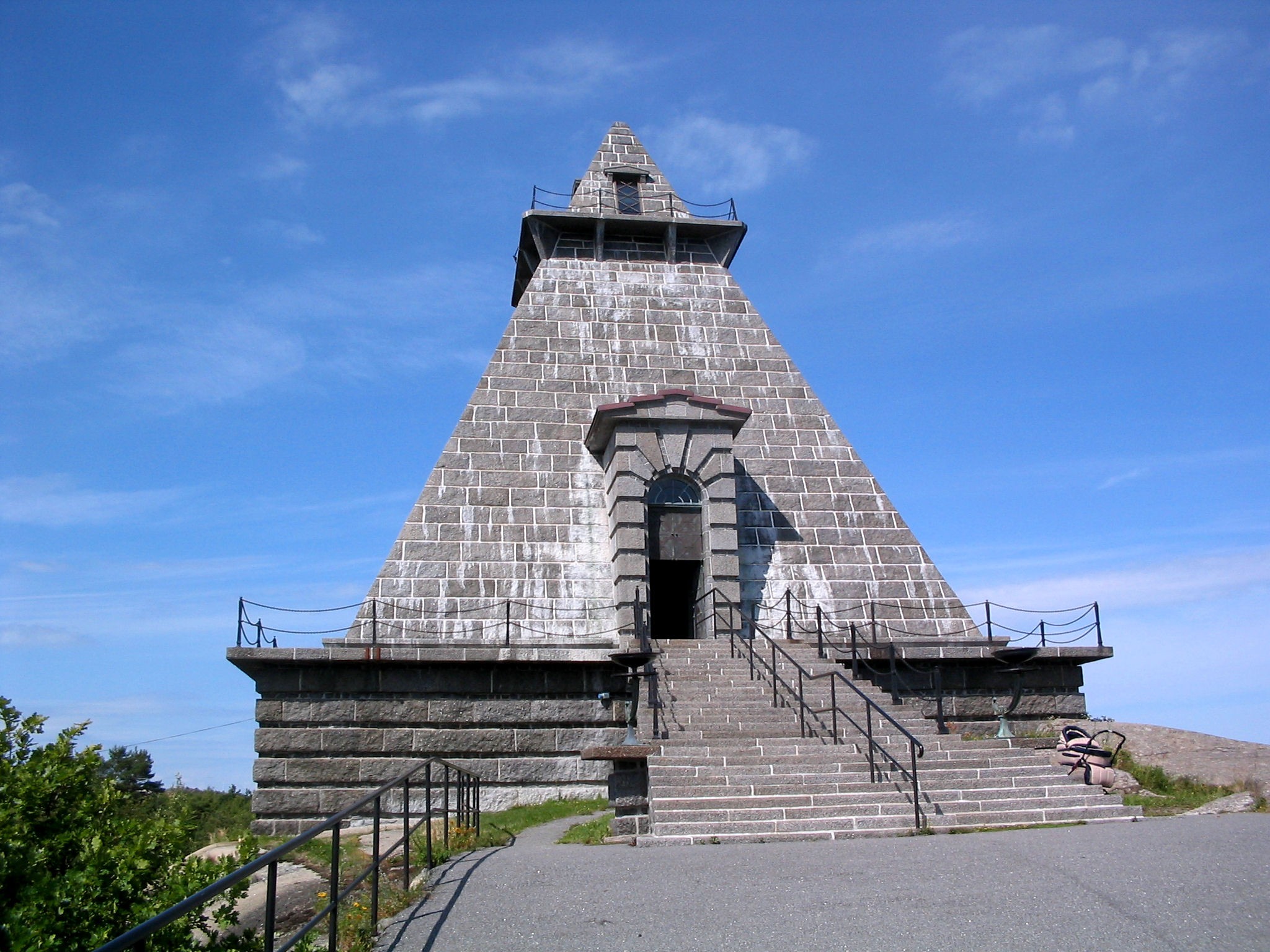
Minnehallen in Stavern

Georg Eliassen (1 July 1880 – 24 December 1964) was a Norwegian architect.

== Personal life ==
Eliassen was born in Kristiania to Anton G. Eliassen and Ragna Gundersen. In 1907, he married Helfrid Beda Andrea Strömberg. They were the parents of Trond Eliassen and Arnt Eliassen. Their daughter, Rønnaug, married educator and politician Torolv Solheim.

== Career ==
Eliassen was educated at the Kristiania tekniske skole and the KTH Royal Institute of Technology in Stockholm. He established an architecture firm with Andreas Bjercke in 1914, and they were among the most prolific architects in Norway until the 1950s. He was decorated as a Knight, First Class of the Order of St. Olav in 1951. He died in Oslo in 1964.
