= Svenner =

Island group in Vestfold, Norway

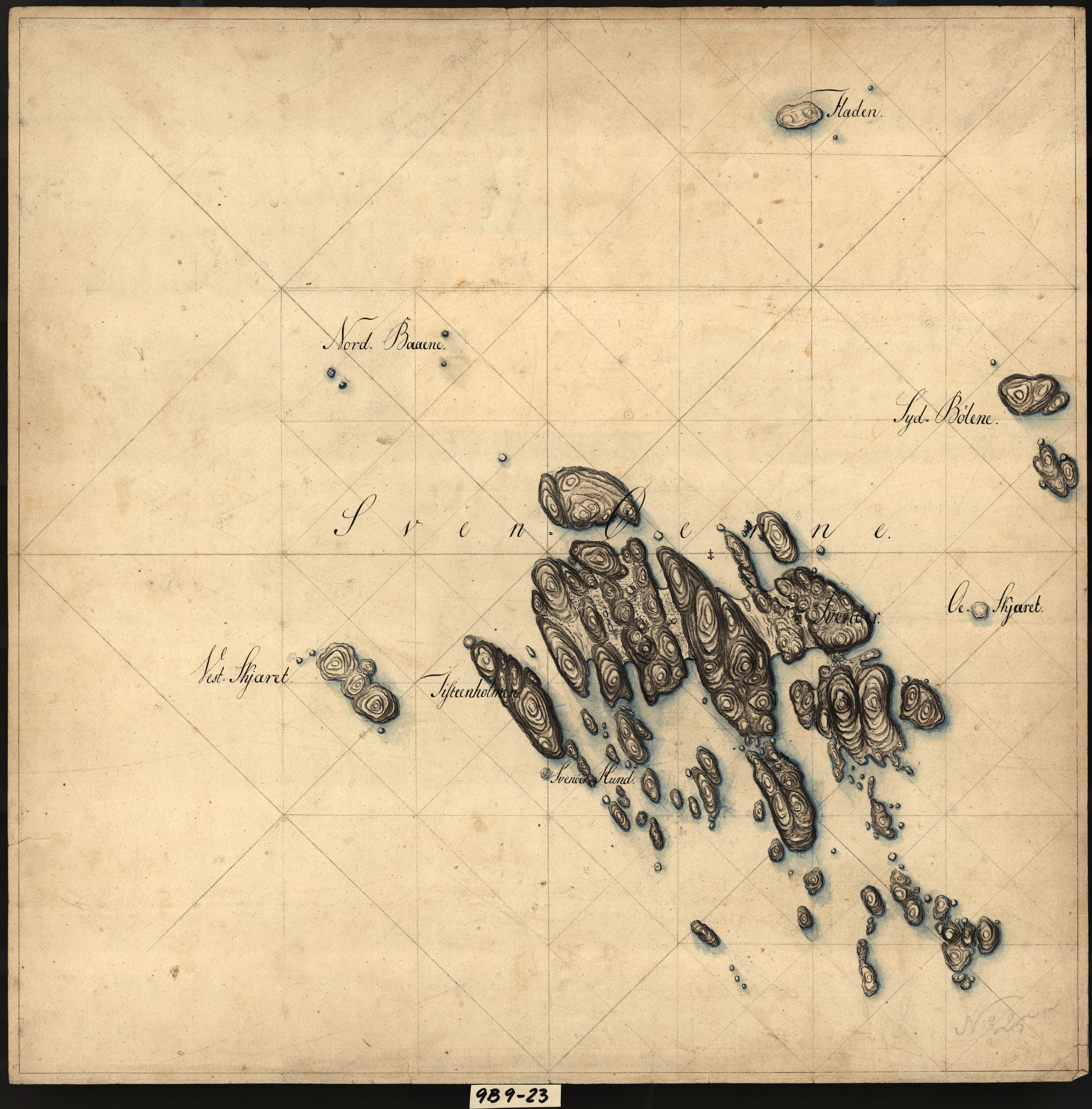
- Map of the islands
- Interactive map of the island

Geography
- Location: Vestfold, Norway
- Coordinates: 58.97235°N 10.14329°E

Administration
- Norway
- County: Vestfold
- Municipality: Larvik Municipality

Svenner is a small island group in Larvik Municipality in Vestfold county, Norway. The islands lie about 3.5 kilometres (2.2 mi) off the mainland coast, near the mouth of the Larviksfjorden. They are located about 7 kilometres (4.3 mi) southeast of the town of Stavern.

The Svenner Lighthouse was established in 1874 on the island of Korpekollen. The smaller islands of Bølene, Strømsundholmen, and Ferjeholmen were listed as bird sanctuaries in 2009.

Geologically, the islands consist largely of syenite. The WWII destroyer HNoMS Svenner is named after the main island.

== Media gallery ==
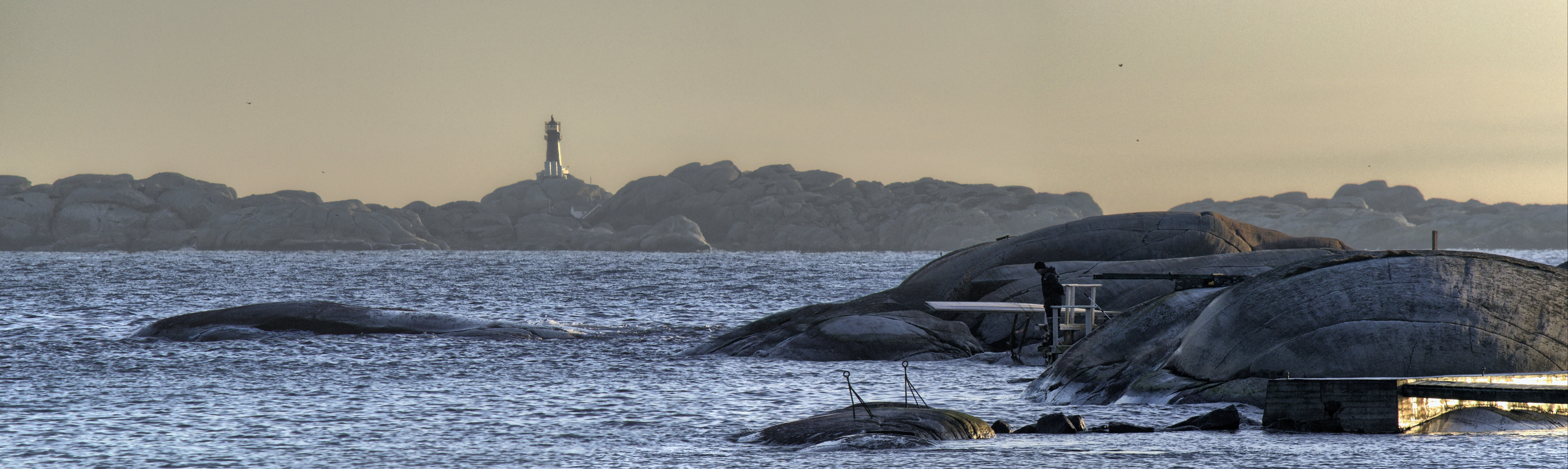

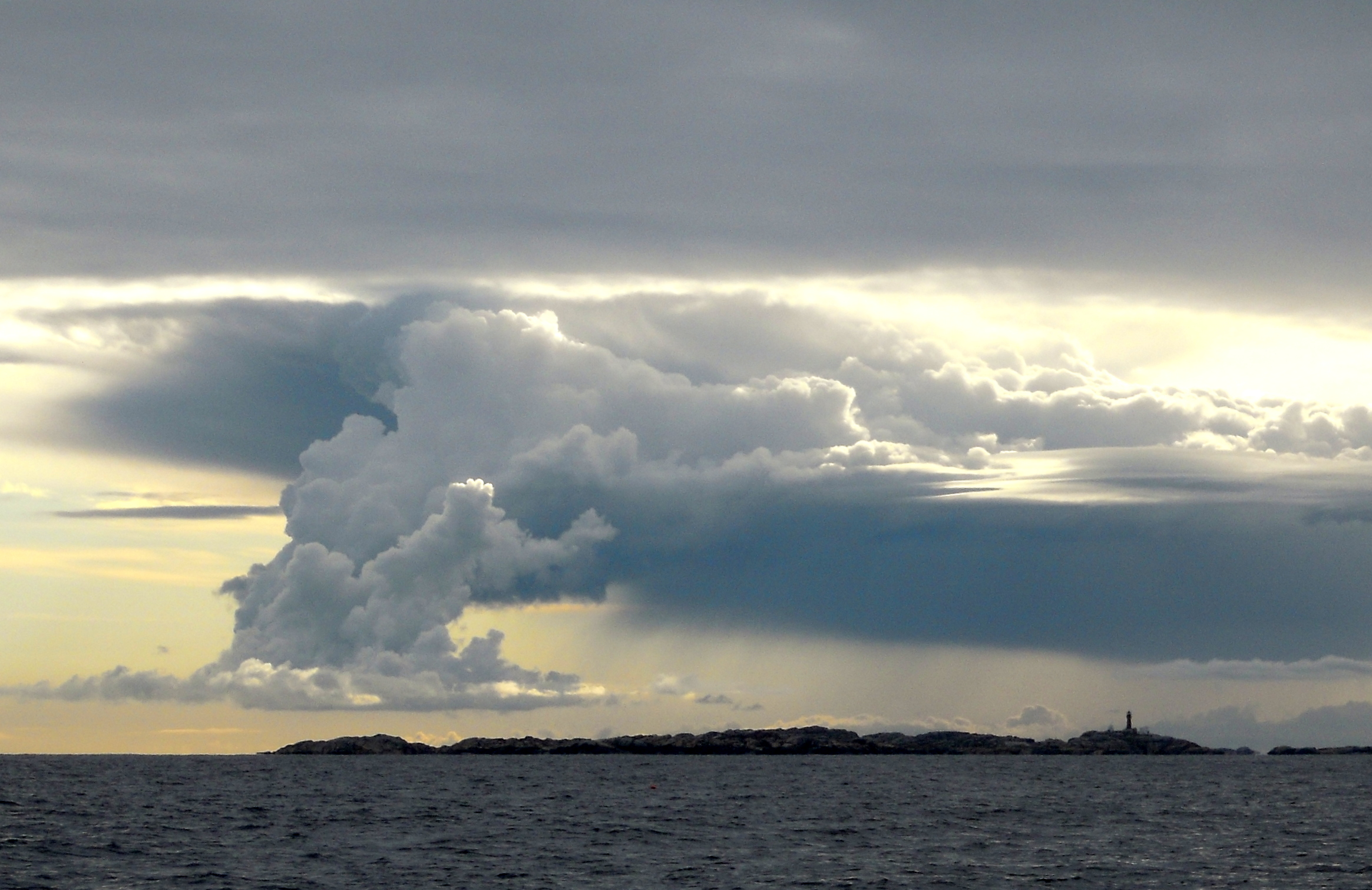

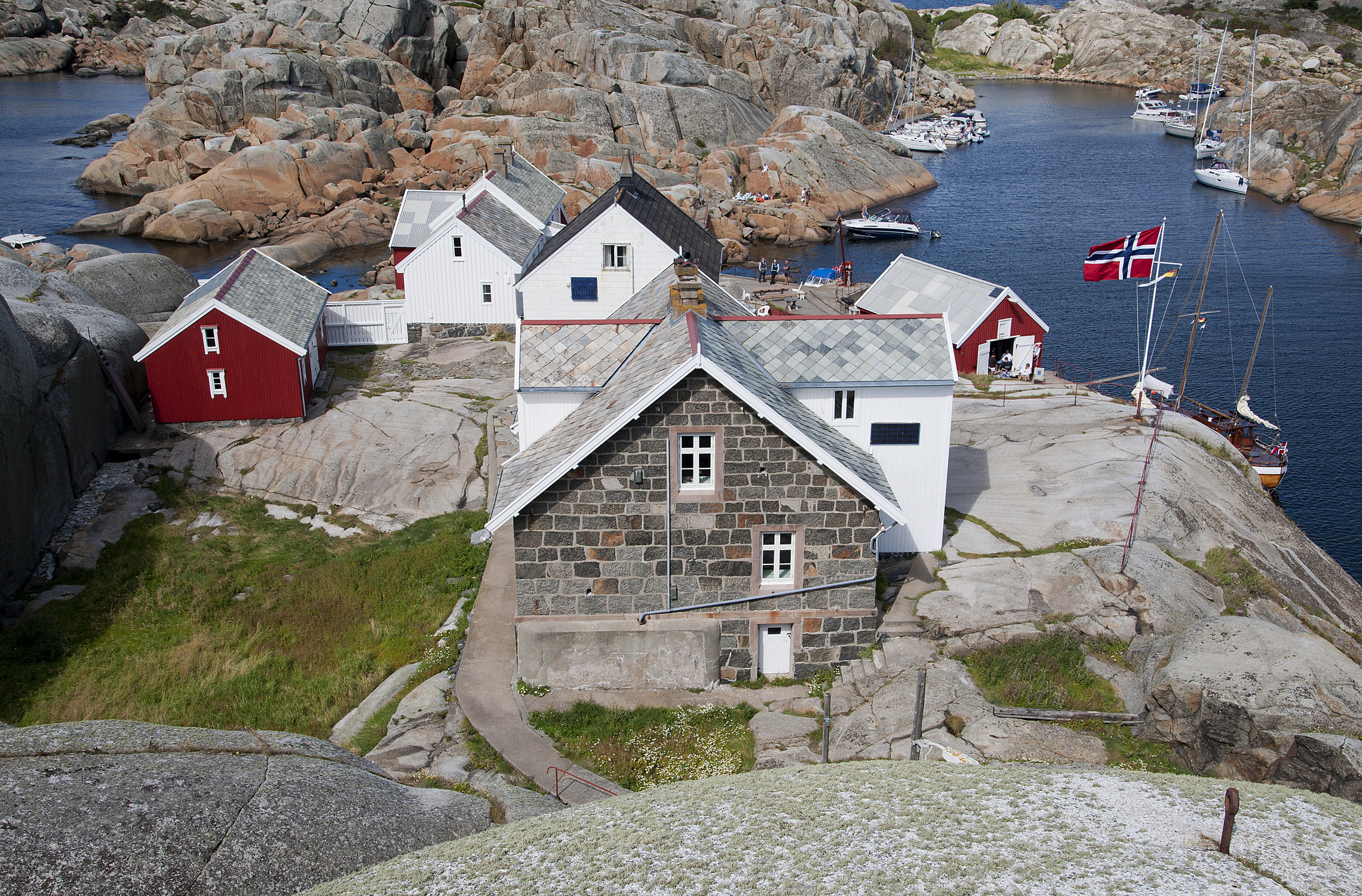

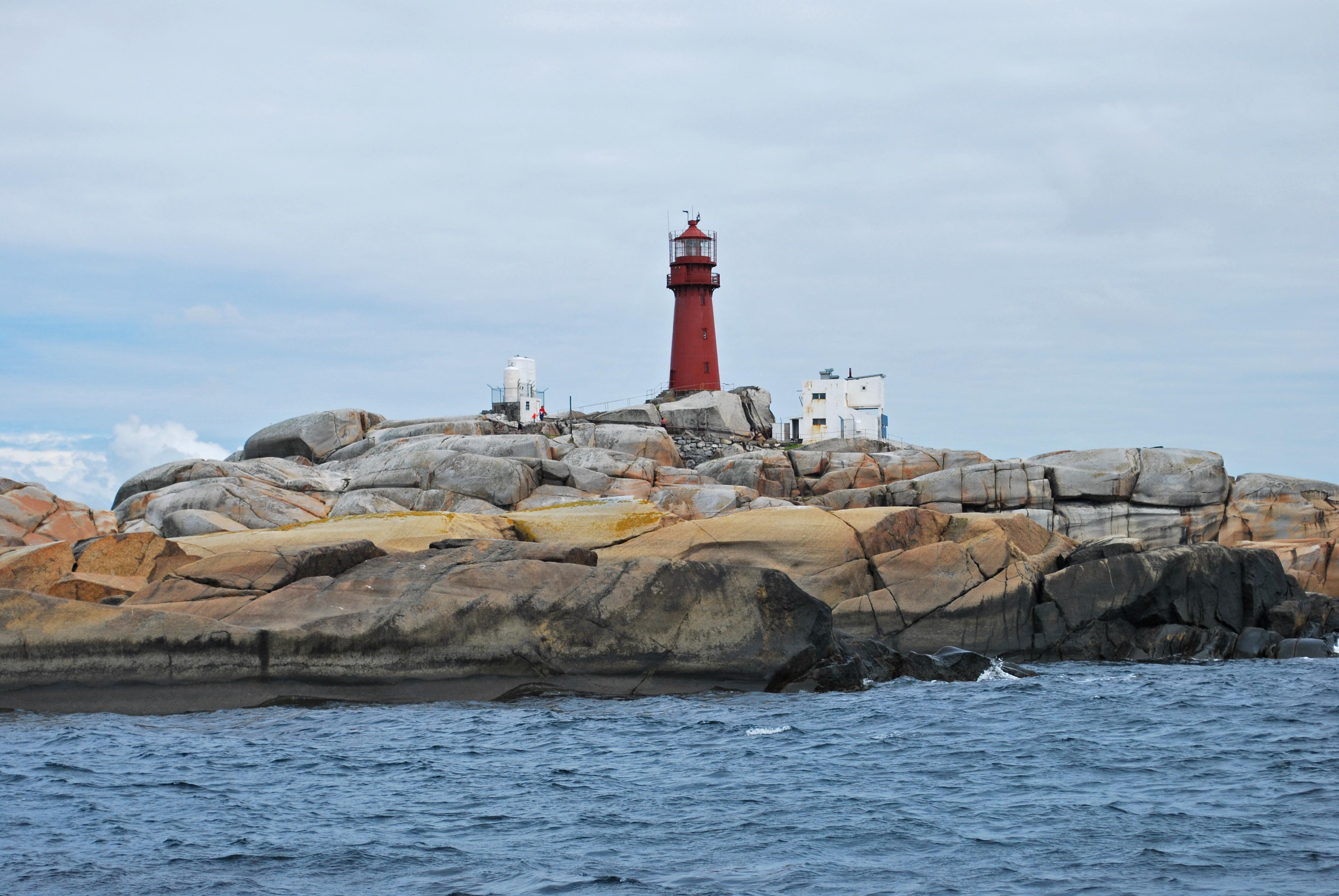

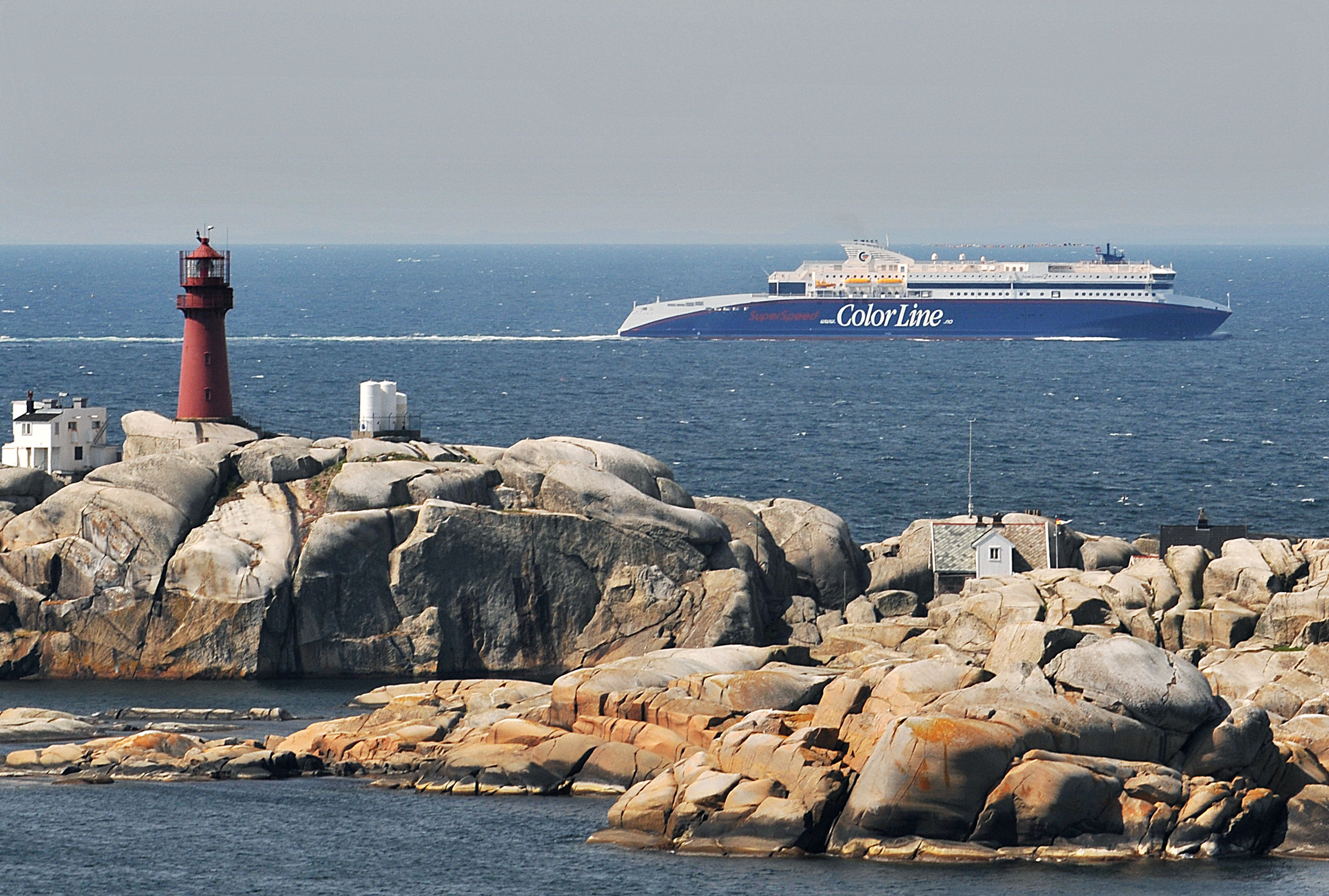

== See also ==
- List of islands of Norway
