= Stavernsodden Lighthouse =

Coastal lighthouse in Norway

Stavernsodden Lighthouse Stavernsodden fyr
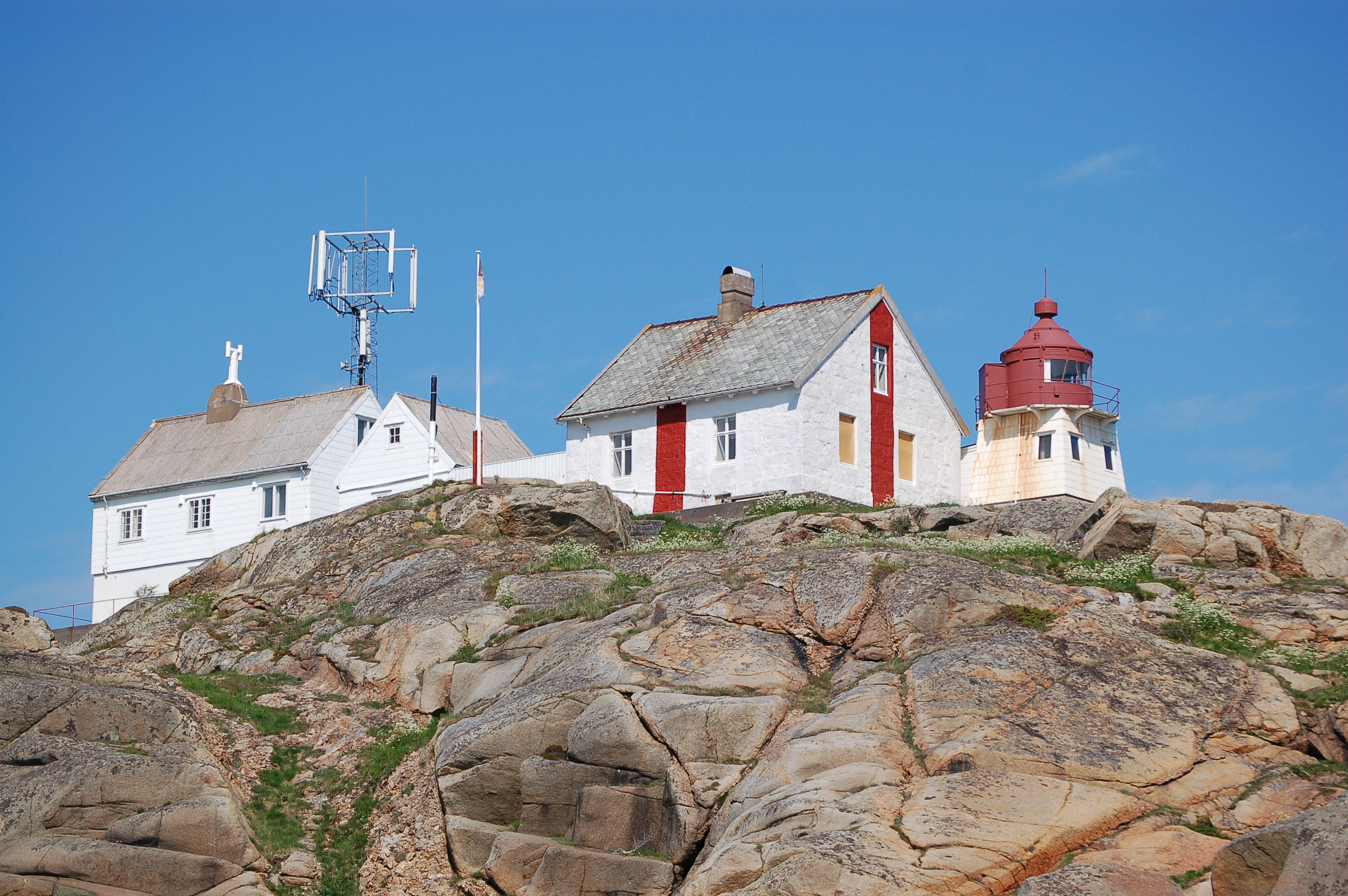
- Location: Stavernsøya, Larvik, Norway
- Coordinates: 58°59′N 10°03′E

Tower
- Constructed: 1855
- Construction: masonry
- Automated: 1984
- Height: 7 m (23 ft)
- Shape: square
- Markings: white (tower), red (lantern)
- Operator: Norwegian historical lighthouse association
- Heritage: cultural property

Light
- First lit: 1874
- Focal height: 43.9 m (144 ft)
- Intensity: 13,400 candela
- Range: 14.9 nmi (27.6 km; 17.1 mi)
- Characteristic: Oc(3) WRG 10s

Stavernsodden Lighthouse (Norwegian: Stavernsodden fyr) is a coastal lighthouse in Larvik Municipality in Vestfold county, Norway. The lighthouse sits on a small island just off the coast of the town of Stavern, at the entrance to the Larviksfjorden. It was first lit in 1855, and was automated in 1984. The lighthouse was listed as a protected site in 1997.

== See also ==
- Lighthouses in Norway
- List of lighthouses in Norway
