= Fredriksvern Church =

Church in Vestfold, Norway

- Fredriksvern kirke
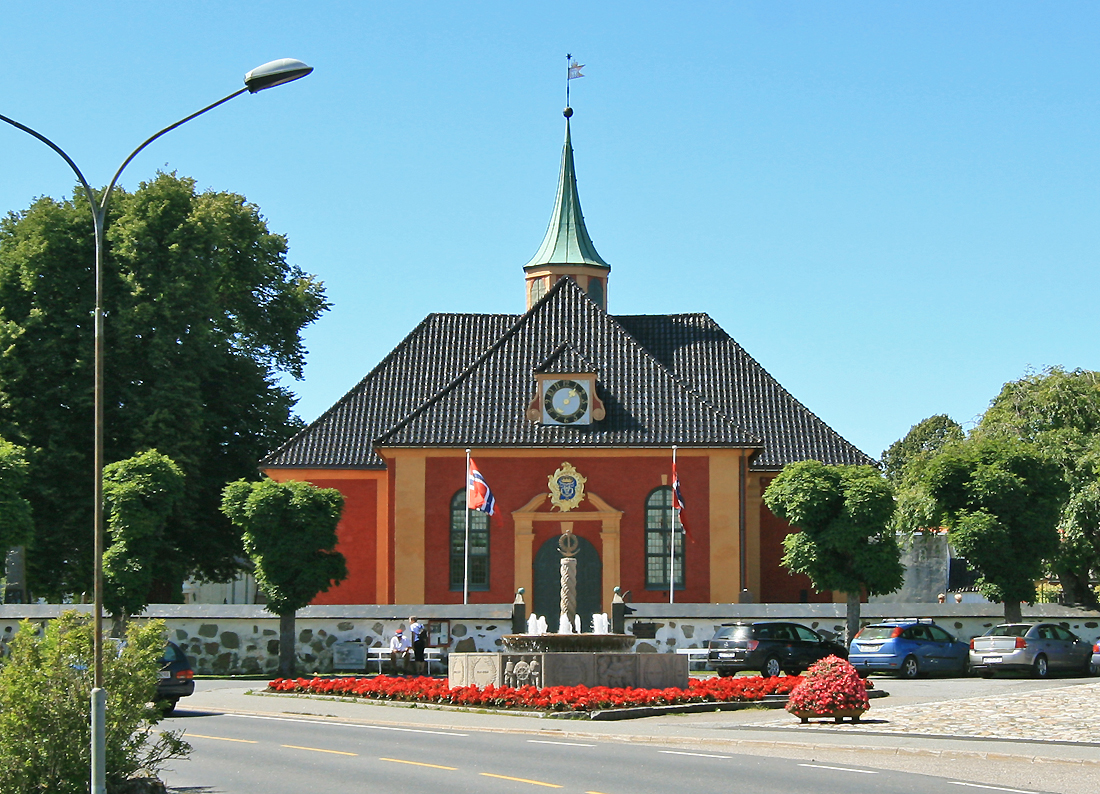
- View of the church
- Fredriksvern Church
- 58°59′51″N 10°02′04″E
- Location: Larvik Municipality, Vestfold
- Country: Norway
- Denomination: Church of Norway
- Churchmanship: Evangelical Lutheran

History
- Former name: Stavern kirke
- Status: Parish church
- Founded: 1756
- Consecrated: 31 March 1756

Architecture
- Functional status: Active
- Architect: Michael Johan Herbst
- Architectural type: Cruciform
- Style: Rococo
- Completed: 1756 (270 years ago)

Specifications
- Capacity: 350
- Materials: Brick

Administration
- Diocese: Tunsberg
- Deanery: Larvik prosti
- Parish: Stavern
- Norwegian Cultural Heritage Site
- Type: Church
- Status: Automatically protected
- ID: 85554

Fredriksvern Church (Norwegian: Fredriksvern kirke or historically Stavern Church) is a parish church of the Church of Norway in Larvik Municipality in Vestfold county, Norway. It is located in the town of Stavern. It is the church for the Stavern parish which is part of the Larvik prosti (deanery) in the Diocese of Tunsberg. The red brick church was built in a cruciform design in 1756 using plans drawn up by the architect Michael Johan Herbst. The church seats about 350 people.

== History ==
In 1748, it was decided to build a shipyard and fleet base of the Royal Navy of Denmark-Norway in what is now the town of Stavern. The construction of the shipyard and naval base began in 1750. Soon after, plans were made to build a church for the local naval garrison. The church was designed by Michael Johan Herbst, who was commandant of the new Fredriksvern naval base, and the church was built in 1753–1756. The new church was consecrated on 31 March 1756, the birthday of King Frederik V, after whom the facility is named.

The building has a cruciform design and it is built of plastered brick and it has a hipped roof. A sacristy was built in 1760. The church is said to be a masterpiece of Rococo design in Norway. Despite this, it has a couple of quirks that were supposedly necessary to secure funding. As part of the naval base, it was supposed to be able to serve as a multipurpose building with grain storage in the attic (hence the visible air ducts in the roof). It was also supposed to function as a temporary leprosarium when needed, thus the pews had fold-down backs to become make-shift beds when needed. On the outside, it has a clockwork that was installed one year after its consecration. There were originally several clocks, but there were problems with the drive mechanism, so only the clock above the main entrance has been preserved.

The church is located just outside the naval base fortifications and it is surrounded by the cemetery, which is divided into several fields. Until 1799, the cemetery was reserved for the military and followed a strict order of rank, while civilians were buried at the nearby Tanum Church cemetery. In 1986, the Torsrød cemetery was built about 1 kilometre (0.62 mi) to the west of the church, on the edge of town, to serve as the new cemetery for the church since the old cemetery was too small.

=== Name ===
For a long time, the name of the church has been somewhat uncertain and also somewhat controversial. The church was first known as Fredriksvern Church since that was the old name of the town as well as the name of the naval base, but later the town was renamed Stavern and so people began to refer to the church as Stavern Church. Similarly, the name of the parish was Fredriksvern sokn and then later known as Stavern sokn. On 2 December 2019, the diocesan council of the Diocese of Tunsberg formally voted to decide the issue once and for all: the parish is named Stavern sokn (Stavern parish) and the church is called Fredriksvern kirke (Fredriksvern Church).

== Media gallery ==
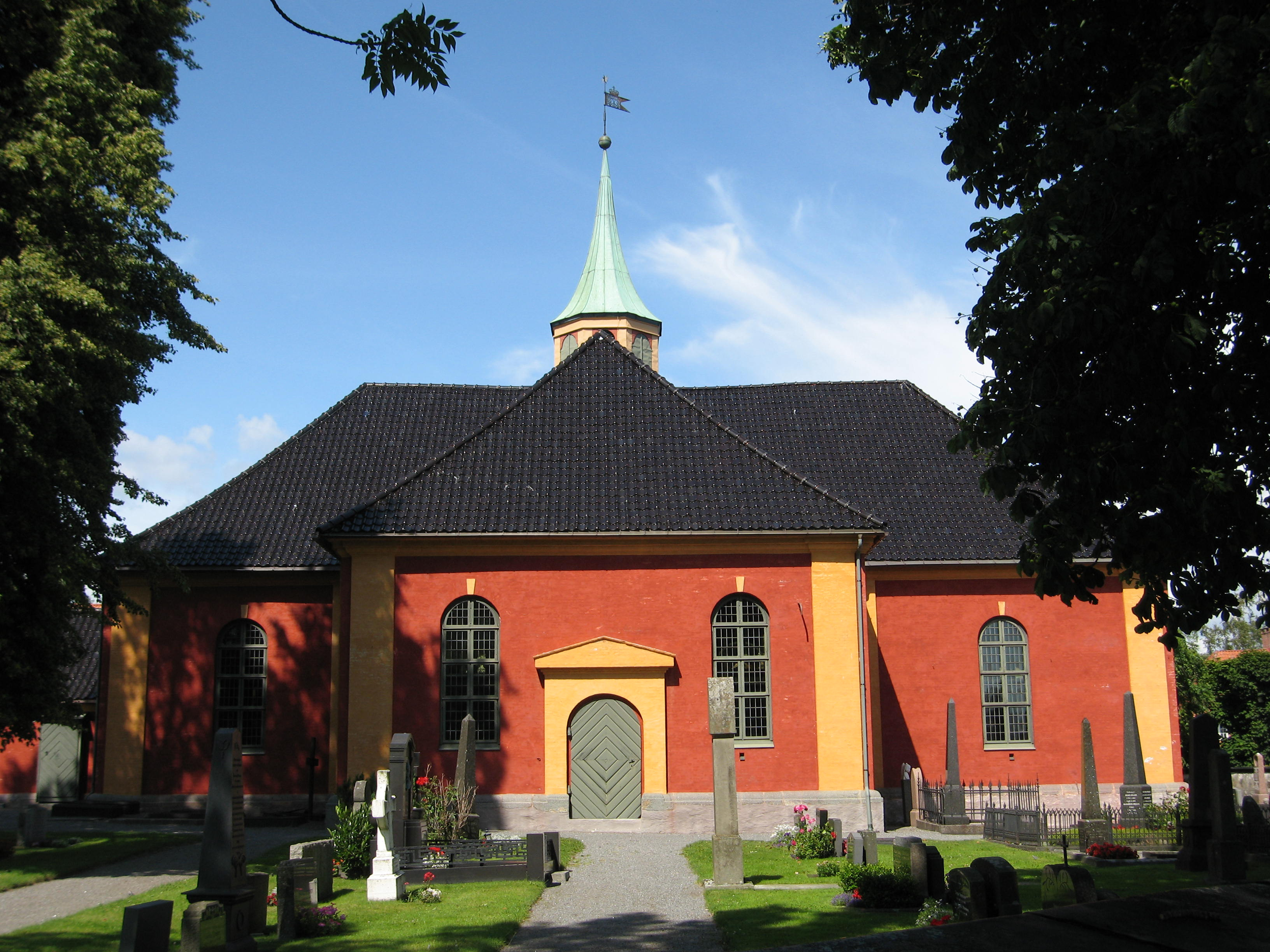

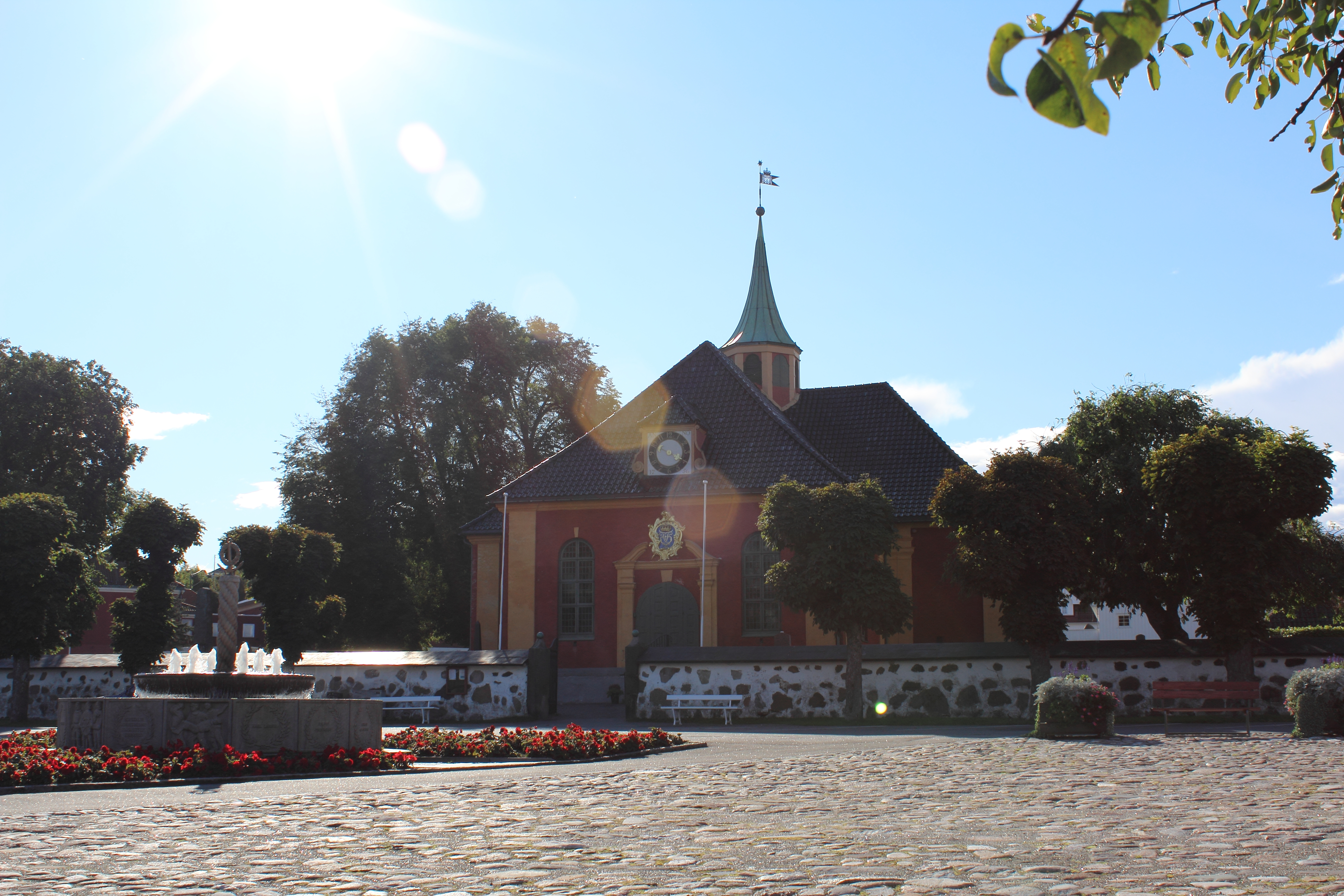

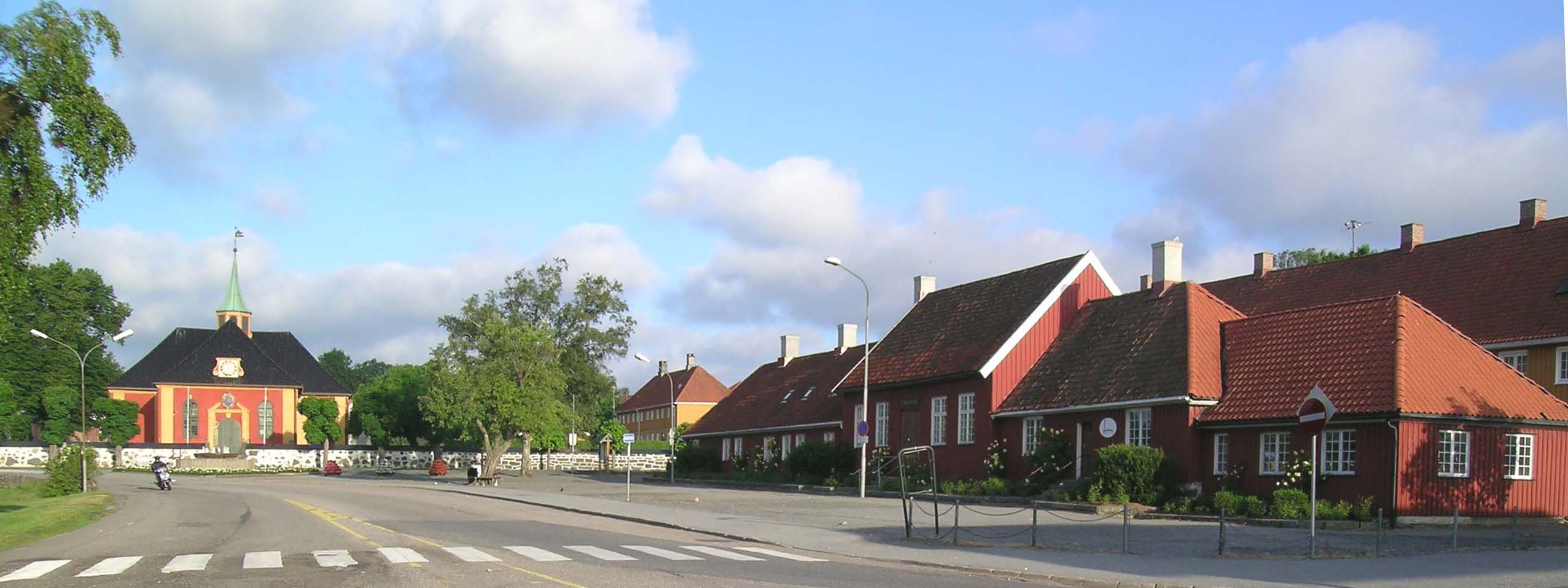

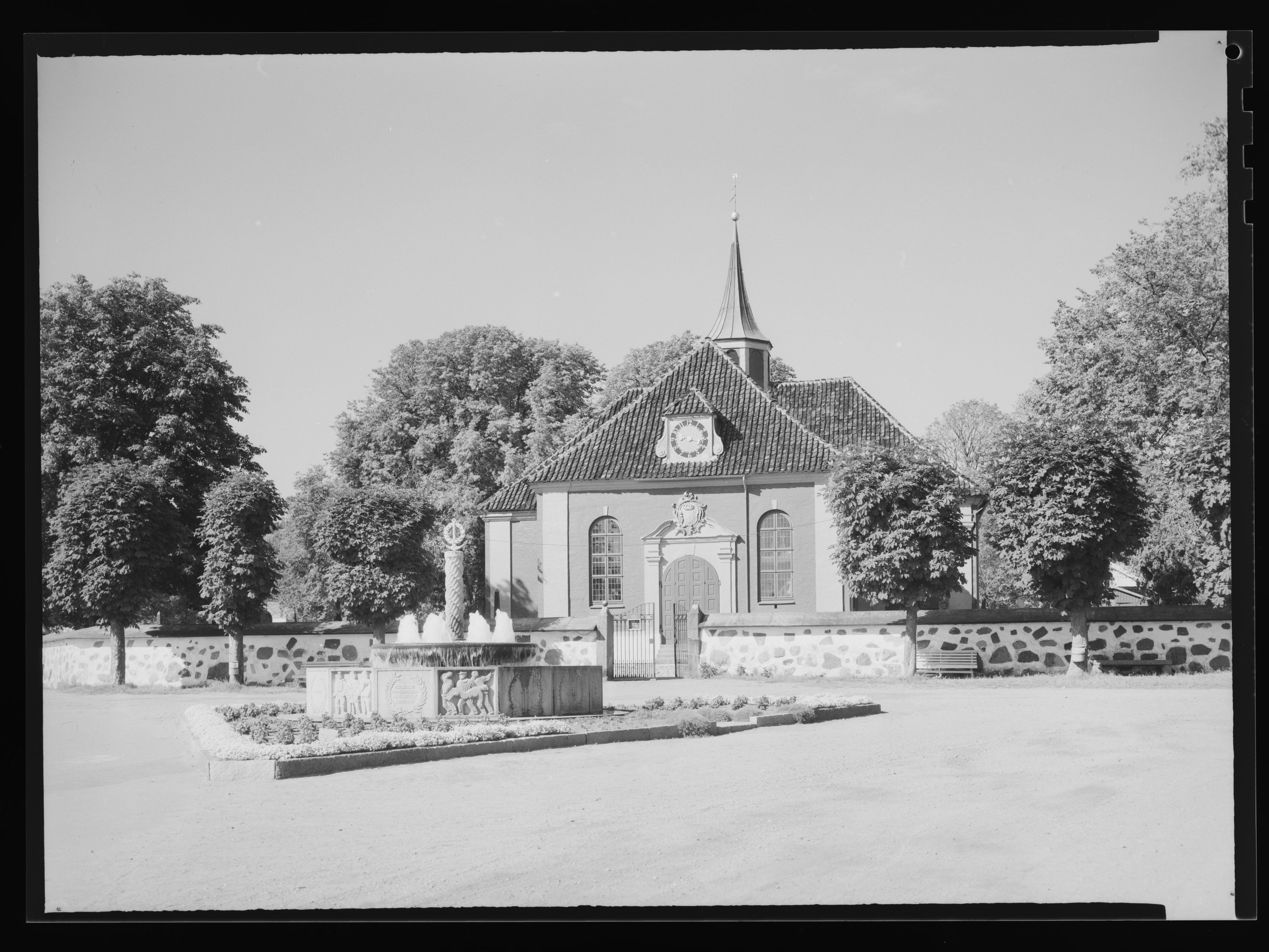

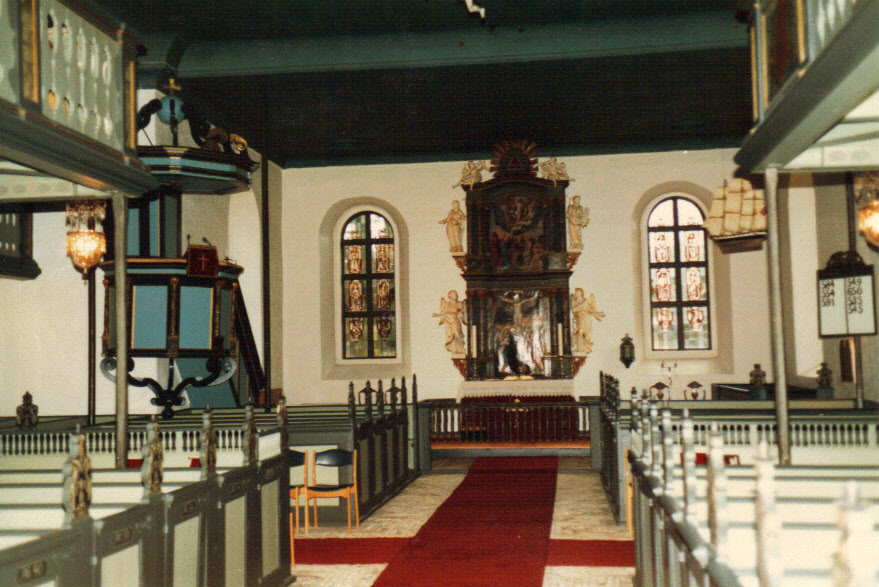

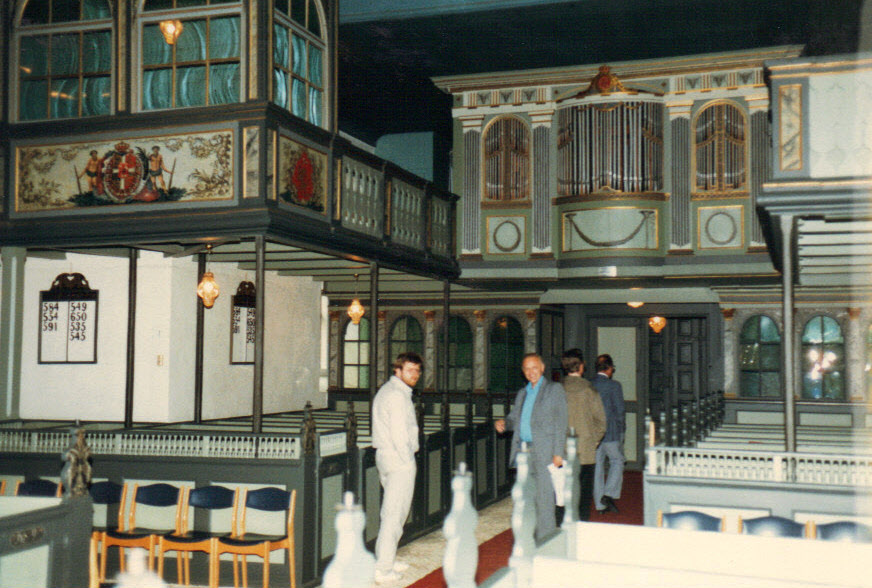

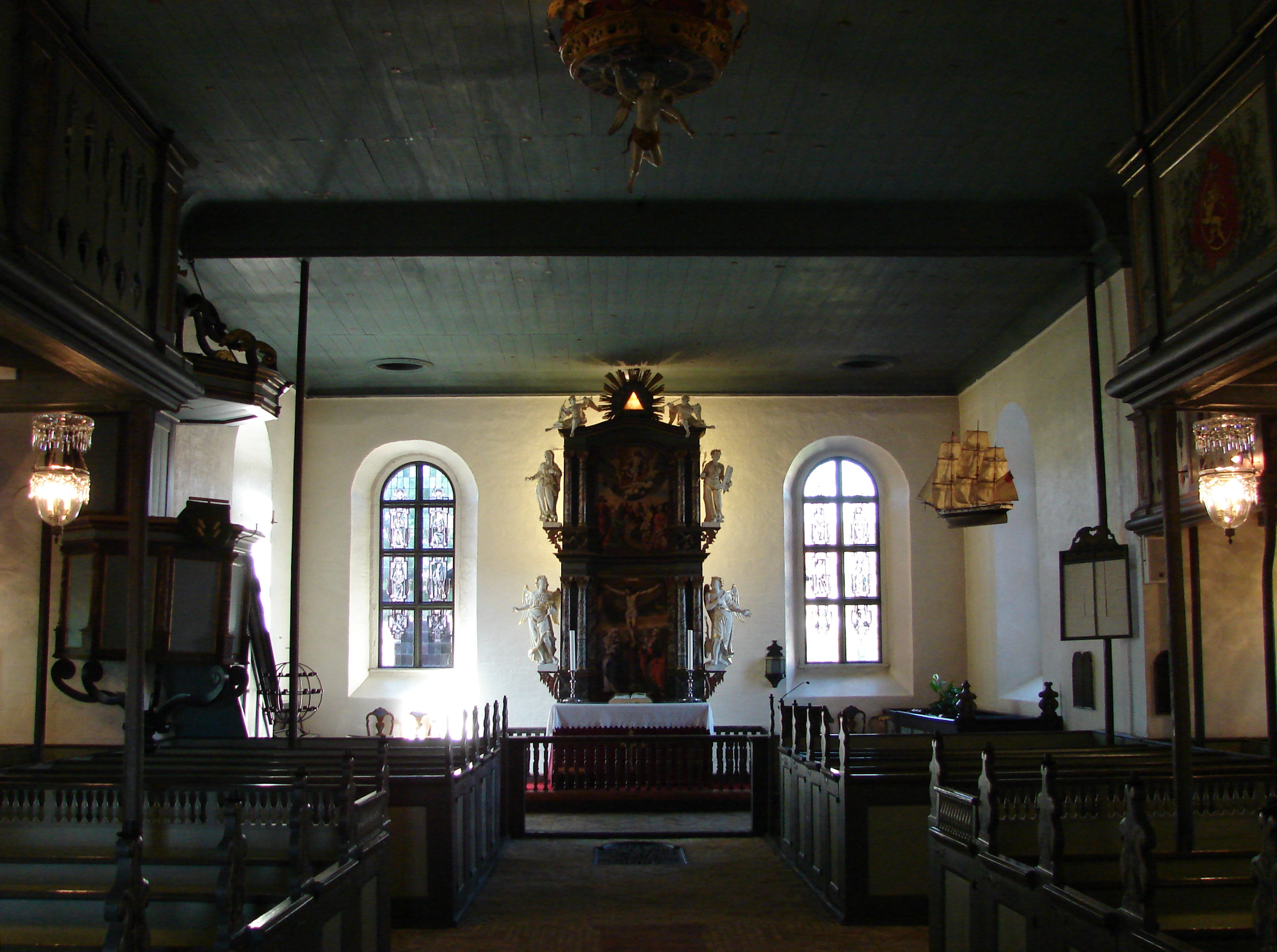

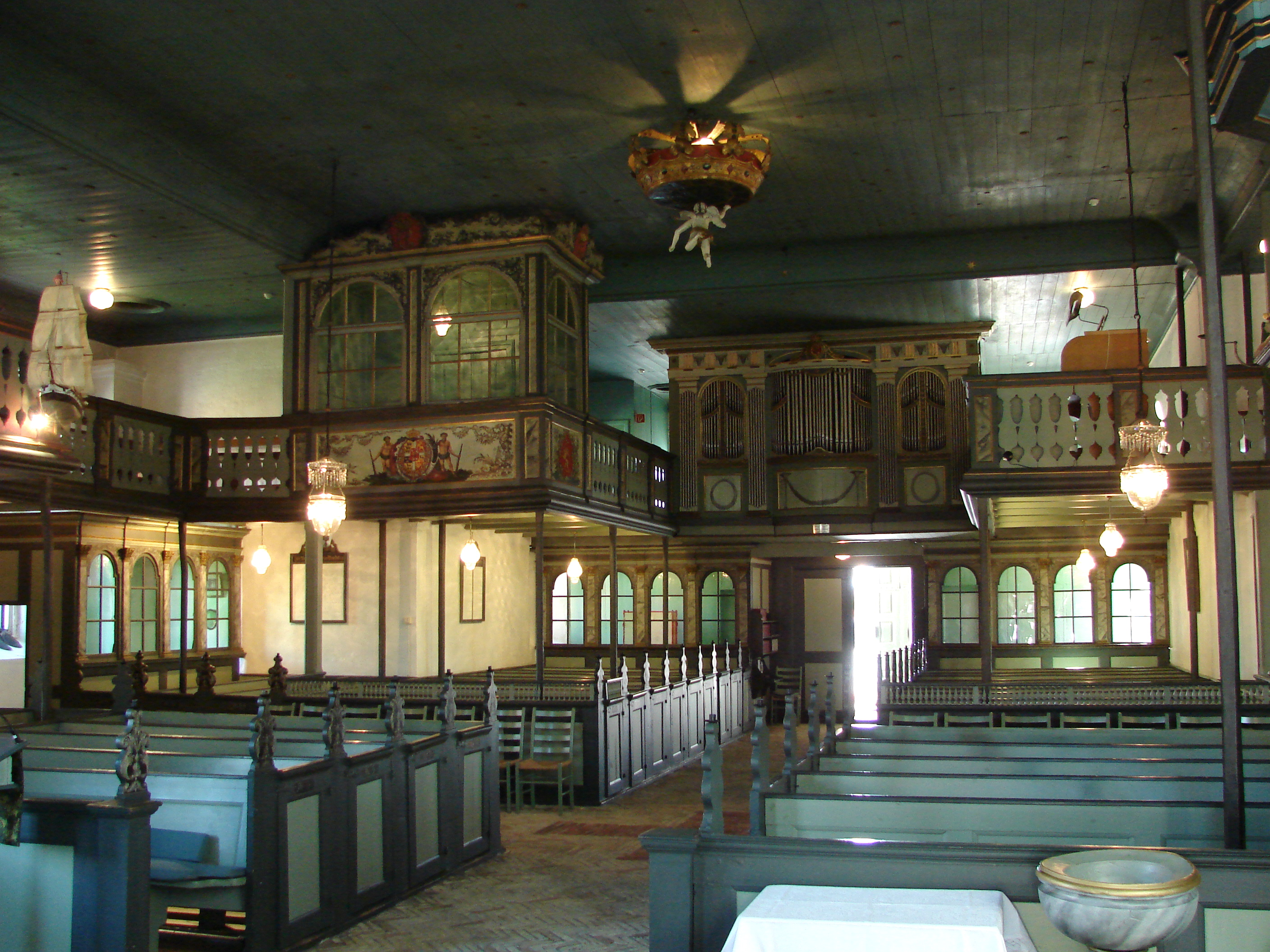

== See also ==
- List of churches in Tunsberg
