= Svenner Lighthouse =

Coastal lighthouse in Norway

Svenner Lighthouse Svenner Fyr
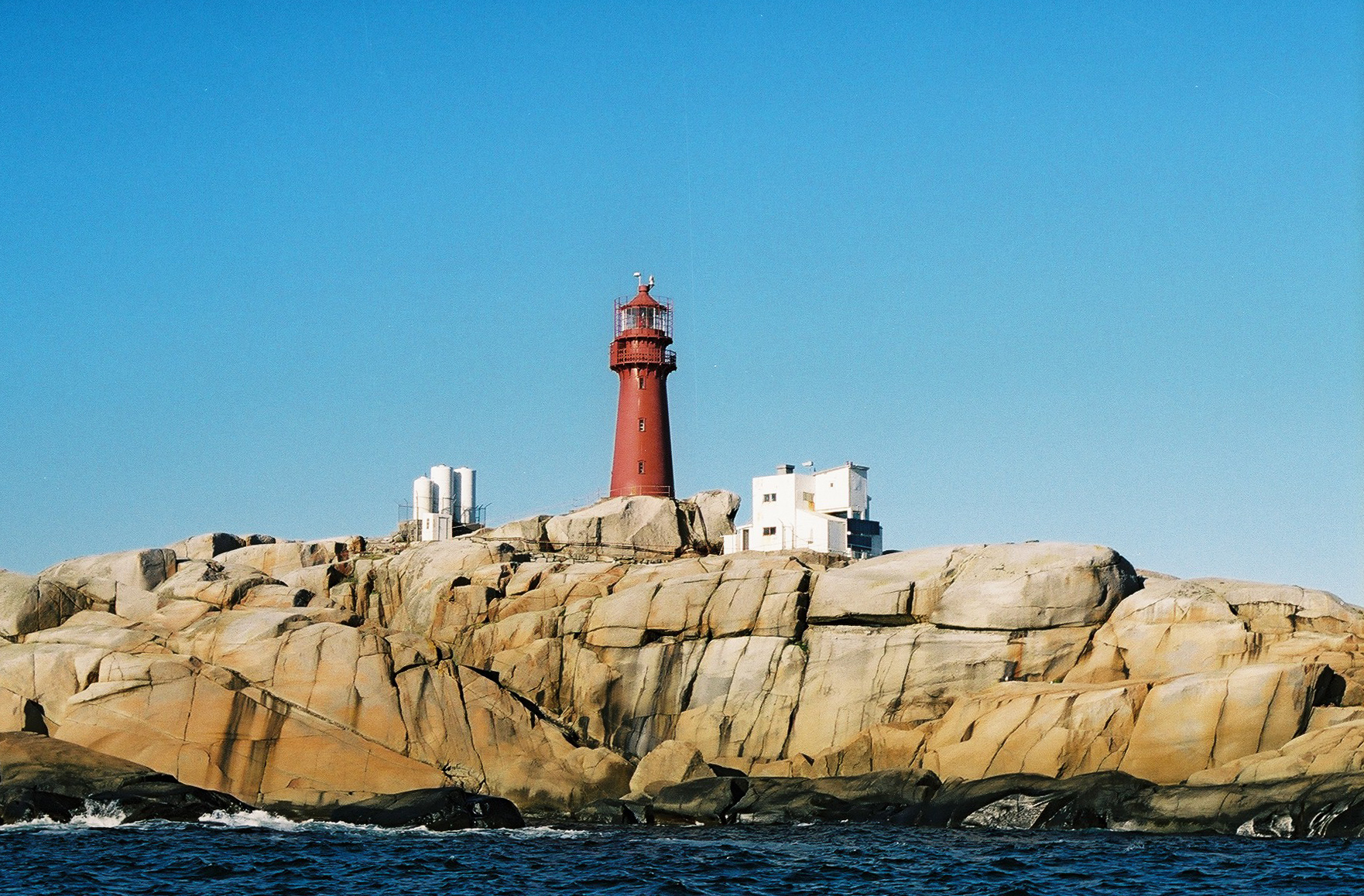
- Location: Svenner, Larvik, Norway
- Coordinates: 58°58′N 10°08′E

Tower
- Constructed: 1874
- Construction: cast iron (tower)
- Automated: 2003
- Height: 18.7 m (61 ft)
- Shape: cylinder
- Markings: Dark red
- Heritage: cultural property

Light
- First lit: 1900
- Focal height: 40 m (130 ft)
- Lens: first order Fresnel lens
- Intensity: 101,700 candela
- Range: 17.8 nmi (33.0 km; 20.5 mi)
- Characteristic: Oc WR 10s

Svenner Lighthouse (Norwegian: Svenner fyr) is a coastal lighthouse in Larvik Municipality in Vestfold, Norway. The lighthouse is located in the Svenner archipelago, about 7 kilometres (4.3 mi) to the southeast of the town of Stavern, near the entrance to the Larviksfjorden. The lighthouse was first lit in 1874. The current tower was built in 1900. The lighthouse was listed as a protected site in 1997, and was automated in 2003.

== See also ==
- Lighthouses in Norway
- List of lighthouses in Norway
