= Arnt Eliassen =

Norwegian meteorologist (1915–2000)

- Born: 9 December 1915; Oslo (Norway)
- Died: 22 April 2000 (aged 84); Bærum (Norway)
- Occupation: Meteorologist
- Employer: Norwegian Meteorological Institute (1942–1953); University of Oslo (1953–1985)
- Children: Anton Eliassen
- Parent(s): Georg Eliassen
- Relatives: Torolv Solheim (brother-in-law)
- Awards: Order of St. Olav (1984); Carl-Gustaf Rossby Research Medal (1965); Balzan Prize (meteorology, Norway, 1996); Vilhelm Bjerknes Medal (1998)

Arnt Eliassen (9 September 1915 – 22 April 2000) was a Norwegian meteorologist who was a pioneer in the use of numerical analysis and computers for weather forecasting.

== Career ==
The early pioneer work was done at the Institute for Advanced Study in Princeton, New Jersey, together with John von Neumann. His areas of research included free and thermally driven circulations, frontogenesis, and shear and gravitational–acoustic wave propagation in stratified media. Eliassen received the Carl-Gustaf Rossby Research Medal in 1964 for his many important contributions to dynamical meteorology. He received the Balzan Prize in 1996 "For his fundamental contributions to dynamic meteorology that have influenced and stimulated progress in this science during the past fifty years". Two years later, he was awarded the Vilhelm Bjerknes Medal for "his outstanding fundamental contributions to dynamical meteorology".

== Personal ==
Eliassen was a brother of architect Trond Eliassen.

He is the father of the meteorologist Anton Eliassen. He resided at Bekkestua.
