= HNoMS Svenner (G03) =

Destroyer owned by the British and Norwegian Navies

Coordinates: 49°27′N 0°15′W

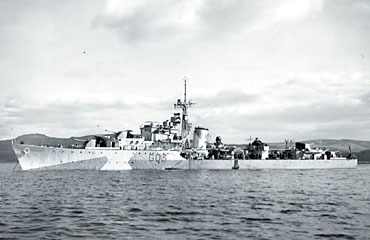
- The S-class destroyer Svenner at Scapa Flow

History

United Kingdom
- Name: Shark
- Builder: Scotts, Greenock
- Laid down: 5 November 1941
- Launched: 1 June 1943
- Identification: Pennant number G03
- Fate: Transferred to Norway

Norway
- Name: Svenner
- Namesake: The island of Svenner
- Commissioned: 11 March 1944
- Fate: Sunk 6 June 1944

General characteristics
- Class & type: S-class destroyer
- Displacement: 1,710 long tons (1,740 t) (standard); 2,530 long tons (2,570 t) (deep load)
- Length: 362 ft 9 in (110.6 m) (o/a)
- Beam: 35 ft 9 in (10.9 m)
- Draught: 14 ft 6 in (4.4 m) (deep)
- Installed power: 40,000 shp (30,000 kW); 2 × Admiralty 3-drum boilers
- Propulsion: 2 × shafts; 2 × Parsons geared steam turbines
- Speed: 36 knots (67 km/h; 41 mph)
- Range: 4,675 nmi (8,658 km; 5,380 mi) at 20 knots (37 km/h; 23 mph)
- Complement: 170
- Sensors & processing systems: Radar Type 290 air warning; Radar Type 285 ranging & bearing
- Armament: 4 × single 4.7-inch (120 mm) Mark XII dual-purpose guns; 1 × twin Bofors 40 mm AA guns; 4 × twin QF 20 mm Oerlikon AA guns; 2 × quadruple 21-inch torpedo tubes; 4 × throwers and 2 × racks for 70 depth charges

HNoMS Svenner was a Royal Norwegian Navy destroyer during the Second World War. She was built for the Royal Navy as the S-class destroyer HMS Shark but on completion was lent to the Norwegian Armed Forces in exile. Svenner was sunk off Sword, one of the Allied landing zones in Normandy, at dawn on 6 June 1944 while supporting the British Army Normandy landings. It was the only Allied ship to be sunk by the Kriegsmarine during the morning of the invasion.

== Description ==
Svenner displaced 1,710 long tons (1,740 t) at standard load and 2,530 long tons (2,570 t) at deep load. She had an overall length of 362 feet 9 inches (110.6 m), a beam of 35 feet 8 inches (10.9 m) and a deep draught of 14 feet 6 inches (4.4 m). She was powered by two Parsons geared steam turbines, each driving one propeller shaft, using steam provided by two Admiralty three-drum boilers. The turbines developed a total of 40,000 shaft horsepower (30,000 kW) and gave a maximum speed of 36 knots (67 km/h; 41 mph). Svenner carried a maximum of 615 long tons (625 t) of fuel oil that gave her a range of 4,675 nautical miles (8,658 km; 5,380 mi) at 20 knots (37 km/h; 23 mph). Her complement was 170 officers and ratings.

The ship was armed with four 45-calibre 4.7-inch (120 mm) Mark XII guns in dual-purpose mounts. For anti-aircraft (AA) defence, Svenner had one twin mount for Bofors 40 mm guns and four twin 20-millimetre (0.8 in) Oerlikon autocannon. She was fitted with two above-water quadruple mounts for 21-inch (533 mm) torpedoes. Two depth charge rails and four throwers were fitted for which 70 depth charges were provided.

== Construction and career ==
The ship was launched on 1 June 1943 as the Royal Navy ship HMS Shark (G03), but when she was commissioned in the Royal Norwegian Navy in 1944, she was rechristened HNoMS Svenner, after the Svenner island group in Larvik, Norway. The ship was hit by two torpedoes fired from one of two German torpedo boats, either Jaguar or Möwe of the 5th Torpedo Boat Flotilla operating out of Le Havre, that managed to get within firing range. Svenner was the only Allied ship to be sunk by German naval activity on the morning of 6 June. She was struck amidships, exploded, broke in two and sank very quickly. Casualties were 1 British and 32 Norwegian crewmen killed, and 185 (15 wounded) rescued from the crew of 219. The anchor from Svenner was recovered in 2003, and now forms 'The Svenner Memorial' at Sword. The memorial can be found approximately 100 yards on the sea-side of the coast road at Hermanville-sur-Mer, Normandy, France.

== Bibliography ==
- Chesneau, Roger, ed. (1980). Conway's All the World's Fighting Ships 1922–1946. Greenwich, UK: Conway Maritime Press. ISBN 0-85177-146-7.
- Colledge, J. J.; Warlow, Ben (2006) [1969]. Ships of the Royal Navy: The Complete Record of All Fighting Ships of the Royal Navy from the 15th Century to the Present (3rd Rev ed.). London: Chatham Publishing. ISBN 978-1-86176-281-8. OCLC 67375475.
- English, John (2001). Obdurate to Daring: British Fleet Destroyers 1941–45. Windsor, UK: World Ship Society. ISBN 978-0-9560769-0-8.
- Lenton, H. T. (1998). British & Empire Warships of the Second World War. Annapolis, Maryland: Naval Institute Press. ISBN 1-55750-048-7.
- Raven, Alan; Roberts, John (1978). War Built Destroyers O to Z Classes. London: Bivouac Books. ISBN 0-85680-010-4.
- Whitley, M. J. (1988). Destroyers of World War 2. Annapolis, Maryland: Naval Institute Press. ISBN 0-87021-326-1.
