= Trond Eliassen =

Norwegian architect (1922–2024)

- Born: 10 October 1922; Kristiania, Norway
- Died: 13 November 2024 (aged 102)
- Occupation: Architect
- Parent: Georg Eliassen
- Relatives: Arnt Eliassen (brother); Anton Eliassen (nephew)
- Awards: Order of St. Olav

Trond Eliassen (10 October 1922 – 13 November 2024) was a Norwegian architect.

== Biography ==
Eliassen was born in Kristiania to architect Georg Eliassen and artist Helfrid Beda Andrea Strömberg, and is a brother of meteorologist Arnt Eliassen. In 1947 he started an architectural company jointly with Birger Lambertz-Nilssen. Their designs include the county hospitals of Vest-Agder, Aust-Agder and Telemark, the Sandefjord town hall, and the Norwegian Maritime Museum. Eliassen was decorated Knight, First Class of the Order of St. Olav in 1983. Eliassen died on 13 November 2024, at the age of 102.
