= Minnehallen =

Military memorial in Vestfold, Norway

Coordinates: 58°59′29″N 10°02′13″E

- Norway
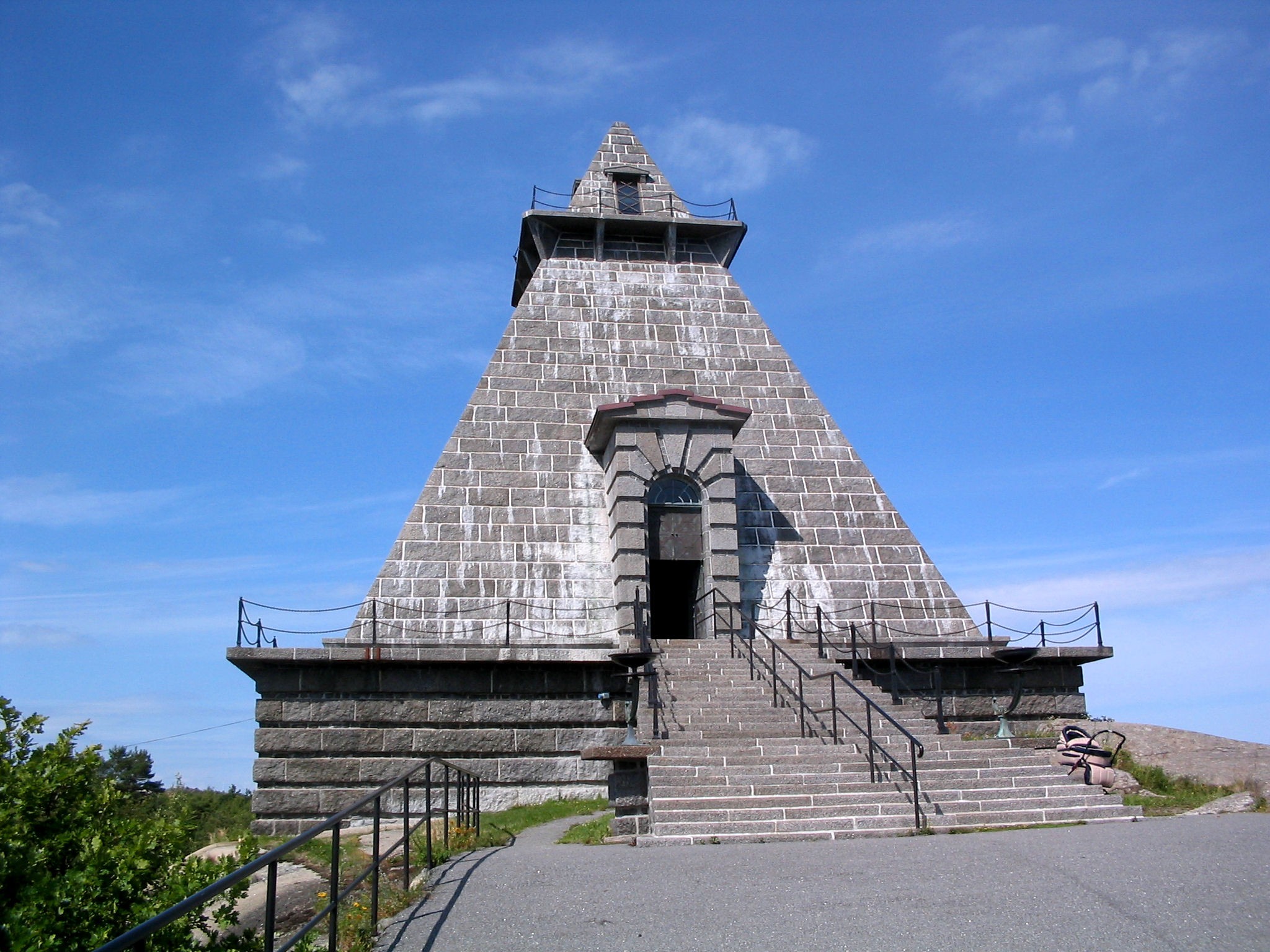
- Minnehallen from the entrance side.
- For Norwegian merchant sailors killed during World War I and World War II.
- Unveiled: 1 August 1926
- Location: near Stavern in Larvik Municipality, Vestfold, Norway.
- Designed by: Andreas H. Bjercke (1883–1967); Georg Christen Eliassen (1880–1964)

Minnehallen or Hall of Remembrance is a national memorial located outside Stavern in Larvik Municipality, Vestfold, Norway.

The memorial was commissioned by the Norwegian Parliament after World War I to commemorate the fallen Norwegian sailors of the war. It was unveiled by King Haakon VII and was later converted to the national monument commemorating fallen sailors of both World War I and World War II. The monument itself is a pyramid of locally quarried rock and is designed by two architects from Oslo, Andreas Hesselberg Bjercke (1883–1967) and Georg Christen Eliassen (1880–1964).

Nic Schiøll has made a relief describing the lives and fate of the sailors as well as a decoration in the crypt. Copper tablets display the names of 1,892 sailors who died during World War I and 3,456 names of sailors who died in World War II. In addition, three protocols contain the names of 5,667 sailors. The interior of the hall is visited by some 20,000 people every year.

Herman Wildenvey wrote Minnehallen, a poem displayed on the rock altar in the hall. The first and last verse read as follows:

Landets egne, mand og kvinne
Konge, folk og raad,
reiste dette æresminde
over sjømænds daad.
Her hvor hav og land som brødre
deler storm og sol
Samles søsken, fædre, mødre,
om et stort symbol

The country's own, man and woman
King, people, and council
raised this remembrance of honor
over the deed of the sailor.
Here where sea and land as brothers
share storm and sun
Bring together siblings, fathers, mothers
around a great symbol.

Hvil i fred, hver fredens kriger
i din våte grav.
Taus du sank, mindet stiger
her som sol av hav.
Atter blir mot dagen hævet
alt som havet tok.
Og vi vet dit navn er skrevet
i en evig bok.

Rest in peace, each warrior for peace
in your watery grave
Silently you sank, the memory ascends
here like the sun of the sea.
Everything which the sea took
is increased by the day.
And we know your name is written
in an eternal book.
