= Larviksfjorden =

Fjord in Vestfold, Norway

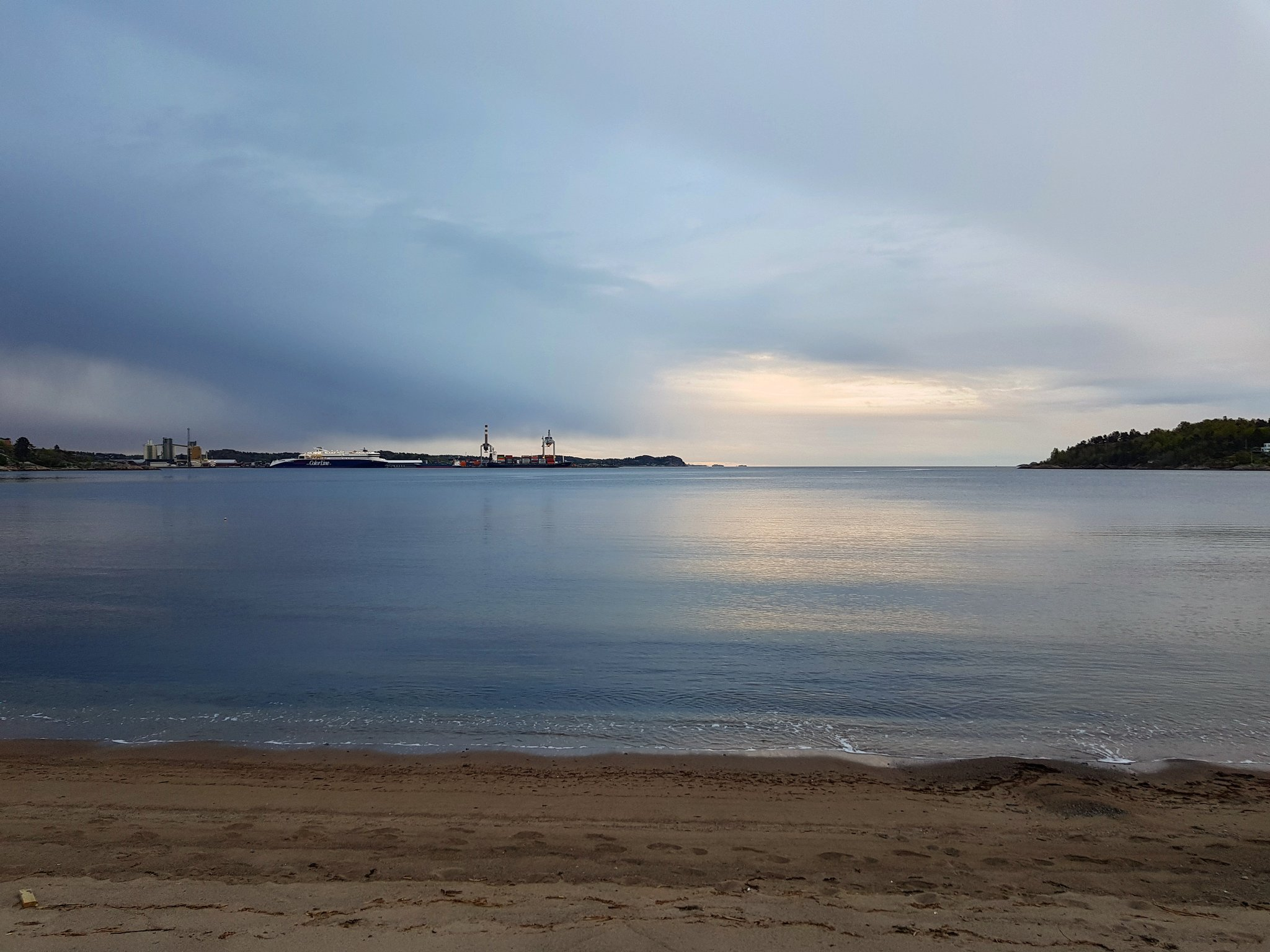
- View of the fjord
- Interactive map of the fjord
- Location: Vestfold county, Norway
- Coordinates: 59.02639°N 10.04417°E
- Type: Fjord
- Primary inflows: Numedalslågen and Farriselva rivers
- Primary outflows: Skaggerak
- Basin countries: Norway
- Max. length: 8 kilometres (5.0 mi)
- Max. width: 3 kilometres (1.9 mi)
- Max. depth: 100 metres (330 ft)
- Settlements: Larvik, Stavern

Larviksfjorden is a fjord in Larvik Municipality in Vestfold county, Norway. The 8-kilometre (5.0 mi) long fjord is about 3 kilometres (1.9 mi) wide at its mouth where it flows out into the Skagerrak. The fjord reaches a depth of 100 metres (330 ft) below sea level. The rivers Numedalslågen and Farriselva both discharge into the fjord. The towns of Stavern and Larvik are both located along the shores of the fjord. The two lighthouses Stavernsodden and Svenner are located near the mouth of the fjord.

== See also ==
- List of Norwegian fjords
