= Staverns Fortress =

Building in Vestfold, Norway

Coordinates: 58°59′45″N 10°02′58″E

- Stavern, Norway
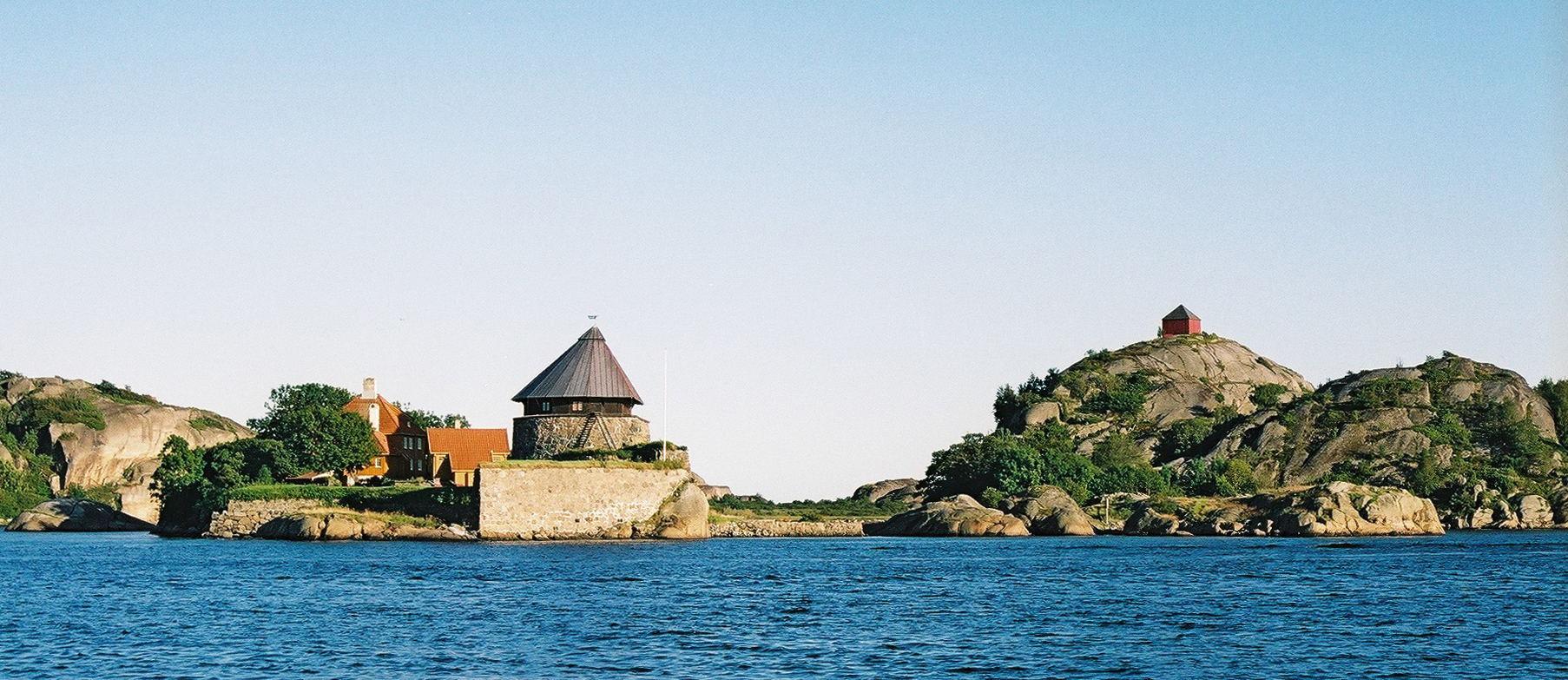
- Staverns Fortress

Site information
- Controlled by: Denmark–Norway, Sweden

Site history
- Built: 1677
- In use: 1677–2002
- Materials: Granite, brick

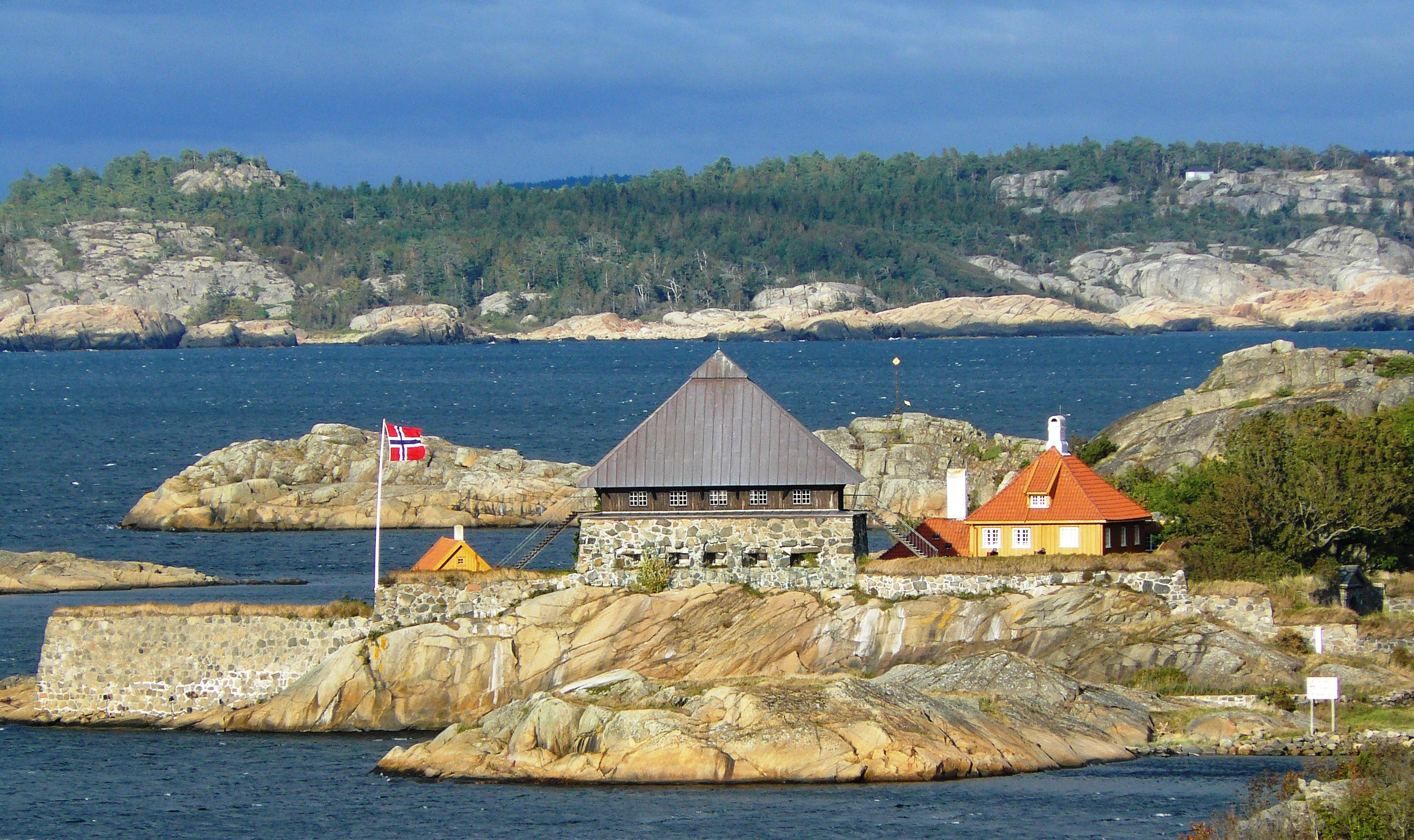
Kruttårnet at Stavern Fort

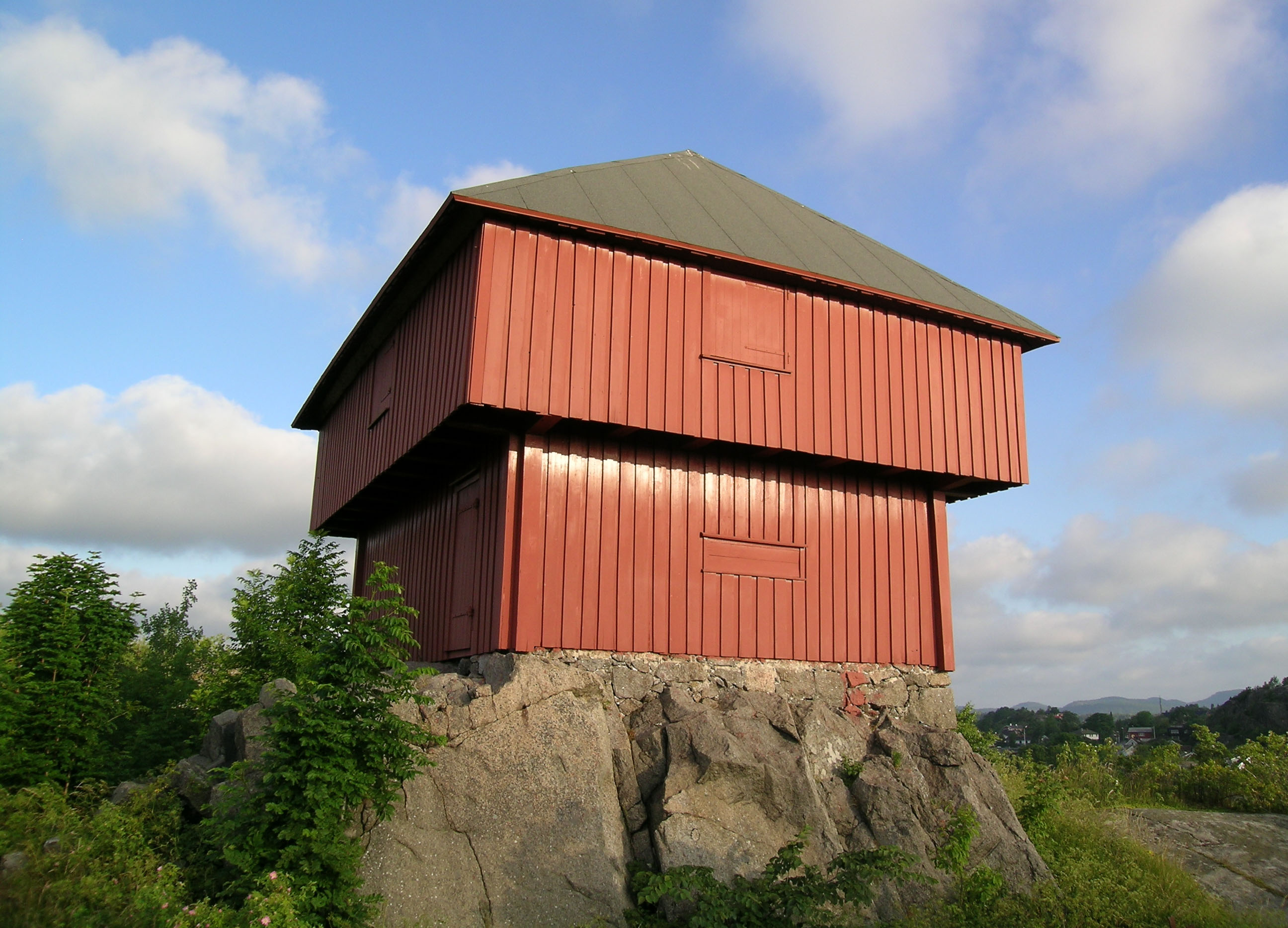
Blockhouse at Staverns Fortress

Staverns Fortress was a military facility located on the island of Citadelløya at Stavern in Vestfold, Norway.

== History ==
The construction of Staverns Fort began in 1677 when Ulrik Frederick Gyldenløve built a blockhouse with battery and palisades on a hill as part of the overall development of Norwegian fortresses. The fort was first built on Karlsøy during the Gyldenløve War (1675–1679). Fredriksvern and Fredriksvern Verft was established as the headquarters for the Norwegian Fleet from 1750 until 1758 so that the older fortification became part of the naval base and called the Citadellet and the island Citadelløya.

The fortress was expanded in 1687 until 1689 to include three canon batteries and a blockhouse. The fortress served as an important base for Norwegian naval hero Tordenskiold and his fleet during the Great Northern War’s final Norwegian phase from 1709 until 1720 and as a central staging point for sea commerce from Denmark in this period. The fort was the home port for the Danish–Norwegian Kattegat squadron. And not least, it served as a major chandelling and forwarding center for canon from the Norwegian ironworks and other equipment.

In the 1800s, Fredriksvern lost its importance as a military base. The Citadellet also lost its military importance and went into decline. In the 1900s, the buildings were restored. Krutttårnet, the oldest constructed building, has a distinctive architecture and today is a well known tourist attraction.
