= Fredriksvern =

Former Norwegian naval base

Coordinates: 58°59′48″N 10°02′21″E

- Stavern, Norway
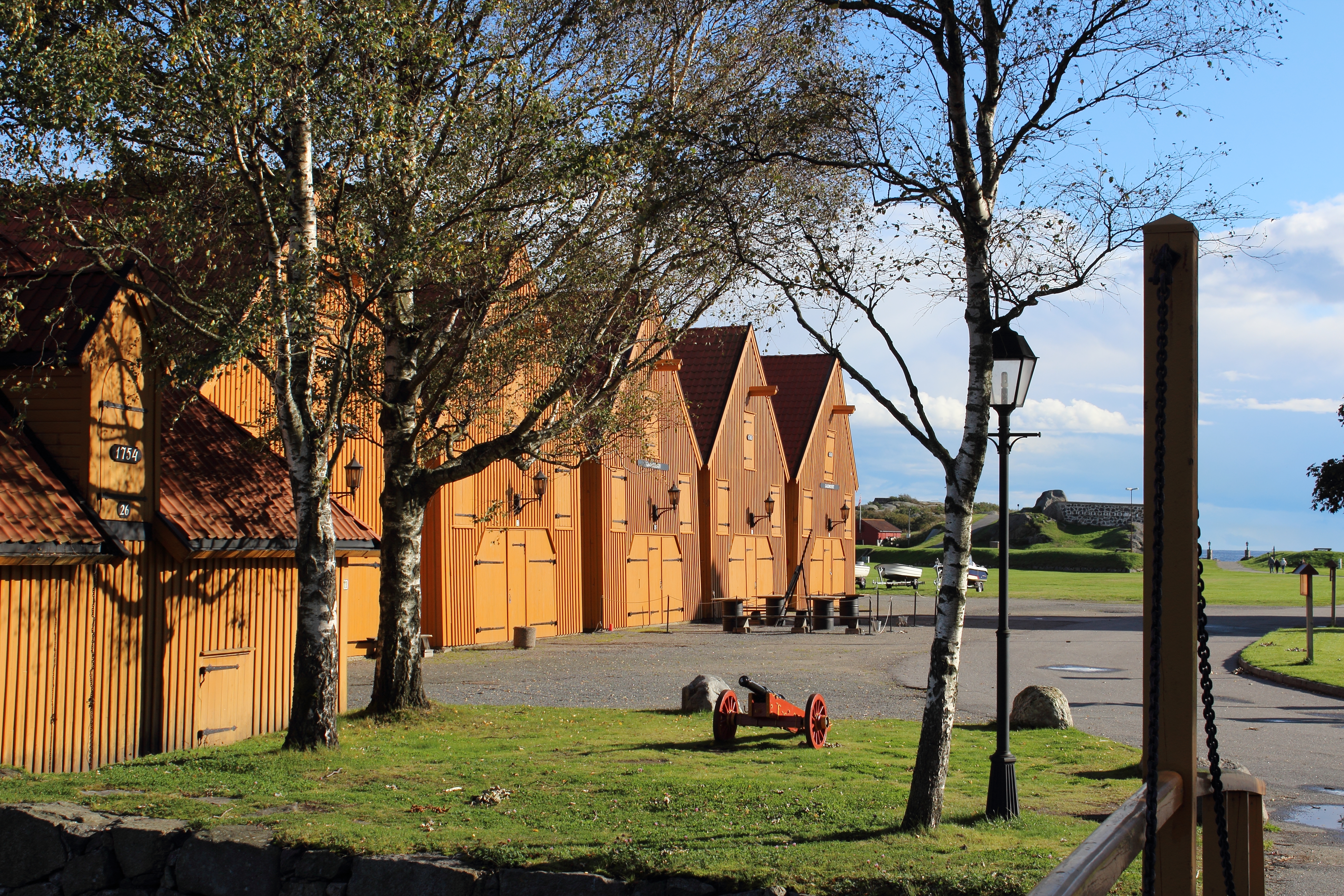
- Fredriksvern Verft - naval base in Stavern

Site information
- Type: Fortress and naval base
- Controlled by: Norway

Site history
- Built: 1677, 1750
- In use: 1677-2002
- Materials: Stone

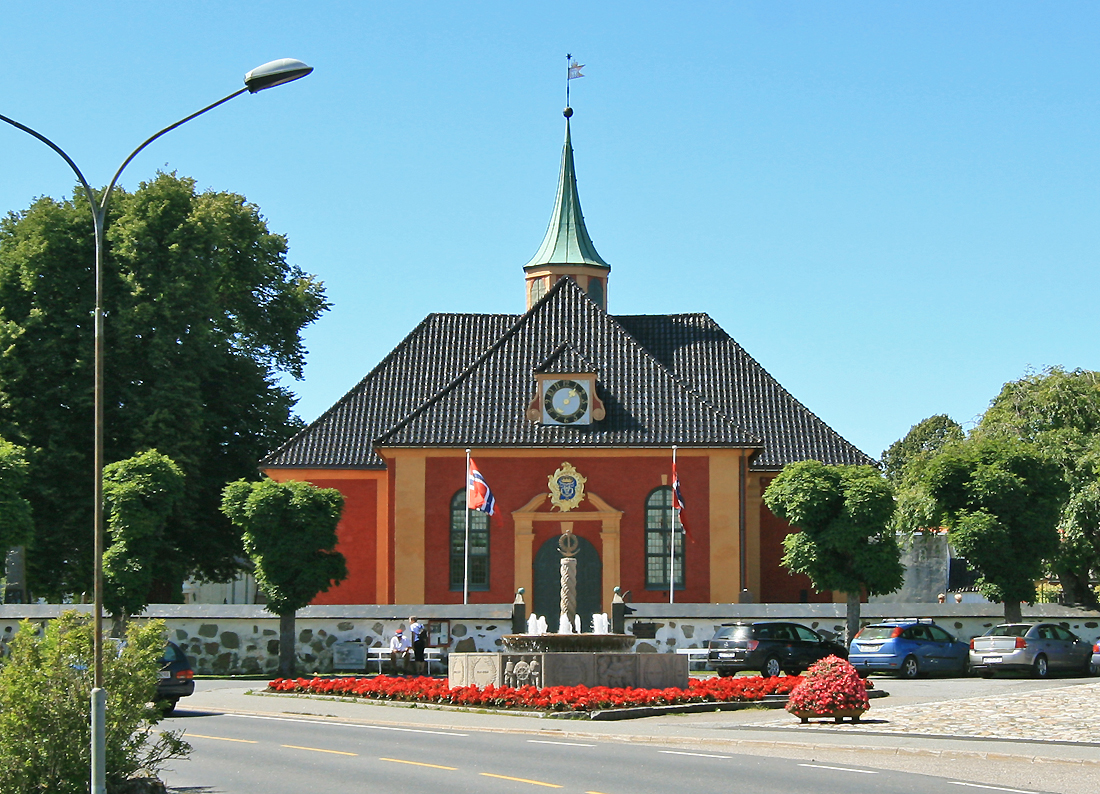
Stavern Church at Fredriksvern

Fredriksvern (also called Friderichsværn (1801), Frederiksværn (1865), Fredriksværen (1900) and abbreviated Frsværn) was an important Norwegian naval base in the town of Stavern, just south of Larvik, in larvik Municipality in Vestfold county. It is named after Fredrik V Denmark-Norway. The town of Stavern has in many ways come to be because of this naval base.

== History ==
The military activities in the harbor of Stavern began with building of Staverns Fortress, part of a major construction of Norwegian Fortresses which took place from 1675 to 1679 under Christian IV. Stavern has probably been a harbor since ancient times. The name is found in written sources the 11th century and in the 12th century it is referred to as a good fishing harbor. Citadellet Fortress was built in the 1680s by count Ulrik Frederik Gyldenløve and had an important role during the last Nordic war from 1709 to 1720.

During the winter of 1748 - 1749 King Fredrik V ordered construction of a shipyard and a drydock in Norway and in 1750 the first Norwegian naval command base was constructed. The king did so as a defensive measure in the event of a war with Sweden. A naval station in Norway could support land strength in the event of a Swedish invasion by cutting off naval transport of Swedish troops and supplies, reducing the risk of such an invasion. Fredriksvern shipyard (Fredriksværns Værft) was finished in 1750 and a number of vessels were built there, including a frigate in 1775.

Stavern Church (Stavern kirke), which was former Fredriksvern Church, was finished in 1756 as the garrison church. It was built after the designs of naval officer and military architect Michael Johan Herbst (1699–1762), who was commander of Fredriksvern Verft. The church reflected influences of both renaissance and baroque architectural styles.

The main base for the Common Fleet was at Copenhagen, but when Norway and Denmark split in 1814 Fredriksvern became the main base for the Royal Norwegian Navy. The Common fleet had been decimated by the British robbery in 1807 and the Norwegians got the lesser share of what was left when the union was ended. It soon became apparent that major expansion of the navy had to take place. Fredriksvern had one strategic flaw, it was difficult to defend from a land based attack. In addition its capacity was too small for the new expanded navy. Already in 1815 it was decided to look for a new location for the main naval base. But Norway was extremely poor and both the fleet expansion and the building of the new base was delayed. During the 1830s a new main naval base was constructed at Horten, but Fredriksvern continued to be an important naval base and remained active as an air force academy until 2002.

== Related Reading ==
- Norges festninger by Guthorm Kavli; Universitetsforlaget; 1987; ISBN 82-00-18430-7
