= Anton Eliassen =

Norwegian meteorologist (born 1945)

- Born: 11 November 1945 (age 79); Oslo, Norway
- Occupation: Meteorologist
- Parent: Arnt Eliassen
- Relatives: Trond Eliassen (uncle)
- Awards: Order of St. Olav

Anton Eliassen (born 11 November 1945) is a Norwegian meteorologist.

He was born in Oslo to meteorologist Arnt Eliassen and Ellen-Kristine Nome. He graduated from the University of Oslo as cand. real. in 1970. He was assigned with the Norwegian Institute for Air Research from 1972 to 1977, was researcher at the Norwegian Meteorological Institute from 1978 to 1983, and was appointed professor at the University of Oslo from 1983. His research interests have focused on air pollution transport and climate modelling. He was decorated Knight, First Class of the Order of St. Olav in 2006.
