= Torolv Solheim =

Norwegian educator, essayist, resistance member and politician

- Born: Torolv Magneson Solheim; 7 November 1907; Radøy, Norway
- Died: 23 May 1995 (aged 87); Norway
- Education: University of Oslo (economics, 1933); Actuarial examination (1939)
- Occupations: Educator, author, politician, magazine editor
- Years active: 1932–1995
- Known for: Editor of Fossegrimen magazine Chairman of Socialist People's Party; World War II resistance member
- Movement: Communist Party of Norway (1940–1945); Norwegian Labour Party (1945–1952); Socialist People's Party (1961–1975); Socialist Left Party (1975–1985)
- Spouse: Rønnaug Eliassen (m. 1940)
- Children: Jorun Solheim
- Parent(s): Magne Solheim; Georgine Husebø

Chairman of the Socialist People's Party
- In office 1969–1971
- Preceded by: Knut Løfsnes
- Succeeded by: Finn Gustavsen

Torolv Solheim (7 November 1907 – 23 May 1995) was a Norwegian lecturer, historian, author, social economist and politician. Originally a member of the Communist Party of Norway, he later joined the Norwegian Labour Party and was amongst the founders of the Socialist People's Party in 1961, serving as its chairman from 1969 to 1971. He subsequently became a member of the Socialist Left Party. From 1954 to 1968, he edited the influential cultural and political magazine Fossegrimen, which became a significant platform for left-wing intellectual discourse in post-war Norway.

== Education and early career ==
Solheim attended Firda gymnasium, graduating in 1929, before reading economics at the University of Oslo, where he obtained his degree in 1933. He later completed his actuarial examination in 1939. During his university years, he was actively involved in left-wing politics, co-founding the Communist Student Group in 1932 alongside Viggo Hansteen and Jacob Friis.

== Political career ==
=== Early political involvement ===
Solheim's political activism began during his student years when he established the Communist Student Group and served as editor of the group's magazine "Kringsjaa" from 1938 to 1939. He became a member of the Communist Party of Norway in 1940, but following disagreements with party leader Peder Furubotn after the war, he joined the Norwegian Labour Party in 1945, remaining a member until 1952.

=== Opposition politics and party formation ===
During the 1950s, Solheim grew increasingly critical of the Labour Party's foreign and domestic policies, particularly what he perceived as the party's subservience to the United States and McCarthyism. This opposition led him to become one of the founding members of the Socialist People's Party in 1961. He served as chairman of the party's Telemark county organisation and represented the party on Porsgrunn city council from 1963 to 1971. At the party's congress in 1969, Solheim was elected chairman, a position he held until Finn Gustavsen succeeded him in 1971. When the Socialist People's Party merged into the Socialist Left Party in 1975, Solheim joined the new organisation but left in 1985 over political disagreements.

== Resistance activities during World War II ==
During the Second World War, Solheim played an active role in the Norwegian resistance movement. In 1942, he helped establish the illegal newspaper "Alt for Norge", which became one of the most significant Communist-affiliated underground publications of the occupation period.

During the winter of 1943–44, Solheim operated from the Communist Party's central hideout in Valdres, where he wrote articles for various illegal newspapers. Following his disagreement with Peder Furubotn, he returned to western Norway in late winter 1944, where he became a leading figure in the "Western Freedom Council", described as the only regional freedom council to achieve significant success. During this period, he also edited the underground newspaper "Gjallarhorn".

== Professional career ==
After the war, Solheim held various positions in both the private and public sectors. From 1949 to 1952, he served as director of Fiskarlaget shipyard AS Stongfjordanlegget. He subsequently operated a sawmill near Risør before transitioning to education in 1959. He worked as a lecturer, first in Brevik, then at Porsgrunn gymnasium until his retirement in 1974.

== Fossegrimen magazine ==
Solheim's most significant cultural contribution was his editorship of Fossegrimen, a magazine he founded in 1954 and ran independently until 1968. The publication was built upon language-political, socialist and national foundations, positioning itself in opposition to the Labour Party's policies, particularly in foreign affairs, whilst also challenging left-wing socialist circles in Oslo.

Fossegrimen served as an important platform for Norwegian writers and intellectuals. Regular contributors included the prominent author Georg Johannesen, novelist Axel Jensen and poets Einar Økland and Tor Obrestad.

== Publications ==
Solheim was a prolific author whose works reflected his political convictions and cultural interests:

- Samtidsprofilar (Contemporary Profiles, 1964) – a collection of his articles from Fossegrimen
- Vestavær (Western Weather, 1967) – further articles from Fossegrimen
- I solnedgangstider (In Sunset Times, 1976) – wartime memoirs covering the period 1940–45
- En strilekrønike (A Strile Chronicle, 1978) – concerning the Strile people of western Norway
- Epistlar. Frå det skjulte Norge (Epistles: From Hidden Norway, 1987)
- Det norske lynnet. Humor frå Edda til gate og grend (The Norwegian Temperament: Humour from Edda to Street and Village, Samlaget, 1997)

== Legacy ==
Torolv Solheim was described by Georg Johannesen as simultaneously a "beekeeper, poet, partisan, heretic and fisherman". His combination of political activism, cultural engagement, and literary output established him as a significant figure in post-war Norwegian intellectual life. Through Fossegrimen, he provided a platform for alternative voices during a period of political conformity in Norway, whilst his own writings captured the tensions between traditional Norwegian culture and modern political realities.
