= Stavern =

Town in Vestfold county, Norway

Stavern Fredriksvern (historic)
- Town/City
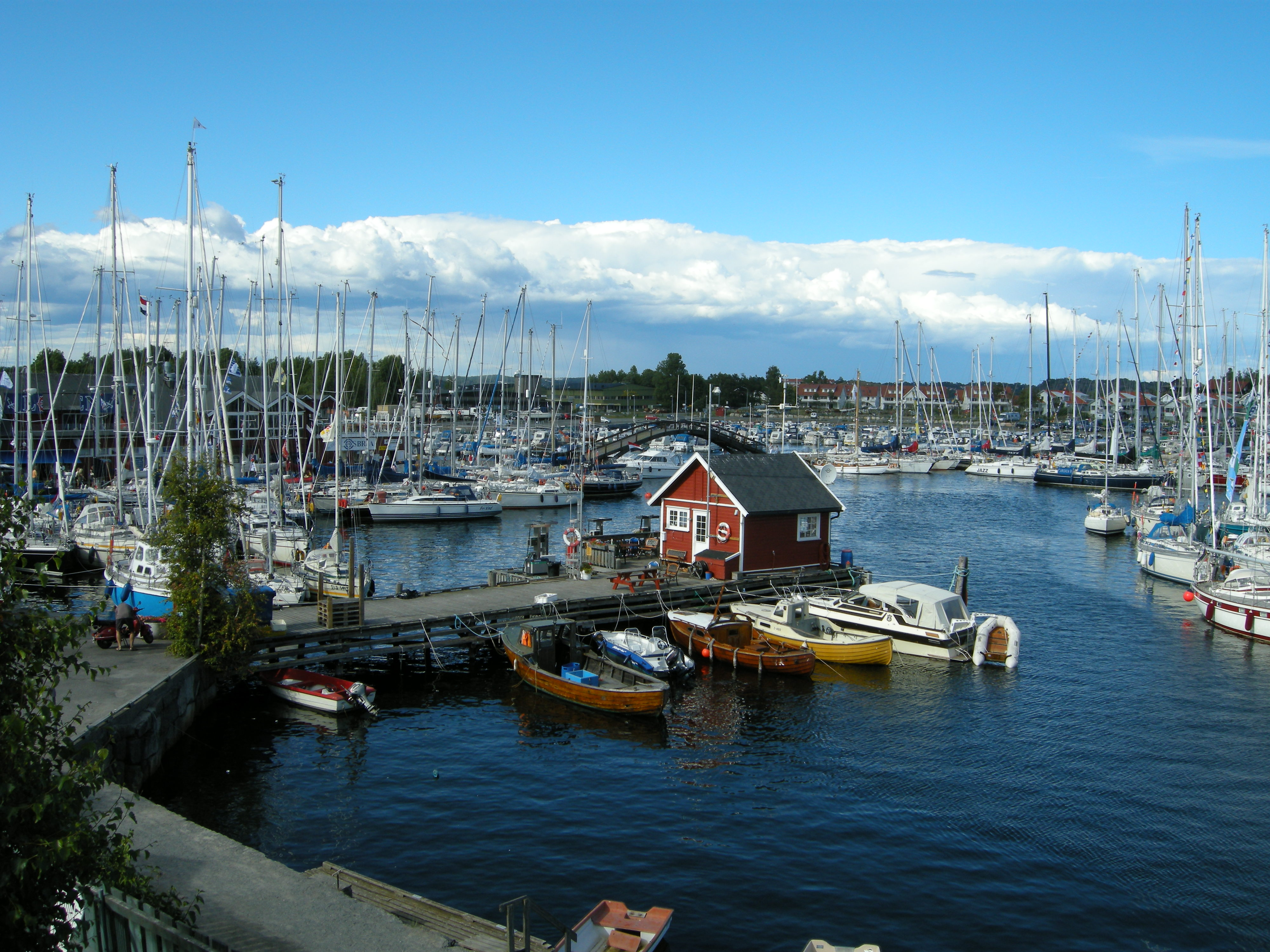
- View of the town harbour
- Interactive map of Stavern
- Coordinates: 58.9983°N 10.03557°E
- Country: Norway
- Region: Eastern Norway
- County: Vestfold
- Municipality: Larvik Municipality
- Established as
- Kjøpstad: 1943–1988
- Town (By): 2010

Area
  - Total: 3.74 km^{2} (1.44 sq mi)
- Elevation: 6 m (20 ft)

Population (2026)
  - Total: 6,159
  - Density: 1,647/km^{2} (4,270/sq mi)
- Demonym: Stavering
- Time zone: UTC+01:00 (CET)
  - Summer (DST): UTC+02:00 (CEST)
- Post Code: 3290 Stavern
- Former municipality
- Stavern kjøpstad Fredriksvern kjøpstad (historic)
- Vestfold within Norway

- Stavern within Vestfold
- Country: Norway
- County: Vestfold
- District: Vestfold
- Established: 1 Jan 1838
  - Created as: Formannskapsdistrikt
- Disestablished: 1 Jan 1988
  - Succeeded by: Larvik Municipality
- Administrative centre: Stavern

Area (upon dissolution)
  - Total: 2.4 km^{2} (0.93 sq mi)
  - Rank: #454 in Norway

Population (1987)
  - Total: 2,538
  - Rank: #336 in Norway
  - Density: 1,057.5/km^{2} (2,739/sq mi)
  - Change (10 years): ▼ −3.8%
- Demonym: Stavring

Official language
  - Norwegian form: Bokmål
- Time zone: UTC+01:00 (CET)
  - Summer (DST): UTC+02:00 (CEST)
- ISO 3166 code: NO-0708

Stavern (Norwegian pronunciation: [²staːvæɳ]; locally [²staːvæɾn]; until 1930 named Fredriksvern) is a town in Larvik Municipality in Vestfold county, Norway. The town is located at the mouth of the Larviksfjorden along the Skagerrak coast, about 7 kilometres (4.3 mi) south of the town of Larvik. Historically, Stavern was a self-governing municipality from 1838 until 1988 when it became part of the large Larvik Municipality. Stavern Church is located in the town.

The 3.74-square-kilometre (920-acre) town has a population (2026) of 6,149 and a population density of 1,747 inhabitants per square kilometre (4,520/sq mi).

Stavern is a small town where tourism is one of the most important sources of income. During summer, the population increases to around 30,000-40,000 people, due to camping sites and cottages around the town centre as well as boats visiting the harbour. Stavern experiences about 200 days of sunshine per year. From the mid-1750s until 1864, Stavern was home to the nation's main naval base located in a shipyard in Fredriksvern. A gunpowder tower and commandant's house remain on Citadel Island, a current refuge for artists. The town is also home of the Hall of Remembrance, a monument dedicated to seamen killed during World War I and World War II.

== History ==
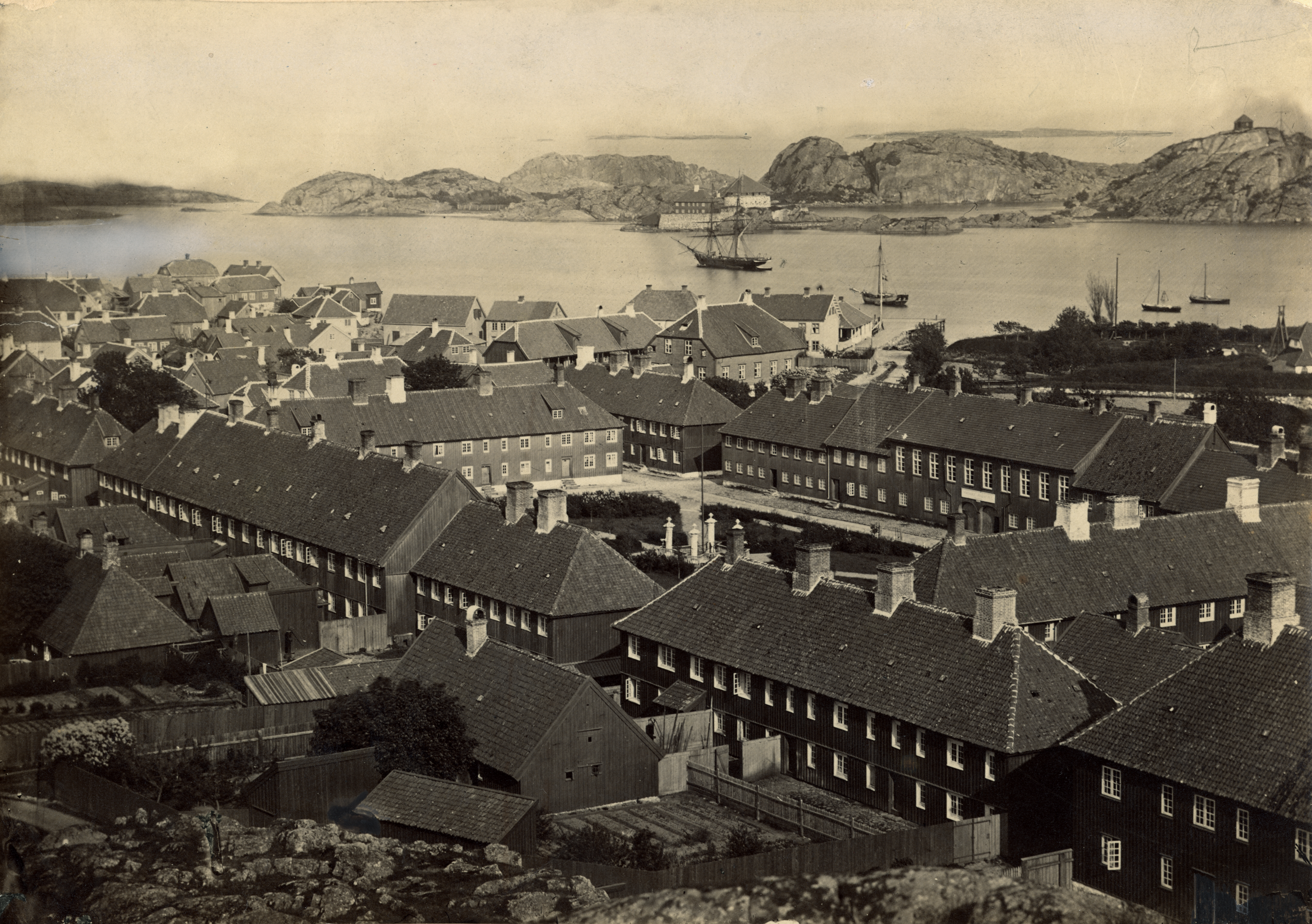
Historic photo of Stavern

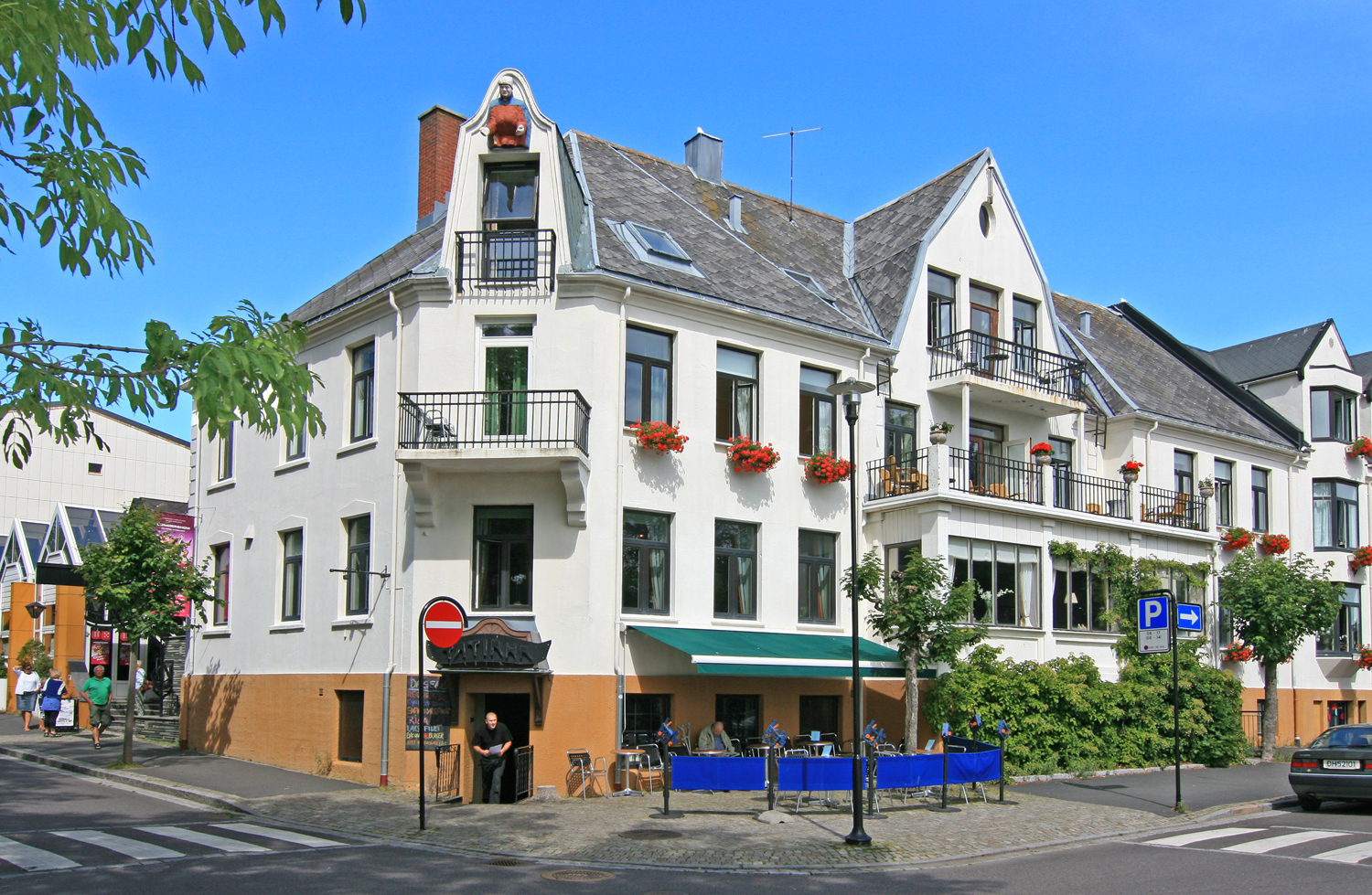
Stavern Wasilioff

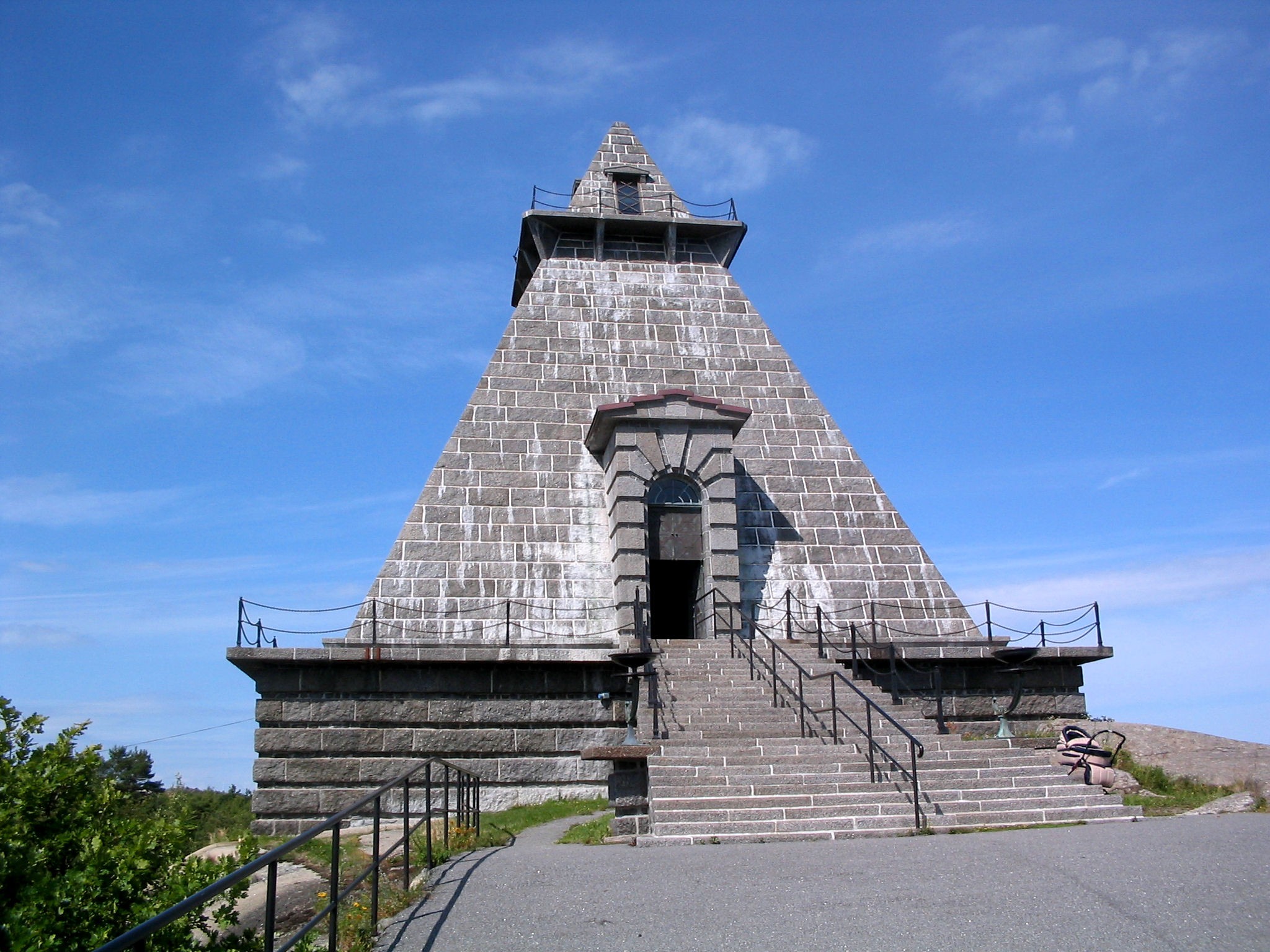
Minnehallen in Stavern. National monument commemorating the sailors killed during World War I and World War II

Stavern has probably been a harbour since ancient times. The name is found in written sources from the 11th century and the 12th century where it is referred to as a good fishing harbour. Stavern in the 17th and 18th century was an important port for civil ship traffic from Norway to Denmark and Sweden.

The harbour was a major port and naval base for Staverns Fortress (until 1930 named Fredriksvern). As this was one of Norway's most important naval facilities, it was established as a municipality on 1 January 1838 (see formannskapsdistrikt law). It was one of Norway's smallest municipalities. Even though it was an important port it was not given the status as a town (kjøpstad) until 1 July 1942. The small town and municipality of Stavern was merged with the larger town of Larvik 1 January 1988.

Its former and current name is Stavern, but from 1799 to 1930 the town was named Fredriksværn as its only function was as the site of that naval base, so it shared the same name as the base. In 1930, the municipality was renamed Stavern. From 1942 the town was Norway's smallest until it merged with Larvik Municipality in 1988 and lost its town status. In 1996, the municipality of Larvik voted to restore Stavern to town status.

During the 20th century, Stavern became a popular site for artists and craftsmen. The poet Herman Wildenvey, the writer Jonas Lie as well as the painters Hans Gude and Christian Krohg all lived in Stavern at some point in their lives. Today, the town is well known in southern Norway for its many exhibitions and art galleries. Stavern also is the site of Minnehallen, the national memorial to fallen sailors of World War I and World War II and a statue of the 18th century naval hero Peder Tordenskjold.

=== Name ===
The municipality (originally the harbour area) is named after the old Staværn farm (Old Norse: Staferni) since the Fredriksvern naval base and shipyard was built there. The first element is stafr which means "staff" or "stick" (the reason for this is unknown, but see Stavanger#Name). The last element is the suffix -erni which has an unknown meaning, but it is often used in names of islands. In the late-1700s, the prefix Fredriks- was added to the old farm name to create the name Fredriksværn. The prefix was added in honor of the King of Denmark-Norway, Fredrik V. In 1930, the old name Stavern was brought back into use.

== Municipal self-government (1838-1988) ==
=== Administrative history ===
The formannskapsdistrikt law of 1837 created a system of local government in Norway by establishing each town (ladested or kjøpstad) and each Church of Norway prestegjeld as a civil municipality. On 1 January 1838, the port and naval base of Fredriksværn was established as Fredriksvern Municipality (later spelled Stavern). The municipality was less than 1.5 square kilometres (0.58 sq mi), making it one of the smallest in Norway. It was surrounded by Brunlanes Municipality.

On 23 June 1883, an area of Brunlanes Municipality (population: 22) was transferred to Fredriksvern Municipality. In 1930, the municipal name was changed to Stavern. In 1938, another area of Brunlanes Municipality (population: 28) was transferred to Stavern Municipality. In 1943, the government of Norway granted Stavern the status of a kjøpstad (town status). Again, in 1949, an area of Brunlanes Municipality (population: 13) was transferred to Stavern Municipality. On 1 January 1969, another area of Brunlanes Municipality (population: 4) was transferred into Stavern Municipality.

On 1 January 1988, Stavern Municipality was dissolved and the following areas were merged to form an enlarged Larvik Municipality with a population of 37,048 people:

- all of Stavern Municipality (population: 2,538)
- all of Brunlanes Municipality (population: 8,138)
- all of Hedrum Municipality (population: 10,449)
- all of Larvik Municipality (population: 8,045)
- all of Tjølling Municipality (population: 7,878)

=== Government ===
While it existed, Stavern Municipality was responsible for primary education (through 10th grade), outpatient health services, senior citizen services, welfare and other social services, zoning, economic development, and municipal roads and utilities. The municipality was governed by a municipal council of directly elected representatives. The mayor was indirectly elected by a vote of the municipal council. The municipality was under the jurisdiction of the Larvik District Court and the Agder Court of Appeal.

=== Municipal council ===
The municipal council (Bystyre) of Stavern Municipality was made up of representatives that were elected to four year terms. The tables below show the historical composition of the council by political party.

Stavern bystyre 1983–1987
Party name (in Norwegian)	Number of representatives
Labour Party (Arbeiderpartiet)	8
Conservative Party (Høyre)	9
Joint list of the Christian Democratic Party (Kristelig Folkeparti), Liberal People's Party (Liberale Folkepartiet), and Liberal Party (Venstre)	4
Total number of members:	21
Note: On 1 January 1988, Stavern Municipality became part of Larvik Municipality.

Stavern bystyre 1979–1983
Party name (in Norwegian)	Number of representatives
Labour Party (Arbeiderpartiet)	7
Conservative Party (Høyre)	9
Christian Democratic Party (Kristelig Folkeparti)	1
Joint list of the Liberal Party (Venstre) and New People's Party (Nye Folkepartiet)	4
Total number of members:	21

Stavern bystyre 1975–1979
Party name (in Norwegian)	Number of representatives
Labour Party (Arbeiderpartiet)	9
Conservative Party (Høyre)	7
Christian Democratic Party (Kristelig Folkeparti)	2
Joint list of the Liberal Party (Venstre) and New People's Party (Nye Folkepartiet)	3
Total number of members:	21

Stavern bystyre 1971–1975
Party name (in Norwegian)	Number of representatives
Labour Party (Arbeiderpartiet)	10
Conservative Party (Høyre)	6
Christian Democratic Party (Kristelig Folkeparti)	1
Liberal Party (Venstre)	4
Total number of members:	21

Stavern bystyre 1967–1971
Party name (in Norwegian)	Number of representatives
Labour Party (Arbeiderpartiet)	9
Conservative Party (Høyre)	7
Liberal Party (Venstre)	5
Total number of members:	21

Stavern bystyre 1963–1967
Party name (in Norwegian)	Number of representatives
Labour Party (Arbeiderpartiet)	8
Conservative Party (Høyre)	8
Liberal Party (Venstre)	5
Total number of members:	21

Stavern bystyre 1959–1963
Party name (in Norwegian)	Number of representatives
Labour Party (Arbeiderpartiet)	7
Conservative Party (Høyre)	8
Liberal Party (Venstre)	6
Total number of members:	21

Stavern bystyre 1955–1959
Party name (in Norwegian)	Number of representatives
Labour Party (Arbeiderpartiet)	9
Conservative Party (Høyre)	8
Liberal Party (Venstre)	4
Total number of members:	21

Stavern bystyre 1951–1955
Party name (in Norwegian)	Number of representatives
Labour Party (Arbeiderpartiet)	7
Conservative Party (Høyre)	7
Liberal Party (Venstre)	6
Total number of members:	20

Stavern bystyre 1948–1951
Party name (in Norwegian)	Number of representatives
Labour Party (Arbeiderpartiet)	7
Conservative Party (Høyre)	8
Joint list of the Liberal Party (Venstre) and the Radical People's Party (Radikale Folkepartiet)	5
Total number of members:	20

Stavern bystyre 1945–1947
Party name (in Norwegian)	Number of representatives
Labour Party (Arbeiderpartiet)	7
Conservative Party (Høyre)	7
Local List(s) (Lokale lister)	6
Total number of members:	20

Stavern herredsstyre 1937–1941*
Party name (in Norwegian)	Number of representatives
Labour Party (Arbeiderpartiet)	3
Conservative Party (Høyre)	8
Local List(s) (Lokale lister)	5
Total number of members:	16
Note: Due to the German occupation of Norway during World War II, no elections were held for new municipal councils until after the war ended in 1945.

=== Mayors ===
The mayor (Norwegian: ordfører) of Stavern Municipality was the political leader of the municipality and the chairperson of the municipal council. The following people have held this position:

- 1888–1895: Carl Henry Fyhn (V)
- 1946–1947: Birger Carlson (Ap)
- 1948–1955: Einar Schøning (H)
- 1956–1959: Einar Aksdal (V)
- 1960–1961: Arent Schøning (H)
- 1962–1963: Einar Aksdal (V)
- 1964–1965: Frank Hansen (H)
- 1965–1965: Einar Aksdal (V)
- 1966–1967: Arne Christoffersen (Ap)
- 1968–1975: Einar Aksdal (V)
- 1976–1983: Arne Høyem (H)
- 1984–1987: Kåre Tørresdal (Ap)

== Notable people ==
- Hjalmar Hjorth Boyesen, a Norwegian-American author who was born at Fredriksvern

== See also ==
- List of towns and cities in Norway
- List of former municipalities of Norway
