= Sandstad Municipality =

Former municipality in Trøndelag, Norway

Sandstad Municipality Sandstad herred
- Former municipality
- Sør-Trøndelag within Norway

- Sandstad within Sør-Trøndelag
- Coordinates: 63.5224°N 09.0954°E
- Country: Norway
- County: Sør-Trøndelag
- District: Fosen
- Established: 1 July 1914
  - Preceded by: Fillan Municipality
- Disestablished: 1 Jan 1964
  - Succeeded by: Hitra Municipality
- Administrative centre: Sandstad

Government
  - Mayor (1956-1963): Olaf Sivertsen (Ap)

Area (upon dissolution)
  - Total: 160.2 km^{2} (61.9 sq mi)
  - Rank: #425 in Norway
- Highest elevation: 345 m (1,132 ft)

Population (1963)
  - Total: 1,030
  - Rank: #609 in Norway
  - Density: 6.4/km^{2} (17/sq mi)
  - Change (10 years): ▼ −5.9%
- Demonym: Sandstadværing

Official language
  - Norwegian form: Neutral
- Time zone: UTC+01:00 (CET)
  - Summer (DST): UTC+02:00 (CEST)
- ISO 3166 code: NO-1615

Sandstad is a former municipality in the old Sør-Trøndelag county, Norway. The 160-square-kilometre (62 sq mi) municipality existed from 1914 until its dissolution in 1964 when it was merged into what is now Hitra Municipality in Trøndelag county. The former Sandstad Municipality included all of the southern and southeastern parts of the island of Hitra, plus the several islands in the Trondheimsleia off the shores of the island of Hitra. The municipality had one church, Sandstad Church, located in the village of Sandstad.

Prior to its dissolution in 1963, the 160-square-kilometre (62 sq mi) municipality was the 425th largest by area out of the 689 municipalities in Norway. Sandstad Municipality was the 609th most populous municipality in Norway with a population of about 1,030. The municipality's population density was 6.4 inhabitants per square kilometre (17/sq mi) and its population had decreased by 5.9% over the previous 10-year period.

== General information ==
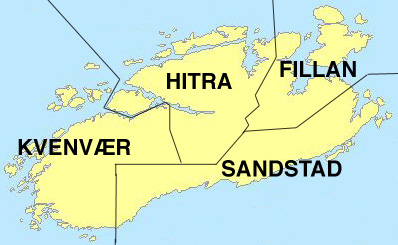
Map of the old municipal boundaries on the island of Hitra

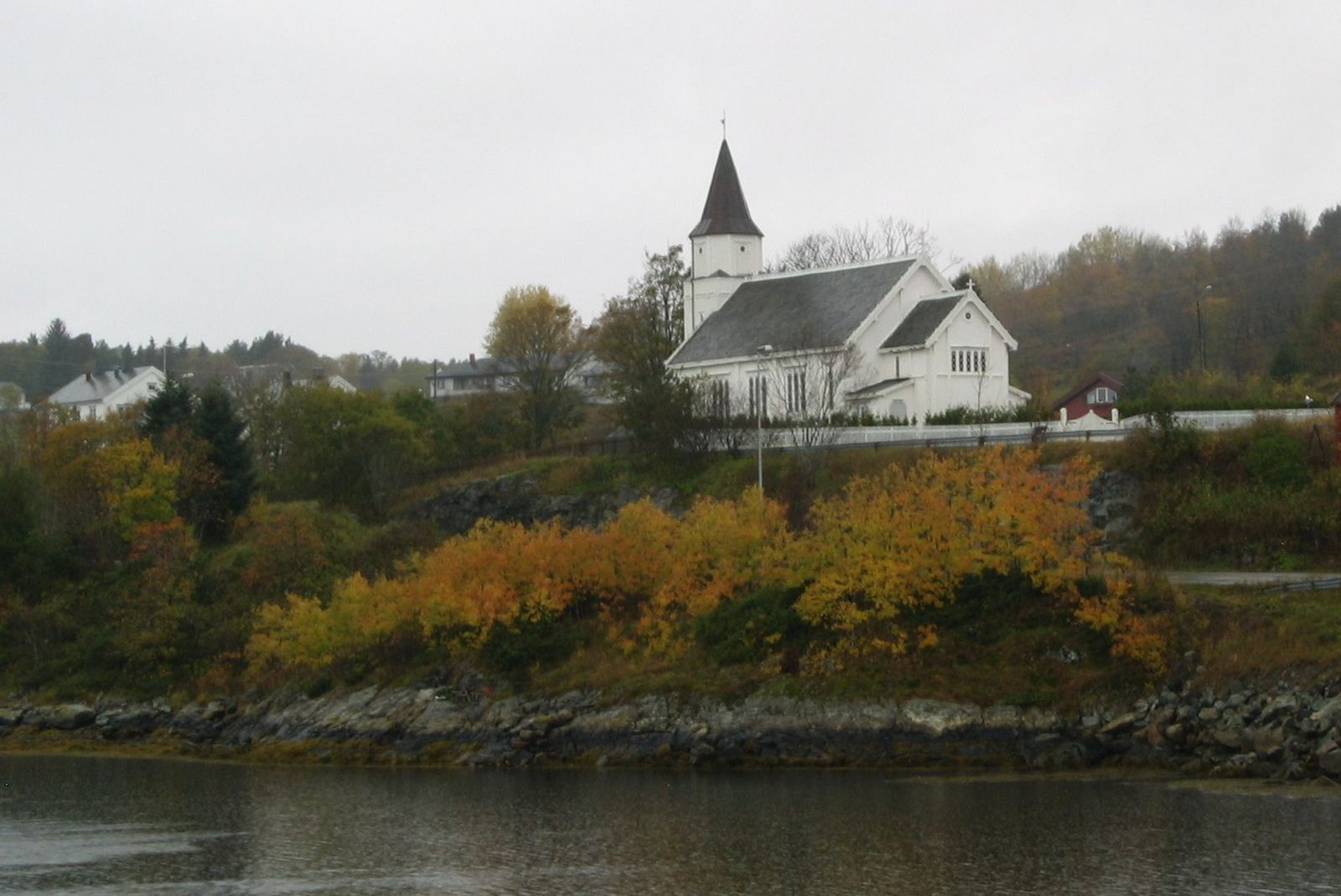
Sandstad Church

On 1 July 1914, Fillan Municipality was divided into two separate municipalities: Fillan Municipality (population: 1,543) in the north and the new Sandstad Municipality (population: 947) in the south. During the 1960s, there were many municipal mergers across Norway due to the work of the Schei Committee. On 1 January 1964, Sandstad Municipality (population: 1,028), Fillan Municipality (population: 1,759), Kvenvær Municipality (population: 840), and Hitra Municipality (population: 1,344) were merged to form a new, larger Hitra Municipality.

=== Name ===
The municipality (originally the parish) is named after the old Sandstad farm (Old Norse: Sǫndulfsstaðir). The first element is the old male name Sǫndulfr. The last element is the plural nominative case of staðr which means "place" or "abode".

=== Churches ===
The Church of Norway had one parish (sokn) within Sandstad Municipality. At the time of the municipal dissolution, it was part of the Hitra prestegjeld and the Sør-Fosen prosti (deanery) in the Diocese of Nidaros.

Churches in Sandstad Municipality
Parish (sokn)	Church name	Location of the church	Year built
Sandstad	Sandstad Church	Sandstad	1888

== Geography ==
The municipality was located on the southeastern part of the island of Hitra. It was bordered by Fillan Municipality and Hitra Municipality to the north and Kvenvær Municipality to the north and west. The highest point in the municipality was the 345-metre (1,132 ft) tall mountain Mørkdalstua, on the border with Kvenvær Municipality and Sandstad Municipality.

== Government ==
While it existed, Sandstad Municipality was responsible for primary education (through 10th grade), outpatient health services, senior citizen services, welfare and other social services, zoning, economic development, and municipal roads and utilities. The municipality was governed by a municipal council of directly elected representatives. The mayor was indirectly elected by a vote of the municipal council. The municipality was under the jurisdiction of the Frostating Court of Appeal.

=== Municipal council ===
The municipal council (Herredsstyre) of Sandstad Municipality was made up of 15representatives that were elected to four year terms. The tables below show the historical composition of the council by political party.

Sandstad herredsstyre 1959–1963
Party name (in Norwegian)	Number of representatives
Labour Party (Arbeiderpartiet)	9
Joint List(s) of Non-Socialist Parties (Borgerlige Felleslister)	6
Total number of members:	15

Sandstad herredsstyre 1955–1959
Party name (in Norwegian)	Number of representatives
Labour Party (Arbeiderpartiet)	8
Conservative Party (Høyre)	4
Christian Democratic Party (Kristelig Folkeparti)	1
Joint List(s) of Non-Socialist Parties (Borgerlige Felleslister)	2
Total number of members:	15

Sandstad herredsstyre 1951–1955
Party name (in Norwegian)	Number of representatives
Labour Party (Arbeiderpartiet)	6
Local List(s) (Lokale lister)	6
Total number of members:	12

Sandstad herredsstyre 1947–1951
Party name (in Norwegian)	Number of representatives
Labour Party (Arbeiderpartiet)	6
Local List(s) (Lokale lister)	6
Total number of members:	12

Sandstad herredsstyre 1945–1947
Party name (in Norwegian)	Number of representatives
Labour Party (Arbeiderpartiet)	7
Joint List(s) of Non-Socialist Parties (Borgerlige Felleslister)	5
Total number of members:	12

Sandstad herredsstyre 1937–1941*
Party name (in Norwegian)	Number of representatives
Labour Party (Arbeiderpartiet)	6
Joint List(s) of Non-Socialist Parties (Borgerlige Felleslister)	4
Local List(s) (Lokale lister)	2
Total number of members:	12
Note: Due to the German occupation of Norway during World War II, no elections were held for new municipal councils until after the war ended in 1945.

=== Mayors ===
The mayor (Norwegian: ordfører) of Sandstad Municipality was the political leader of the municipality and the chairperson of the municipal council. Here is a list of people who held this position:

- 1914–1920: Kasper Utsetø (V)
- 1921–1928: Ole Aalmo (H)
- 1929–1934: Nils Strøm (H)
- 1935–1945: John Aalmo (H)
- 1946–1947: Alf Nesset (Ap)
- 1948–1955: John Aalmo (H)
- 1956–1963: Olaf Sivertsen (Ap)

== See also ==
- List of former municipalities of Norway
