= Børøyholmen Lighthouse =

Børøyholmen Lighthouse Børøyholmen fyrstasjon
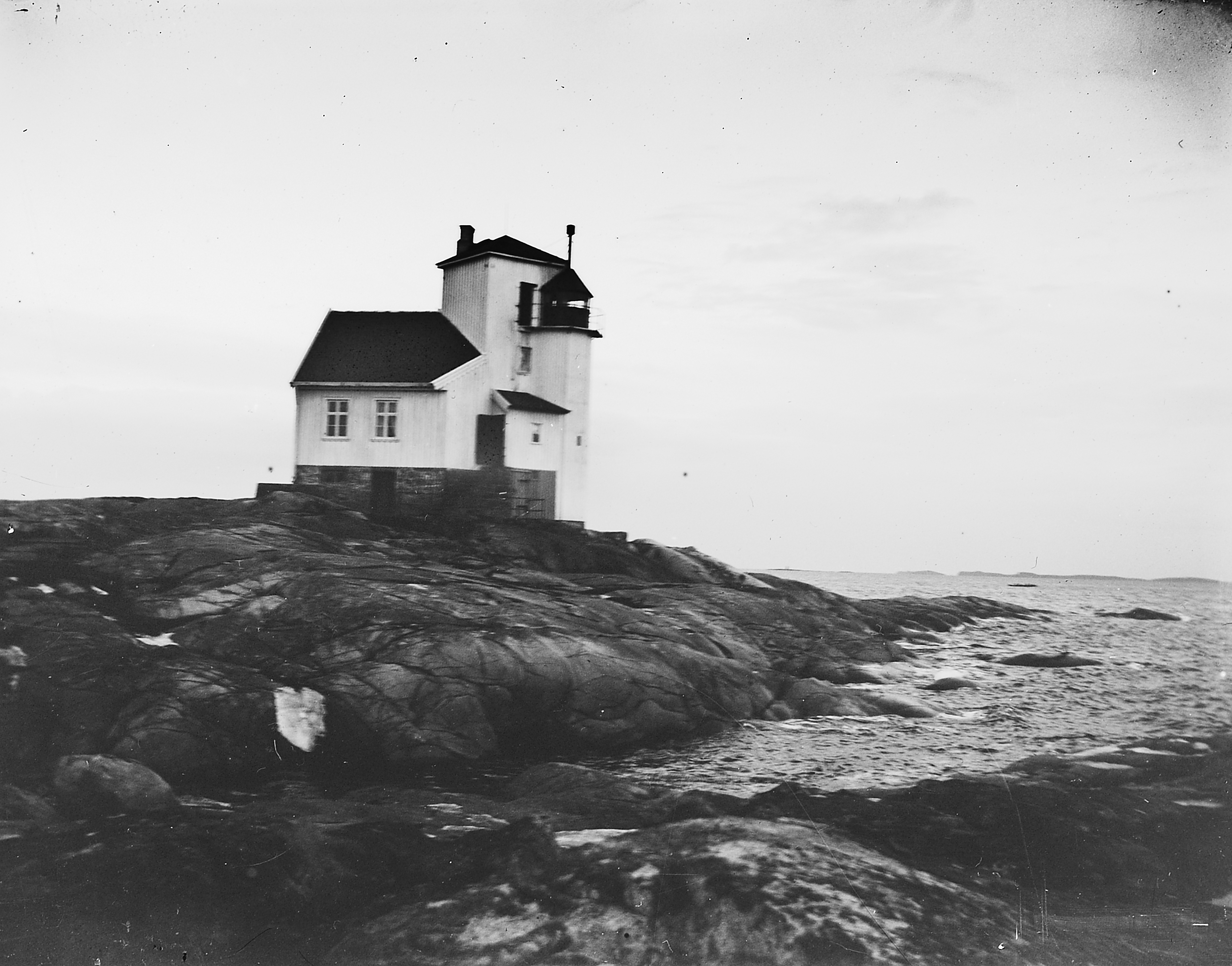
- Børøyholmen Lighthouse in the 1890s
- Location: Hitra Municipality, Norway
- Coordinates: 63°34′19″N 9°13′21″E

Tower
- Constructed: 1874
- Construction: concrete (tower)
- Automated: 1970
- Height: 13 m (43 ft)
- Shape: cylinder
- Markings: White (tower), red (roof)

Light
- First lit: 1970
- Focal height: 13.3 m (44 ft)
- Range: 10.5 nmi (19.4 km; 12.1 mi) (white), 8.1 nmi (15.0 km; 9.3 mi) (red), 7.7 nmi (14.3 km; 8.9 mi) (green)
- Characteristic: Oc WRG 6s
- Norway no.: 409400

Børøyholmen Lighthouse (Norwegian: Børøyholmen fyrstasjon) is a lighthouse in Hitra Municipality in Trøndelag county, Norway. The lighthouse is located in the Trondheimsleia in the entrance to the Kråkvågfjorden on a tiny island off the shore of the village of Hestvika. The light marks the channel into the Trondheimsleia between the island of Hitra and the islands of Leksa.

The 13-metre (43 ft) tall lighthouse is a cylindrical, concrete tower that is painted white and it had a red roof. The light sits at an elevation of 13.3 metres (44 ft) above sea level and it emits a white, red, or green light (depending on direction), occulting once every six seconds. The light can be seen for up to 10.5 nmi (19.4 km; 12.1 mi). The site is only accessible by boat.

== History ==
The original lighthouse was built in 1874 and it was closed in 1970 when the new automated lighthouse was built alongside it. The original lighthouse had a 8-metre (26 ft) tall tower that was attached to a 1 1/2-story lighthouse keeper's house. The house was demolished in 1973, but the tower remains.

== See also ==
- List of lighthouses in Norway
- Lighthouses in Norway
