= Hitra Municipality =

Municipality in Trøndelag, Norway

Hitra Municipality Hitra kommune
- Municipality
- Hitteren herred (historic name)
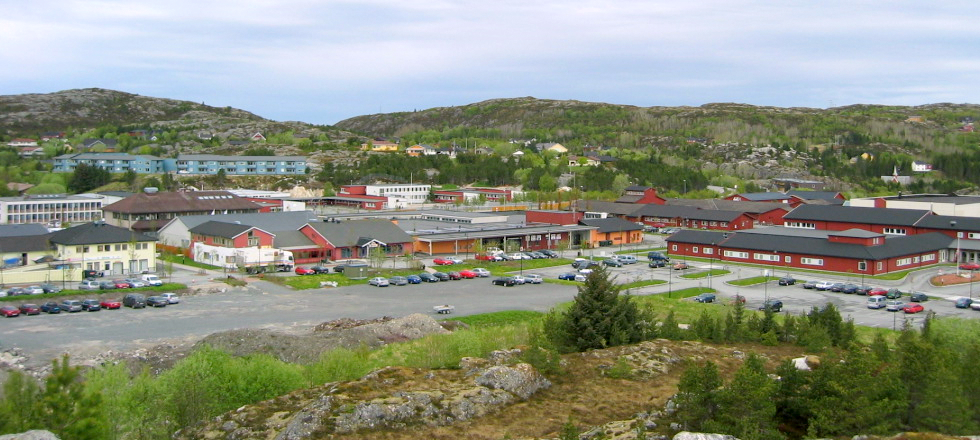
- View of Fillan in Hitra

- Flag Coat of arms

- Trøndelag within Norway

- Hitra within Trøndelag
- Coordinates: 63°32′50″N 08°51′17″E
- Country: Norway
- County: Trøndelag
- District: Fosen
- Established: 1 Jan 1838
  - Created as: Formannskapsdistrikt
- Administrative centre: Fillan

Government
  - Mayor (2023): John Lernes (Ap)

Area
  - Total: 755.89 km^{2} (291.85 sq mi)
  - Land: 715.27 km^{2} (276.17 sq mi)
  - Water: 40.62 km^{2} (15.68 sq mi) 5.4%
  - Rank: #149 in Norway
- Highest elevation: 526.09 m (1,726.0 ft)

Population (2024)
  - Total: 5,323
  - Rank: #178 in Norway
  - Density: 7/km^{2} (18/sq mi)
  - Change (10 years): ▲ +17.7%
- Demonym: Hitterværing

Official language
  - Norwegian form: Neutral
- Time zone: UTC+01:00 (CET)
  - Summer (DST): UTC+02:00 (CEST)
- ISO 3166 code: NO-5056
- Website: Official website

Hitra is a municipality in Trøndelag county, Norway. The municipality covers the island of Hitra and hundreds of smaller islands, islets, and skerries as well as an area on the mainland of Norway. It is part of the Fosen region. The administrative centre of the municipality is the village of Fillan. Other villages include Andersskogan, Ansnes, Forsnes, Hestvika, Knarrlaget, Kvenvær, Melandsjøen, Nordbotn, Sandstad, and Ulvan.

The 756-square-kilometre (292 sq mi) municipality is the 149th largest by area out of the 357 municipalities in Norway. Hitra Municipality is the 178th most populous municipality in Norway with a population of 5,323. The municipality's population density is 7 inhabitants per square kilometre (18/sq mi) and its population has increased by 17.7% over the previous 10-year period.

Hitra Municipality is famous in Norway for its large and dense population of red deer (as symbolised in its coat of arms — see image right). Hitra Municipality is a member of the International Island Games Association.

== General information ==
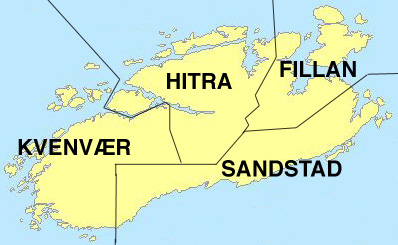
Map of the old municipal borders on the island of Hitra

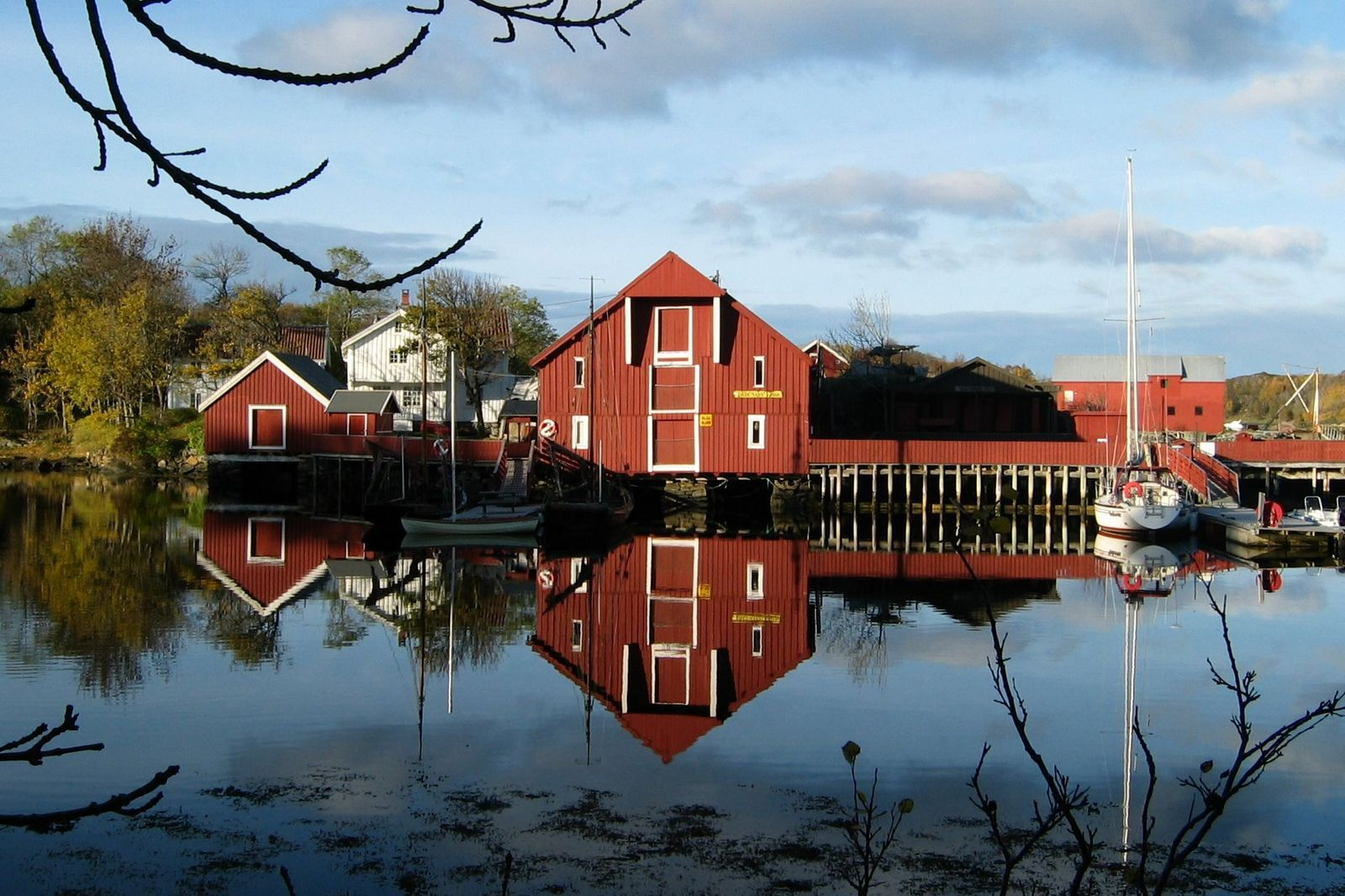
Hopsjøbrygga, Hitra

The prestegjeld of Hitra was established as a municipality on 1 January 1838 (see formannskapsdistrikt law). On 1 January 1877, the northern island of Frøya and its smaller surrounding islets (population: 3,949) was separated from Hitra to form the new Frøya Municipality. On 1 January 1886, the southern and eastern parts of Hitra Municipality were separated into a new Fillan Municipality. This left Hitra Municipality with 2,241 residents. Then on 1 January 1913, the western part of Hitra Municipality was separated to form the new Kvenvær Municipality. This left Hitra Municipality with 1,439 residents.

During the 1960s, there were many municipal mergers across Norway due to the work of the Schei Committee. On 1 January 1964, Hitra Municipality (population: 1,344), Kvenvær Municipality (population: 840), Fillan Municipality (population: 1,759), and Sandstad Municipality (population: 1,028) were merged to form a new, larger Hitra Municipality.

On 1 January 2018, the municipality switched from the old Sør-Trøndelag county to the new Trøndelag county.

On 1 January 2020, the island of Hemnskjela and the northwestern corner of Snillfjord Municipality on the mainland was merged into Hitra Municipality.

=== Name ===
The municipality (originally the parish) is named after the island of Hitra (Old Norse: Hitr). The name is probably derived from a word meaning "split" or "cleft" (referring to the many inlets of the island). Historically, the name of the municipality was spelled Hitteren. On 3 November 1917, a royal resolution changed the spelling of the name of the municipality to Hitra.

=== Coat of arms ===
The coat of arms was granted on 7 August 1987. The official blazon is "Azure, a stag's head couped argent" (Norwegian: I blått et sølv hjortehode). This means the arms have a blue field (background) and the charge is the head of a stag. The stag's head has a tincture of argent which means it is commonly colored white, but if it is made out of metal, then silver is used. The blue color in the field symbolizes the importance of the sea for the island municipality. The design of the stag's head symbolizes that Hitra is home to one of Northern Europe's largest populations of red deer. The arms were based on an idea by Ketil Gylland from Fillan and drawn by the designer Einar Skjervold from Trondheim.

=== Churches ===
The Church of Norway has two parishes (sokn) within Hitra Municipality. It is part of the Orkdal prosti (deanery) in the Diocese of Nidaros.

Churches in Hitra Municipality
Parish (sokn)	Church name	Location of the church	Year built
Hitra og Fillan	Hitra Church	Melandsjøen	1927
Hitra og Fillan	Dolm Church	Dolmøya	1188
Hitra og Fillan	Fillan Church	Fillan	1789
Hitra og Fillan	Nordbotn Church	Nordbotn	1900
Kvenvær og Sandstad	Kvenvær Church	Kvenvær	1909
Kvenvær og Sandstad	Forsnes Chapel	Forsnes	1935
Kvenvær og Sandstad	Sandstad Church	Sandstad	1888

== Government ==
Hitra Municipality is responsible for primary education (through 10th grade), outpatient health services, senior citizen services, welfare and other social services, zoning, economic development, and municipal roads and utilities. The municipality is governed by a municipal council of directly elected representatives. The mayor is indirectly elected by a vote of the municipal council. The municipality is under the jurisdiction of the Trøndelag District Court and the Frostating Court of Appeal. Waste management was from 2006 handled by the inter-municipal agency HAMOS Forvaltning. It merged into ReMidt in 2020.

=== Municipal council ===
The municipal council (Kommunestyre) of Hitra Municipality is made up of 25 representatives that are elected to four year terms. The tables below show the current and historical composition of the council by political party.

Hitra kommunestyre 2023–2027
Party name (in Norwegian)	Number of representatives
Labour Party (Arbeiderpartiet)	9
Progress Party (Fremskrittspartiet)	3
Conservative Party (Høyre)	7
Pensioners' Party (Pensjonistpartiet)	2
Red Party (Rødt)	2
Centre Party (Senterpartiet)	1
Socialist Left Party (Sosialistisk Venstreparti)	1
Total number of members:	25

Hitra kommunestyre 2019–2023
Party name (in Norwegian)	Number of representatives
Labour Party (Arbeiderpartiet)	9
Progress Party (Fremskrittspartiet)	2
Conservative Party (Høyre)	3
Pensioners' Party (Pensjonistpartiet)	4
Red Party (Rødt)	2
Centre Party (Senterpartiet)	3
Socialist Left Party (Sosialistisk Venstreparti)	1
Liberal Party (Venstre)	1
Total number of members:	25

Hitra kommunestyre 2015–2019
Party name (in Norwegian)	Number of representatives
Labour Party (Arbeiderpartiet)	9
Progress Party (Fremskrittspartiet)	2
Green Party (Miljøpartiet De Grønne)	1
Conservative Party (Høyre)	2
Christian Democratic Party (Kristelig Folkeparti)	1
Pensioners' Party (Pensjonistpartiet)	4
Centre Party (Senterpartiet)	2
Socialist Left Party (Sosialistisk Venstreparti)	1
Liberal Party (Venstre)	1
Total number of members:	23

Hitra kommunestyre 2011–2015
Party name (in Norwegian)	Number of representatives
Labour Party (Arbeiderpartiet)	9
Progress Party (Fremskrittspartiet)	3
Conservative Party (Høyre)	3
Christian Democratic Party (Kristelig Folkeparti)	1
Pensioners' Party (Pensjonistpartiet)	4
Centre Party (Senterpartiet)	1
Socialist Left Party (Sosialistisk Venstreparti)	1
Liberal Party (Venstre)	1
Total number of members:	23

Hitra kommunestyre 2007–2011
Party name (in Norwegian)	Number of representatives
Labour Party (Arbeiderpartiet)	8
Progress Party (Fremskrittspartiet)	7
Conservative Party (Høyre)	3
Christian Democratic Party (Kristelig Folkeparti)	1
Centre Party (Senterpartiet)	2
Socialist Left Party (Sosialistisk Venstreparti)	2
Total number of members:	23

Hitra kommunestyre 2003–2007
Party name (in Norwegian)	Number of representatives
Labour Party (Arbeiderpartiet)	6
Progress Party (Fremskrittspartiet)	6
Conservative Party (Høyre)	5
Christian Democratic Party (Kristelig Folkeparti)	1
Centre Party (Senterpartiet)	2
Socialist Left Party (Sosialistisk Venstreparti)	3
Total number of members:	23

Hitra kommunestyre 1999–2003
Party name (in Norwegian)	Number of representatives
Labour Party (Arbeiderpartiet)	6
Progress Party (Fremskrittspartiet)	3
Green Party (Miljøpartiet De Grønne)	1
Conservative Party (Høyre)	7
Christian Democratic Party (Kristelig Folkeparti)	2
Centre Party (Senterpartiet)	3
Liberal Party (Venstre)	1
Total number of members:	23

Hitra kommunestyre 1995–1999
Party name (in Norwegian)	Number of representatives
Labour Party (Arbeiderpartiet)	6
Progress Party (Fremskrittspartiet)	2
Conservative Party (Høyre)	7
Christian Democratic Party (Kristelig Folkeparti)	2
Centre Party (Senterpartiet)	5
Socialist Left Party (Sosialistisk Venstreparti)	1
Total number of members:	23

Hitra kommunestyre 1991–1995
Party name (in Norwegian)	Number of representatives
Labour Party (Arbeiderpartiet)	6
Progress Party (Fremskrittspartiet)	1
Conservative Party (Høyre)	7
Christian Democratic Party (Kristelig Folkeparti)	2
Centre Party (Senterpartiet)	4
Socialist Left Party (Sosialistisk Venstreparti)	3
Total number of members:	23

Hitra kommunestyre 1987–1991
Party name (in Norwegian)	Number of representatives
Labour Party (Arbeiderpartiet)	10
Progress Party (Fremskrittspartiet)	1
Conservative Party (Høyre)	7
Christian Democratic Party (Kristelig Folkeparti)	2
Red Electoral Alliance (Rød Valgallianse)	1
Centre Party (Senterpartiet)	4
Socialist Left Party (Sosialistisk Venstreparti)	2
Non-party list for Fjellværøy/Ulvøy (Upolitisk liste for Fjellværøy/Ulvøy)	2
Total number of members:	29

Hitra kommunestyre 1983–1987
Party name (in Norwegian)	Number of representatives
Labour Party (Arbeiderpartiet)	9
Progress Party (Fremskrittspartiet)	1
Conservative Party (Høyre)	5
Christian Democratic Party (Kristelig Folkeparti)	3
Red Electoral Alliance (Rød Valgallianse)	1
Centre Party (Senterpartiet)	4
Socialist Left Party (Sosialistisk Venstreparti)	1
Hitra non-party list (Hitra upolitiske liste)	2
Non-party list for Fjellværøy/Ulvøy (Upolitisk liste for Fjellværøy/U1vøy)	3
Total number of members:	29

Hitra kommunestyre 1979–1983
Party name (in Norwegian)	Number of representatives
Labour Party (Arbeiderpartiet)	9
Conservative Party (Høyre)	8
Christian Democratic Party (Kristelig Folkeparti)	3
Centre Party (Senterpartiet)	4
Socialist Left Party (Sosialistisk Venstreparti)	2
Liberal Party (Venstre)	1
Non-party list (Upolitisk liste)	2
Total number of members:	29

Hitra kommunestyre 1975–1979
Party name (in Norwegian)	Number of representatives
Labour Party (Arbeiderpartiet)	8
Conservative Party (Høyre)	7
Christian Democratic Party (Kristelig Folkeparti)	4
Centre Party (Senterpartiet)	5
Socialist Left Party (Sosialistisk Venstreparti)	2
Liberal Party (Venstre)	1
Non-party list (Upolitisk Liste)	1
Total number of members:	29

Hitra kommunestyre 1971–1975
Party name (in Norwegian)	Number of representatives
Labour Party (Arbeiderpartiet)	11
Conservative Party (Høyre)	4
Christian Democratic Party (Kristelig Folkeparti)	3
Centre Party (Senterpartiet)	6
Socialist People's Party (Sosialistisk Folkeparti)	1
Liberal Party (Venstre)	1
Joint List(s) of Non-Socialist Parties (Borgerlige Felleslister)	2
Local List(s) (Lokale lister)	1
Total number of members:	29

Hitra kommunestyre 1967–1971
Party name (in Norwegian)	Number of representatives
Labour Party (Arbeiderpartiet)	13
Conservative Party (Høyre)	8
Christian Democratic Party (Kristelig Folkeparti)	5
Socialist People's Party (Sosialistisk Folkeparti)	1
Joint List(s) of Non-Socialist Parties (Borgerlige Felleslister)	8
Local List(s) (Lokale lister)	2
Total number of members:	37

Hitra kommunestyre 1963–1967
Party name (in Norwegian)	Number of representatives
Labour Party (Arbeiderpartiet)	14
Joint List(s) of Non-Socialist Parties (Borgerlige Felleslister)	20
Local List(s) (Lokale lister)	3
Total number of members:	37

Hitra herredsstyre 1959–1963
Party name (in Norwegian)	Number of representatives
Labour Party (Arbeiderpartiet)	2
Local List(s) (Lokale lister)	15
Total number of members:	17

Hitra herredsstyre 1955–1959
Party name (in Norwegian)	Number of representatives
Labour Party (Arbeiderpartiet)	4
Liberal Party (Venstre)	1
Local List(s) (Lokale lister)	12
Total number of members:	17

Hitra herredsstyre 1951–1955
Party name (in Norwegian)	Number of representatives
Labour Party (Arbeiderpartiet)	3
Liberal Party (Venstre)	1
Joint List(s) of Non-Socialist Parties (Borgerlige Felleslister)	6
Local List(s) (Lokale lister)	6
Total number of members:	16

Hitra herredsstyre 1947–1951
Party name (in Norwegian)	Number of representatives
Labour Party (Arbeiderpartiet)	4
Joint List(s) of Non-Socialist Parties (Borgerlige Felleslister)	8
Local List(s) (Lokale lister)	4
Total number of members:	16

Hitra herredsstyre 1945–1947
Party name (in Norwegian)	Number of representatives
Labour Party (Arbeiderpartiet)	8
Local List(s) (Lokale lister)	8
Total number of members:	16

Hitra herredsstyre 1937–1941*
Party name (in Norwegian)	Number of representatives
Labour Party (Arbeiderpartiet)	4
List of workers, fishermen, and small farmholders (Arbeidere, fiskere, småbrukere liste)	1
Joint List(s) of Non-Socialist Parties (Borgerlige Felleslister)	3
Hitra Voters' Association (Hitra Velgerforening)	8
Total number of members:	16
Note: Due to the German occupation of Norway during World War II, no elections were held for new municipal councils until after the war ended in 1945.

=== Mayors ===
The mayor (Norwegian: ordfører) of Hitra Municipality is the political leader of the municipality and the chairperson of the municipal council. Here is a list of people who have held this position (incomplete list):

- 1838–1840: Johan Jørgen Borten
- 1840–1843: Rev. Christian Johannes Brodtkorb
- 1844–1845: Mr. Morch
- 1846–1847: Rev. Christian Meyer
- 1848–1853: Unknown
- 1854–1856: Rev. Mathias Heltberg
- 1857–1857: Erik Sveberg
- 1858–1859: Ellef Aret
- 1860–1861: Mr. Akset
- 1862–1869: Martin Nicolai Brodtkorb
- 1870–1871: Unknown
- 1871–1872: N. Schei
- 1873–1875: Unknown
- 1876–1885: Christoffer Lossius Strøm
- 1885–1887: John Holm
- 1888–1891: Nils Kristian Jørstad
- 1892–1901: Hans Fredrik Strøm
- 1901–1903: Knud Sverkli
- 1903–1913: Hans Olsen Melandsø (V)
- 1914–1916: Jonas Strøm
- 1917–1919: Hans Olsen Melandsø (V)
- 1920–1922: Fredrik H. Strøm (Bp)
- 1922–1925: Morten Lossius (V)
- 1926–1931: Fredrik H. Strøm (Bp)
- 1931–1934: Johan Olaus Asmundvaag (H)
- 1935–1940: Ludvig Smaage (V)
- 1941–1942: Morten Lossius (V)
- 1942–1945: Sigbjørn Årnes (NS)
- 1945–1945: Ludvig Smaage (V)
- 1946–1947: Sten Hamnes (Ap)
- 1948–1955: Ludvig Smaage (V)
- 1956–1959: Peder Roksvåg (Ap)
- 1960–1963: Jakob Storvik (LL)
- 1964–1967: Arne Schanche Nilsen (Sp)
- 1968–1971: Isak Hegerberg (H)
- 1972–1975: Arne Schanche Nilsen (Sp)
- 1976–1981: Isak Hegerberg (H)
- 1982–1983: Bergljot Stokkan (Sp)
- 1984–1987: Helge Jektvik (Ap)
- 1988–1999: Egil Hestnes (H)
- 1999–2003: Sigmund Jessen (Ap)
- 2003–2007: Egil Hestnes (H)
- 2007–2023: Ole Haugen (Ap)
- 2023–present: John Lernes (Ap)

== Geography ==
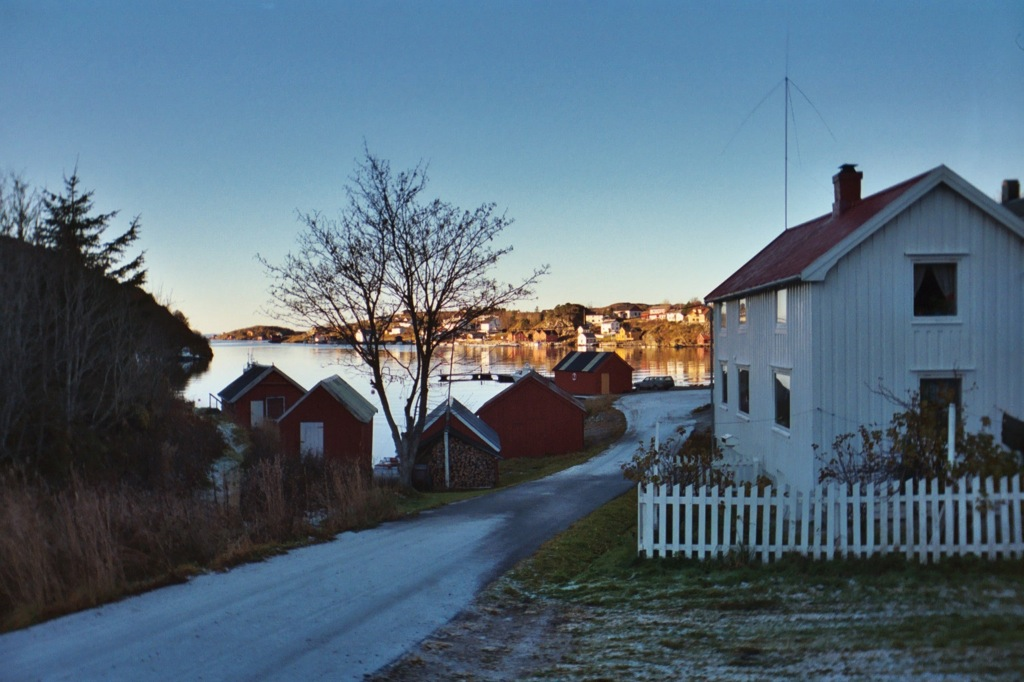
View of Hitra

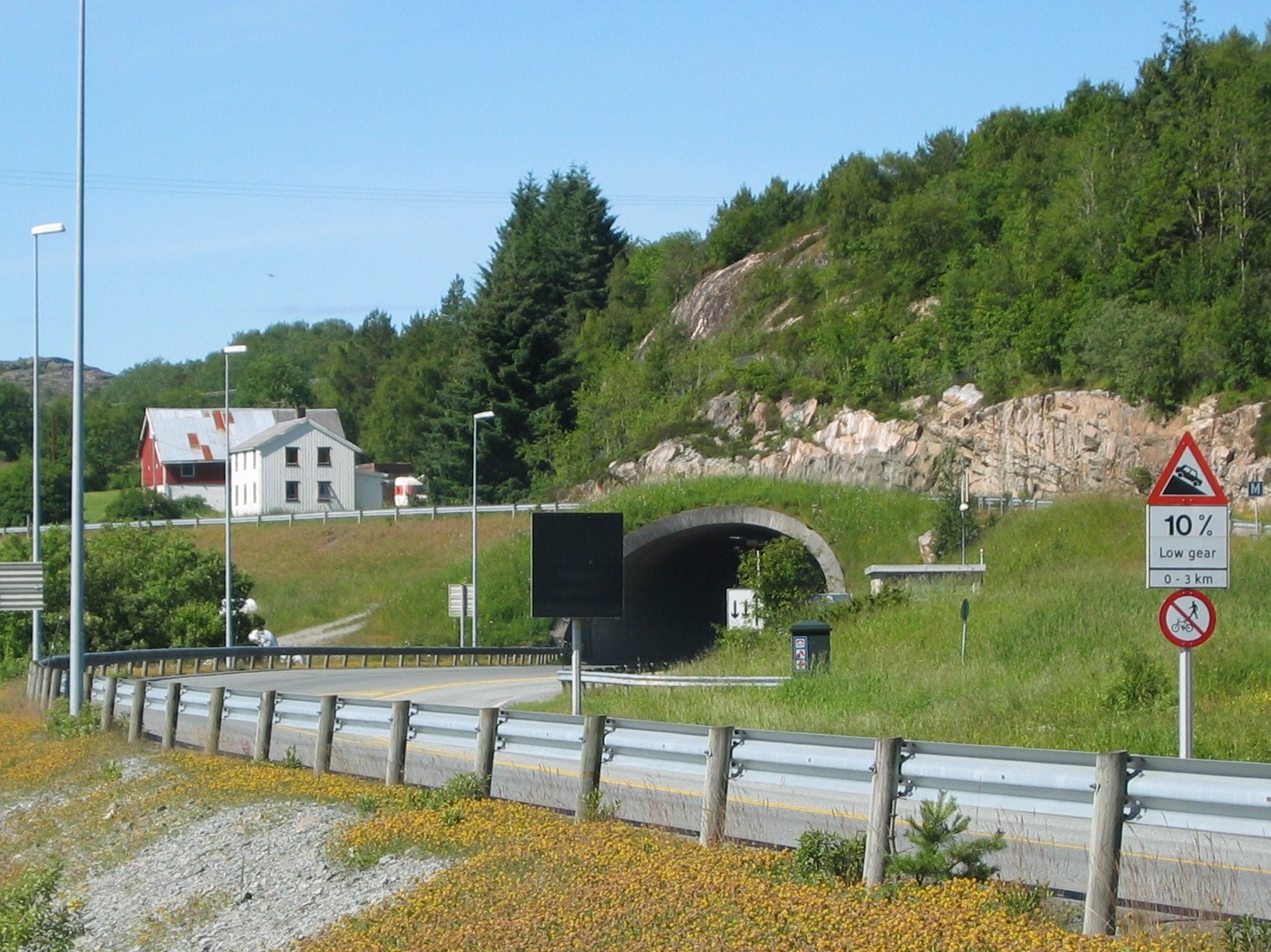
Entrance to the Hitra Tunnel

Hitra is the seventh largest island of mainland Norway. It is bordered by Frøya Municipality to the north and to the south (on the mainland) are Heim Municipality and Orkland Municipality. It lies between the Trondheimsleia strait and the Frøyfjorden. The 345-metre (1,132 ft) tall Mørkdalstuva is the highest point on the island of Hitra. The highest point in the whole municipality is the 526.9-metre (1,729 ft) tall mountain Vingfjellet on the mainland, on the border with Orkland Municipality.

Other than the large island of Hitra, there are many other islands in the municipality, notably Fjellværsøya, Ulvøya, Dolmøya, Helgbustadøya, Hemnskjela, and Bispøyan. The Børøyholmen Lighthouse and Terningen Lighthouse are located in the Trondheimsleia in the southeast part of Hitra Municipality.

== Transportation ==
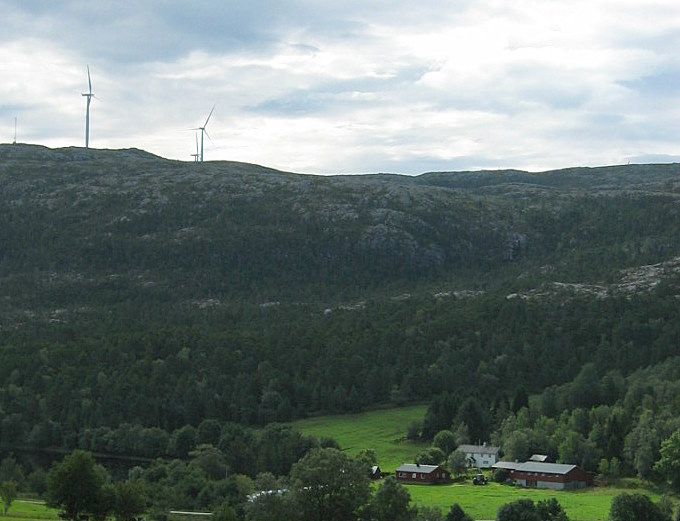
Hitra landscape with wind turbines, near Straum

The company Kystekspressen runs westamaran services from Trondheim and Kristiansund. The 5,610-metre (3.5 mi) long undersea tunnel called the Hitratunnelen connects the island of Hitra to the mainland to the south and the 5,305-metre (3.3 mi) long Frøya Tunnel connects Hitra to the neighboring island of Frøya to the north.

== Energy ==
There is a wind farm in the central part of the island, Hitra Wind Farm, founded in 2004, which has 24 wind turbines which produce a total of 55 megawatts (74,000 hp).

== Notable people ==
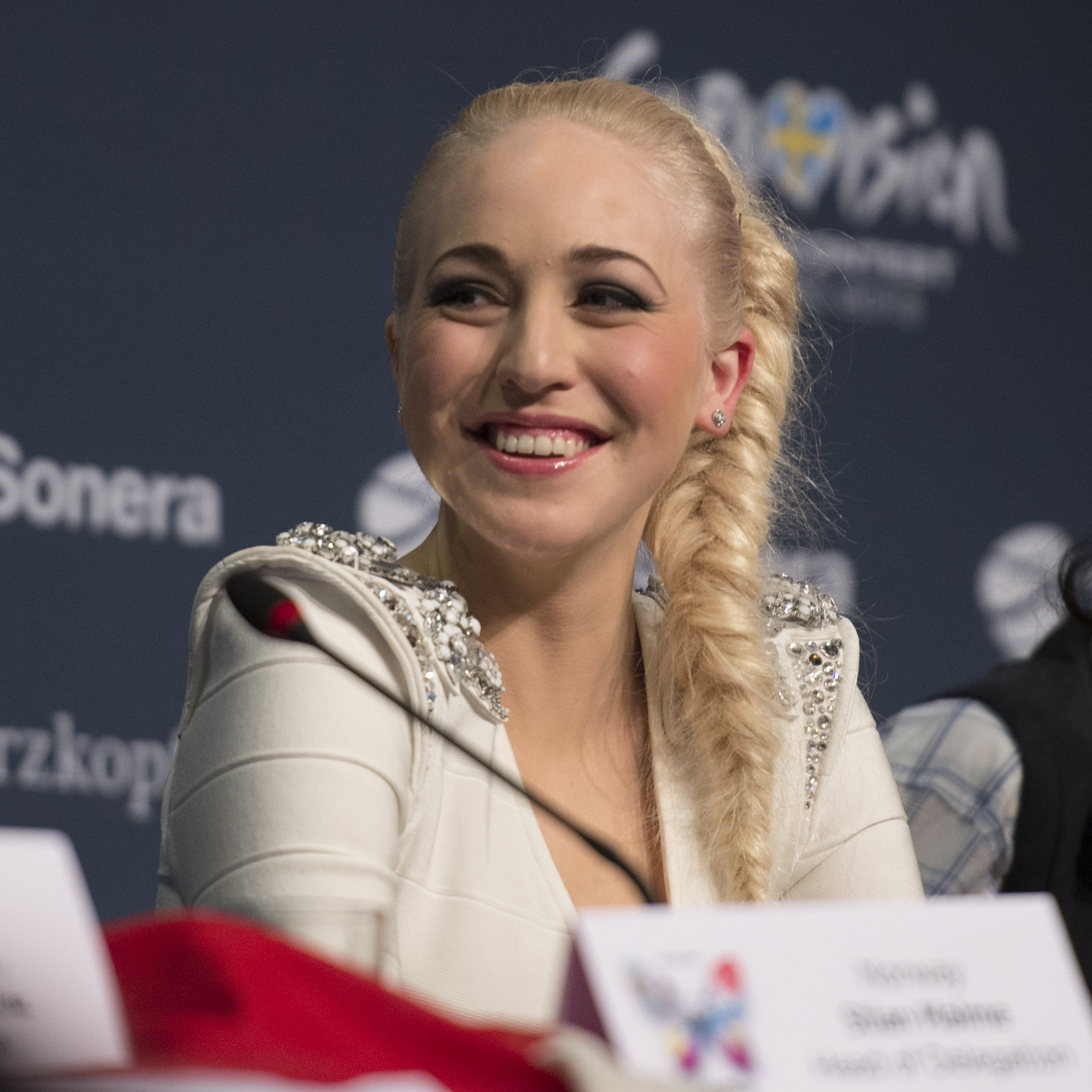
Margaret Berger, 2013

- Simon Michelet (1863–1942), a theologian, teacher, and academic who was brought up in Hitra
- John Aalmo (1902–1981), a Norwegian politician and Mayor of Sandstad Municipality from 1934 to 1957 (except 1946–1947)
- Martin Skaaren (1905 in Hitra – 1999), a Norwegian politician and Mayor of Kvenvær Municipality from 1945 to 1961
- Kjerstin Øvrelid (1929 in Hitra – 1989), a painter of flowers and the sea and skerries
- Knut Børø (born 1948 in Hitra), a retired 5,000- and 10,000-metre runner who competed in the 1972 and 1976 Summer Olympics
- Rita Ottervik (born 1966 in Hitra), a Norwegian politician and Mayor of Trondheim from 2003 to 2023
- Anders Jektvik (born 1982 in Hitra), a musician, singer, songwriter, and guitarist
- Margaret Berger (born 1985), a singer, songwriter, music director, and DJ who was brought up in Hitra

== See also ==
- Hitra official football team
