= Hitra Church =

Church in Trøndelag, Norway

- Hitra kirke
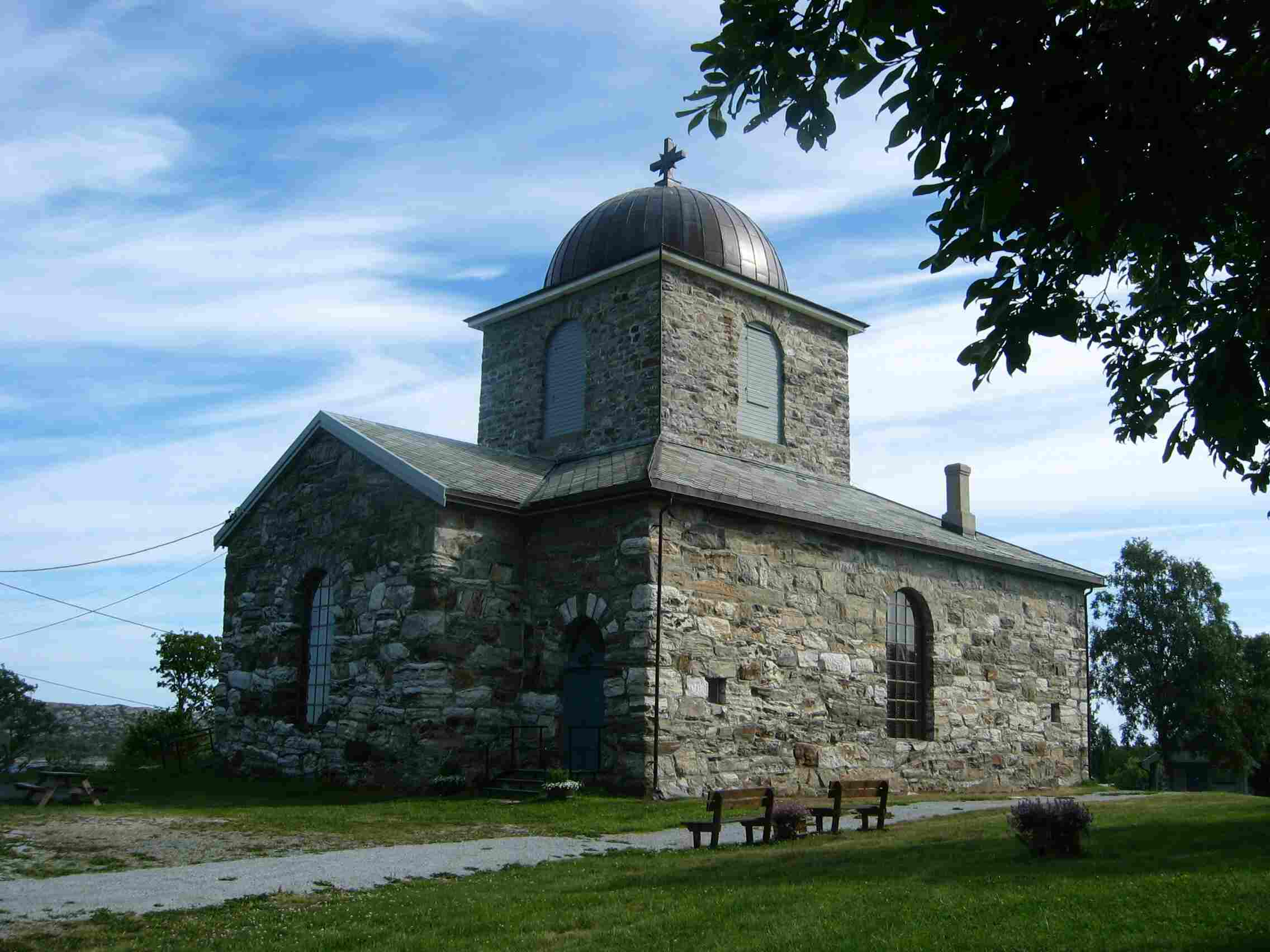
- View of the church
- Hitra Church
- 63.6285930276°N 08.7267861579°E
- Location: Hitra Municipality, Trøndelag
- Country: Norway
- Denomination: Church of Norway
- Churchmanship: Evangelical Lutheran

History
- Status: Parish church
- Founded: 1927
- Consecrated: 15 Dec 1927

Architecture
- Functional status: Active
- Architect: Claus Hjelte
- Architectural type: Cruciform
- Completed: 1927 (99 years ago)

Specifications
- Capacity: 400
- Materials: Stone

Administration
- Diocese: Nidaros bispedømme
- Deanery: Orkdal prosti
- Parish: Hitra og Fillan
- Norwegian Cultural Heritage Site
- Type: Church
- Status: Listed
- ID: 84579

Hitra Church (Norwegian: Hitra kirke) is a parish church of the Church of Norway in Hitra Municipality in Trøndelag county, Norway. It is located in the village of Melandsjøen on the north shore of the island of Hitra. It is one of the churches for the Hitra og Fillan parish which is part of the Orkdal prosti (deanery) in the Diocese of Nidaros. The square-shaped, stone church was built in a cruciform style in 1927 using plans drawn up by the architect Claus Hjelte (1884-1969). The church seats about 400 people.

== History ==
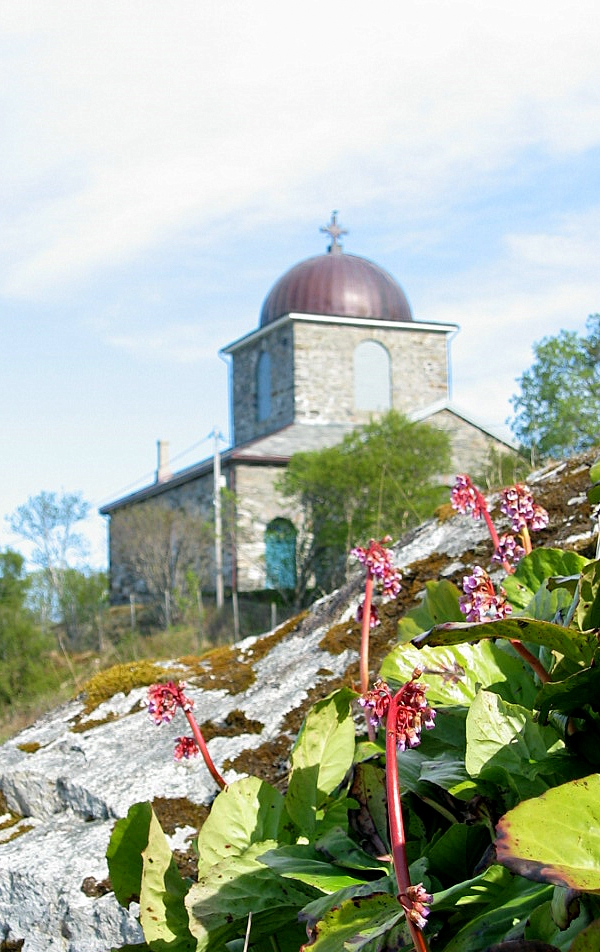
View of the church

The medieval Dolm Church served the parish of Hitra for nearly 800 years before it burned down on the night of 3 February 1920. Seven days after the fire, the parish decided that the church would be rebuilt about 1 kilometre (0.62 mi) away on the other side of the Dolmsundet strait in the village of Melandsjøen. This would make it more accessible to the congregation since it was going to be the main church for the parish. The old Dolm Church was located on the island of Dolmøya and Melandsjøen was on the nearby (larger) island of Hitra where the majority of the people lived.

The new church would be built on the site of a cemetery that had been built in Melandsjøen in 1904. This change was not without controversy, but the parish agreed that the old Dolm Church would be rebuilt and maintained as an annex church in the parish, rather than just being torn down.

The new church was designed by the architect Claus Hjelte and built in 1927. The new church is actually built in a cruciform design, but four other rooms were built on each side of the cross-shaped nave giving the building a nearly square shape. The building was constructed out of local stone. The central part of the nave has a higher ceiling height than the rest of the building and there is a copper Byzantine-style dome with a cross spire on the top. The church was consecrated on 15 December 1927.

== See also ==
- List of churches in Nidaros
