= Hestvika =

Village in Hitra Municipality, Norway

- Village
- Interactive map of Hestvika
- Location within Trøndelag Location within Norway
- Coordinates: 63.5667°N 09.1958°E
- Country: Norway
- Region: Central Norway
- County: Trøndelag
- District: Fosen
- Municipality: Hitra Municipality

Area
  - Total: 0.36 km^{2} (0.14 sq mi)
- Elevation: 15 m (49 ft)

Population (2024)
  - Total: 278
  - Density: 772/km^{2} (2,000/sq mi)
- Time zone: UTC+01:00 (CET)
  - Summer (DST): UTC+02:00 (CEST)
- Post Code: 7247 Hestvika

Hestvika is a village in Hitra Municipality in Trøndelag county, Norway. The village is located on the eastern tip of the island of Hitra along the Trondheimsleia, about 6 kilometres (3.7 mi) east of the village of Sandstad where the entrance to the Hitra Tunnel is located.

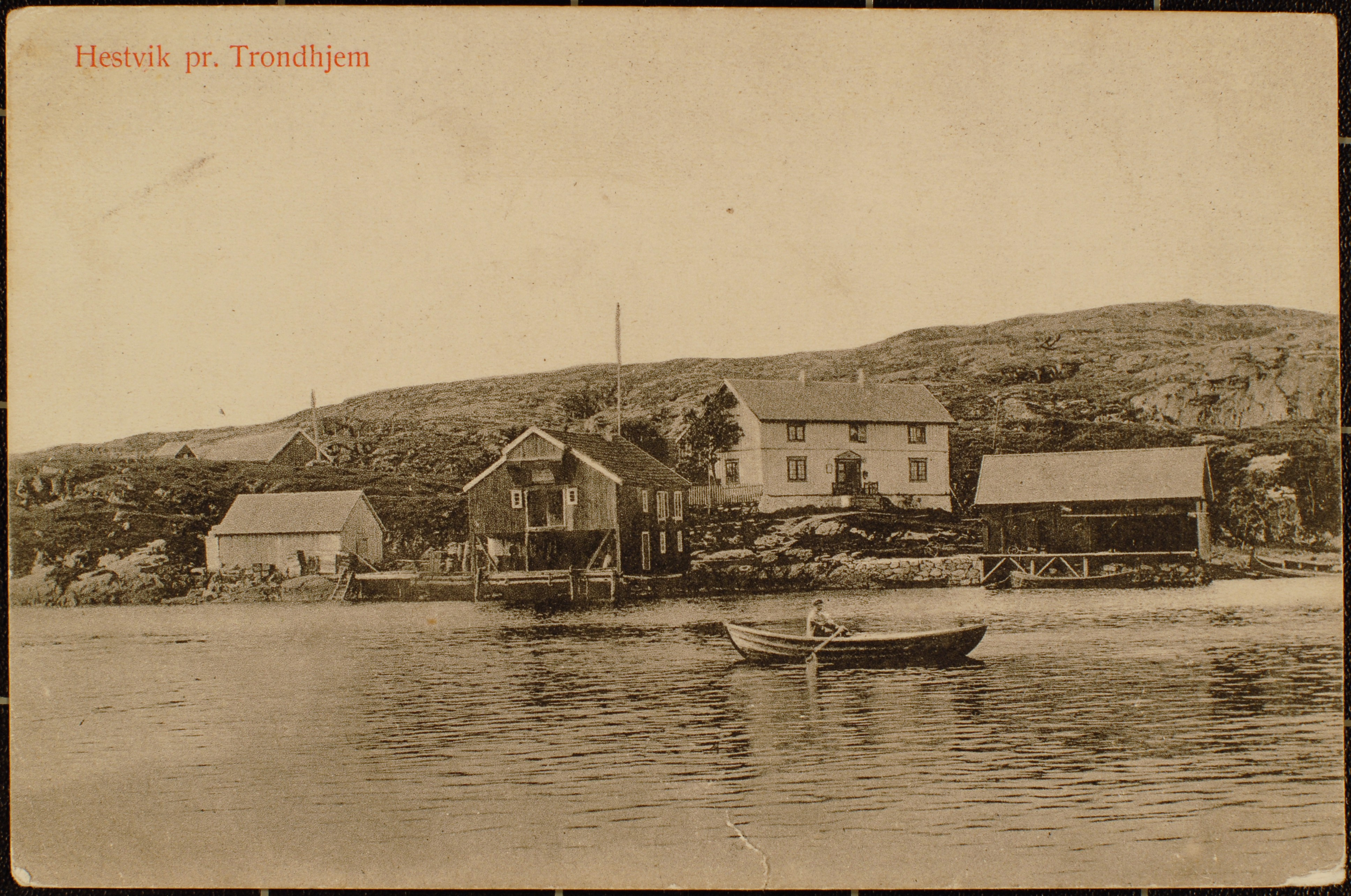
View of Hestvika (c. 1909)

The 0.36-square-kilometre (89-acre) village has a population (2024) of 278 and a population density of 772 inhabitants per square kilometre (2,000/sq mi).

Hestvika has a marina suitable for light watercraft. The Børøyholmen Lighthouse lies about 1.5 kilometres (0.93 mi) to the northeast of the marina. The fishing village has various industries including fish processing.
