= Hitra Tunnel =

Road tunnel in Trøndelag, Norway

Hitra Tunnel Hitratunnelen
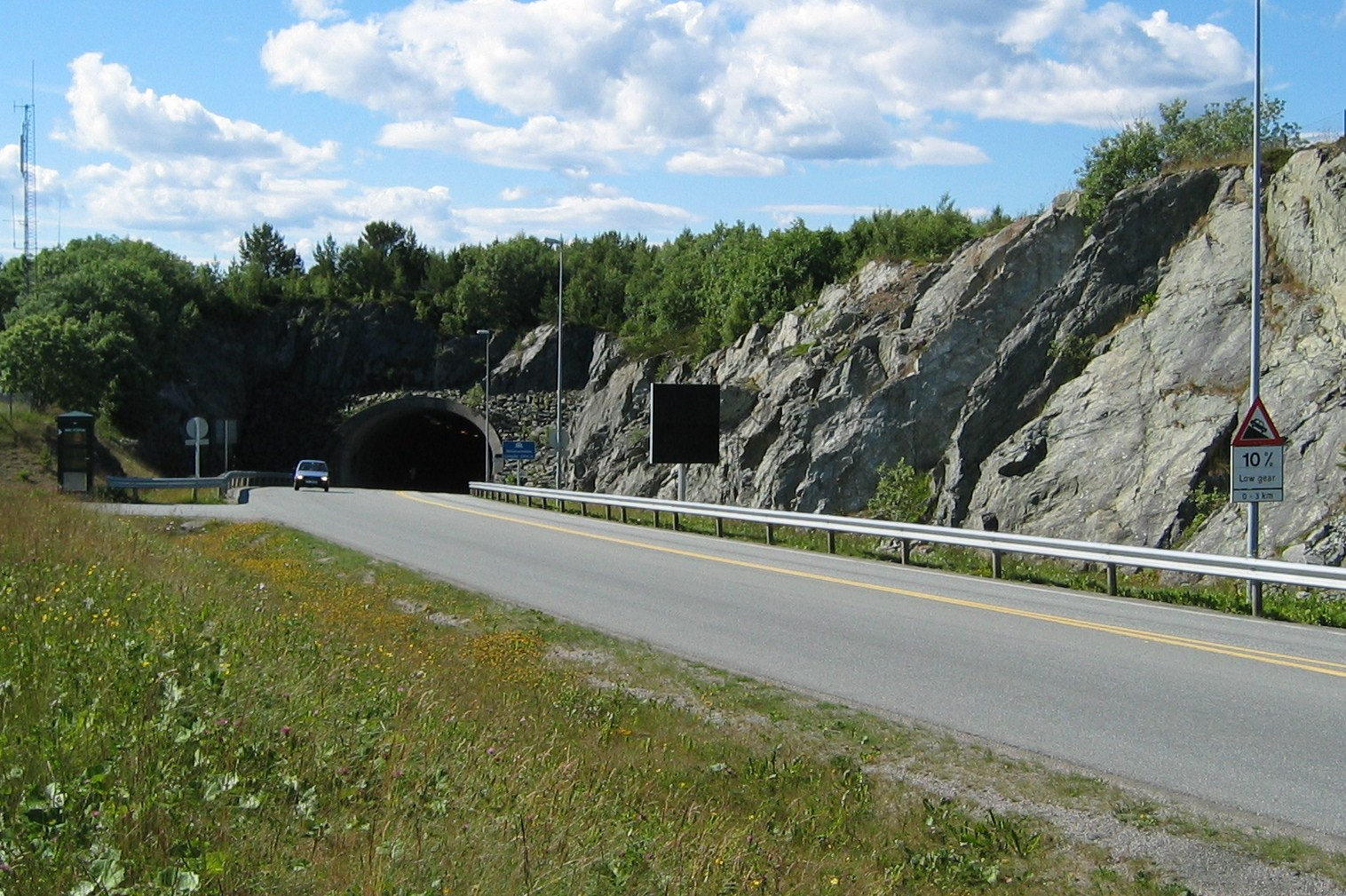
- View of the north entrance to the tunnel
- Interactive map of Hitra Tunnel; Hitratunnelen

Overview
- Location: Trøndelag, Norway
- Coordinates: 63.5010°N 9.0974°E
- Status: In use
- Route: Fv714
- Start: Hemnskjela
- End: Jøsnøya

Operation
- Opened: 8 December 1994
- Operator: Statens vegvesen
- Traffic: Automotive

Technical
- Length: 5,645 metres (18,520 ft)
- No. of lanes: 3
- Min elevation: −264 metres (−866 ft)
- Grade: 10%

The Hitra Tunnel (Norwegian: Hitratunnelen) is an undersea tunnel in Hitra Municipality in Trøndelag county, Norway. The tunnel connects the island of Hitra to the mainland. The tunnel is 5,645 metres (18,520 ft) long and reaches a depth of 264 metres (866 ft) below sea level, making it the deepest tunnel in the world when it was built, overtaking the Seikan Tunnel.

The tunnel begins on the island of Jøsnøya, just south of the village of Sandstad. The tunnel then runs under the Trondheimsleia to the island of Hemnskjela. There is a small bridge connecting Hemnskjela to the mainland. The tunnel was built as part of a large project called "Fastlandsforbindelsen Hitra–Frøya". The project also included the construction of the Frøya Tunnel and the construction of a road and bridge network connecting the islands of Fjellværøy and Frøya.

The tunnel has three lanes. Nearly 2,500 cars pass through it every day. Electronics and pumps handle over 38,000 litres (8,400 imp gal; 10,000 US gal) of water per hour.

== Media gallery ==
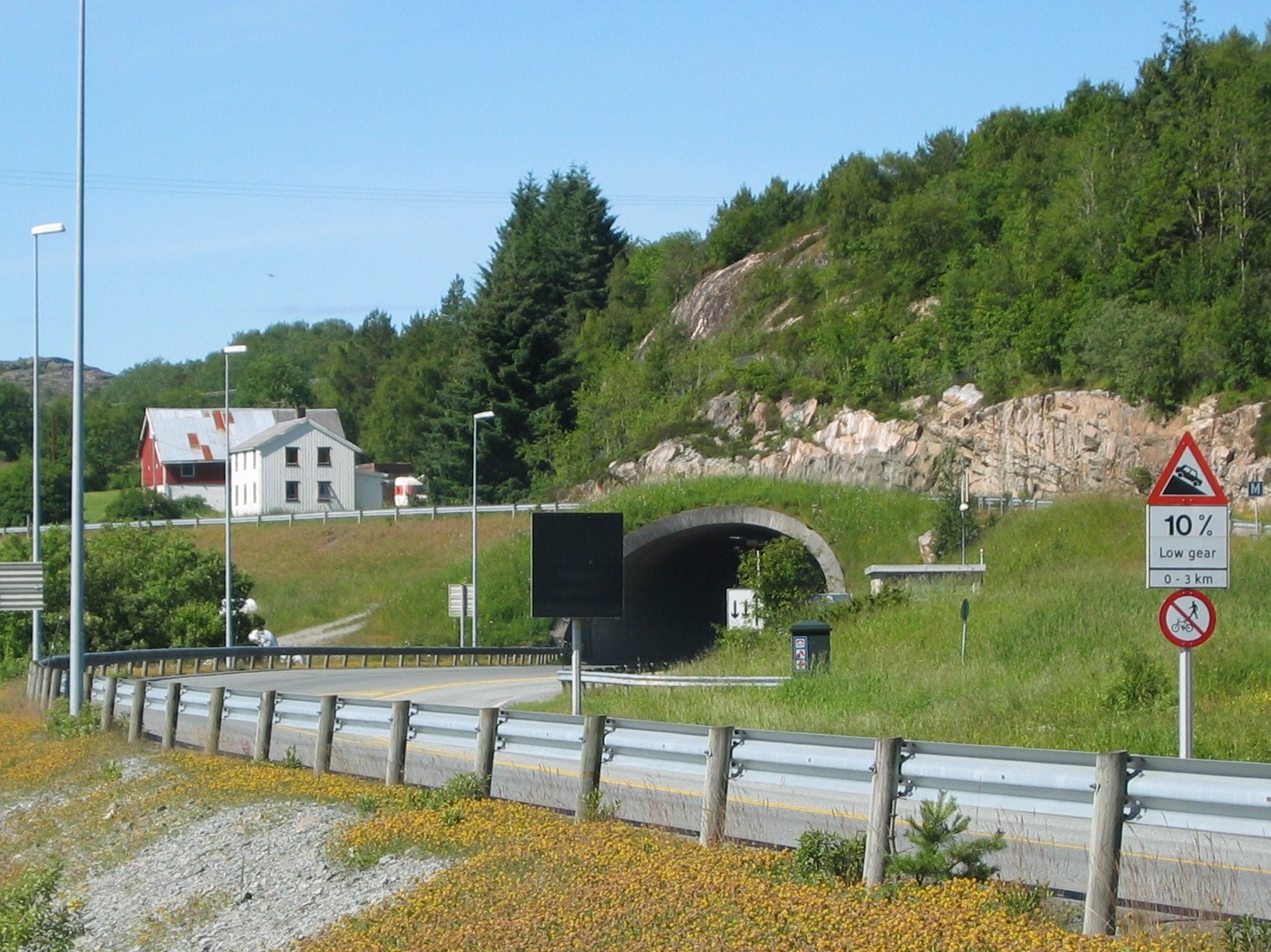
View of the south end of the tunnel

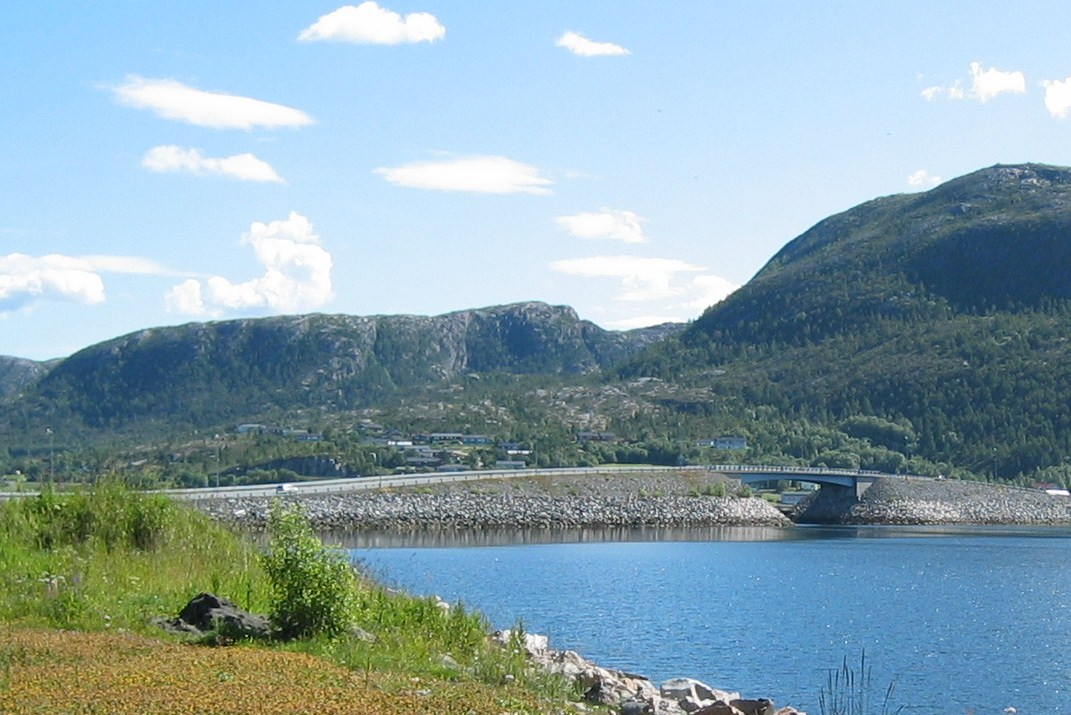
View of the bridge connecting Hemnskjela to the mainland
