= Kvenvær Municipality =

Former municipality in Trøndelag, Norway

Kvenvær Municipality Kvenvær herred
- Former municipality
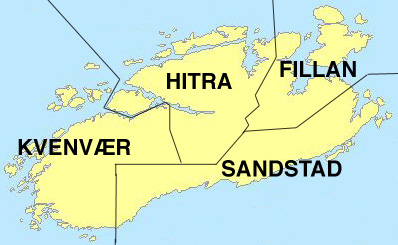
- Map of the old municipalities on the island of Hitra

- Sør-Trøndelag within Norway

- Kvenvær within Sør-Trøndelag
- Coordinates: 63.5325°N 08.3912°E
- Country: Norway
- County: Sør-Trøndelag
- District: Fosen
- Established: 1 Jan 1913
  - Preceded by: Hitra Municipality
- Disestablished: 1 Jan 1964
  - Succeeded by: Hitra Municipality
- Administrative centre: Kvenvær

Government
  - Mayor (1962–1963): Bjarne Faxvaag (H)

Area (upon dissolution)
  - Total: 215.96 km^{2} (83.38 sq mi)
  - Rank: #356 in Norway
- Highest elevation: 345 m (1,132 ft)

Population (1963)
  - Total: 855
  - Rank: #634 in Norway
  - Density: 4/km^{2} (10/sq mi)
  - Change (10 years): ▼ −11.7%
- Demonym: Kvenværing

Official language
  - Norwegian form: Neutral
- Time zone: UTC+01:00 (CET)
  - Summer (DST): UTC+02:00 (CEST)
- ISO 3166 code: NO-1618

Kvenvær is a former municipality in the old Sør-Trøndelag county, Norway. The 216-square-kilometre (83 sq mi) municipality existed from 1913 until 1964. It is located in what is now Hitra Municipality in Trøndelag county. The municipality included the western part of the island of Hitra plus many surrounding islands including Bispøyan. The administrative centre of the municipality was the village of Kvenvær where Kvenvær Church is located. Other villages in Kvenvær Municipality included Forsnes and Andersskogan.

Prior to its dissolution in 1963, the 216-square-kilometre (83 sq mi) municipality was the 356th largest by area out of the 689 municipalities in Norway. Kvenvær Municipality was the 634th most populous municipality in Norway with a population of about 855. The municipality's population density was 4 inhabitants per square kilometre (10/sq mi) and its population had decreased by 11.7% over the previous 10-year period.

== General information ==
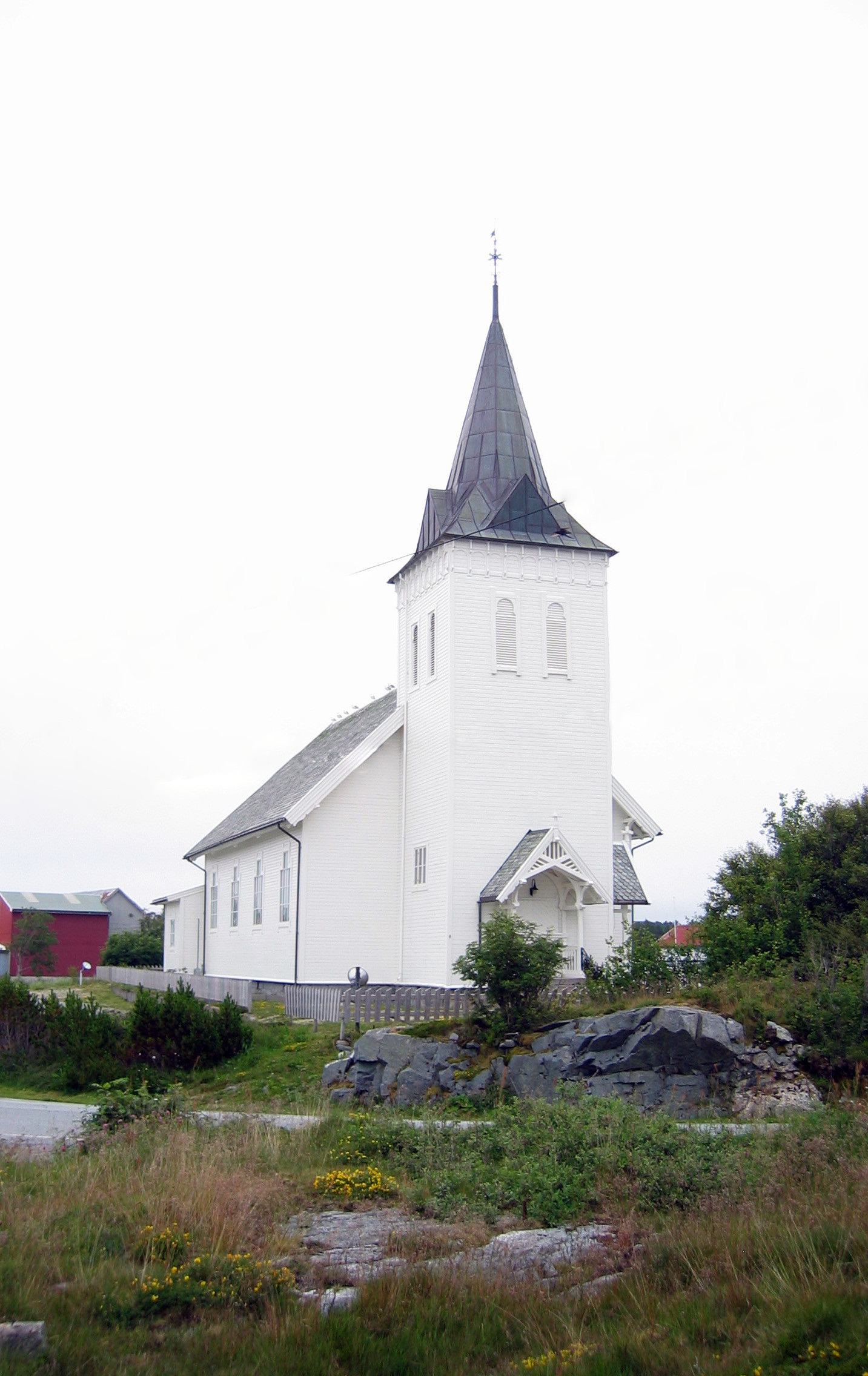
View of Kvenvær Church

The municipality of Kvenvær was established on 1 January 1913 when the municipality of Hitra was divided with the western part of the municipality (population: 1,157) becoming the new municipality of Kvenvær. During the 1960s, there were many municipal mergers across Norway due to the work of the Schei Committee.

During the 1960s, there were many municipal mergers across Norway due to the work of the Schei Committee. On 1 January 1964, Kvenvær Municipality (population: 840), Sandstad Municipality (population: 1,028), Fillan Municipality (population: 1,759), and Hitra Municipality (population: 1,344) were merged to form a new, larger Hitra Municipality.

=== Name ===
The municipality is named Kvenvær (Old Norse: Kvennaver) since the first Kvenvær Church was built there. The first element is kvenna which is the plural genitive case of kona which means "wife" or "woman". The last element is ver which means "fishing village".

=== Churches ===
The Church of Norway had one parish (sokn) within Kvenvær Municipality. At the time of the municipal dissolution, it was part of the Hitra prestegjeld and the Sør-Fosen prosti (deanery) in the Diocese of Nidaros.

Churches in Kvenvær Municipality
Parish (sokn)	Church name	Location of the church	Year built
Kvenvær	Kvenvær Church	Kvenvær	1909
Kvenvær	Forsnes Chapel	Forsnes	1935

== Geography ==
The municipality was located on the western part of the island of Hitra. It was bordered by Hitra Municipality to the northeast and Sandstad Municipality to the southeast. The highest point in the municipality was the 345-metre (1,132 ft) tall mountain Mørkdalstua, on the border with Sandstad Municipality and Kvenvær Municipality.

== Government ==
While it existed, Kvenvær Municipality was responsible for primary education (through 10th grade), outpatient health services, senior citizen services, welfare and other social services, zoning, economic development, and municipal roads and utilities. The municipality was governed by a municipal council of directly elected representatives. The mayor was indirectly elected by a vote of the municipal council. The municipality was under the jurisdiction of the Frostating Court of Appeal.

=== Municipal council ===
The municipal council (Herredsstyre) of Kvenvær Municipality was made up of representatives that were elected to four year terms. The tables below show the historical composition of the council by political party.

Kvenvær herredsstyre 1959–1963
Party name (in Norwegian)	Number of representatives
Local List(s) (Lokale lister)	13
Total number of members:	13

Kvenvær herredsstyre 1955–1959
Party name (in Norwegian)	Number of representatives
Local List(s) (Lokale lister)	13
Total number of members:	13

Kvenvær herredsstyre 1952–1955
Party name (in Norwegian)	Number of representatives
Local List(s) (Lokale lister)	12
Total number of members:	12

Kvenvær herredsstyre 1947–1951
Party name (in Norwegian)	Number of representatives
List of workers, fishermen, and small farmholders (Arbeidere, fiskere, småbrukere liste)	3
Joint List(s) of Non-Socialist Parties (Borgerlige Felleslister)	9
Total number of members:	12

Kvenvær herredsstyre 1945–1947
Party name (in Norwegian)	Number of representatives
Local List(s) (Lokale lister)	12
Total number of members:	12

Kvenvær herredsstyre 1937–1941*
Party name (in Norwegian)	Number of representatives
Labour Party (Arbeiderpartiet)	1
List of workers, fishermen, and small farmholders (Arbeidere, fiskere, småbrukere liste)	2
Local List(s) (Lokale lister)	9
Total number of members:	12
Note: Due to the German occupation of Norway during World War II, no elections were held for new municipal councils until after the war ended in 1945.

=== Mayors ===
The mayor (Norwegian: ordfører) of Kvenvær Municipality was the political leader of the municipality and the chairperson of the municipal council. Here is a list of people who held this position:

- 1913–1913: Kristian Skarsvåg
- 1914–1916: Anders Presthus
- 1917–1922: Johannes Forsnes (H)
- 1923–1925: John I. Ottervik
- 1926–1928: Johannes Forsnes (H)
- 1929–1931: Jens Grimstad (V)
- 1932–1937: Johannes Forsnes (H)
- 1938–1945: Jens Grimstad (V)
- 1946–1961: Martin Skaaren (H)
- 1962–1963: Bjarne Faxvaag (H)

== See also ==
- List of former municipalities of Norway
