= Hemnskjela =

Island in Trøndelag, Norway

- Interactive map of Hemnskjela

Geography
- Location: Trøndelag, Norway
- Coordinates: 63.4898°N 09.1191°E
- Area: 4.4 km^{2} (1.7 sq mi)
- Length: 2.3 km (1.43 mi)
- Width: 3.5 km (2.17 mi)
- Highest elevation: 164 m (538 ft)
- Highest point: Vettan

Administration
- Norway
- County: Trøndelag
- Municipality: Hitra Municipality

Hemnskjela is an island in Hitra Municipality in Trøndelag county, Norway. The 4.4-square-kilometre (1.7 sq mi) island is located in the Trondheimsleia strait at the mouth of the Hemnfjorden, just 2 kilometres (1.2 mi) south of the village of Sandstad on the nearby island of Hitra.

The southern entrance to the Hitra Tunnel is located on the island of Hemnskjela. The tunnel connects the village of Sandstad on the island of Hitra to Hemnskjela (underneath the Trondheimsleia). Then, the Hemnskjel bridge connects the island of Hemnskjela to the mainland part of Hitra Municipality. The Terningen Lighthouse lies about 3 kilometres (1.9 mi) west of the island.

== See also ==
- List of islands of Norway
