= Dolm Church =

Church in Trøndelag, Norway

- Dolm kirke
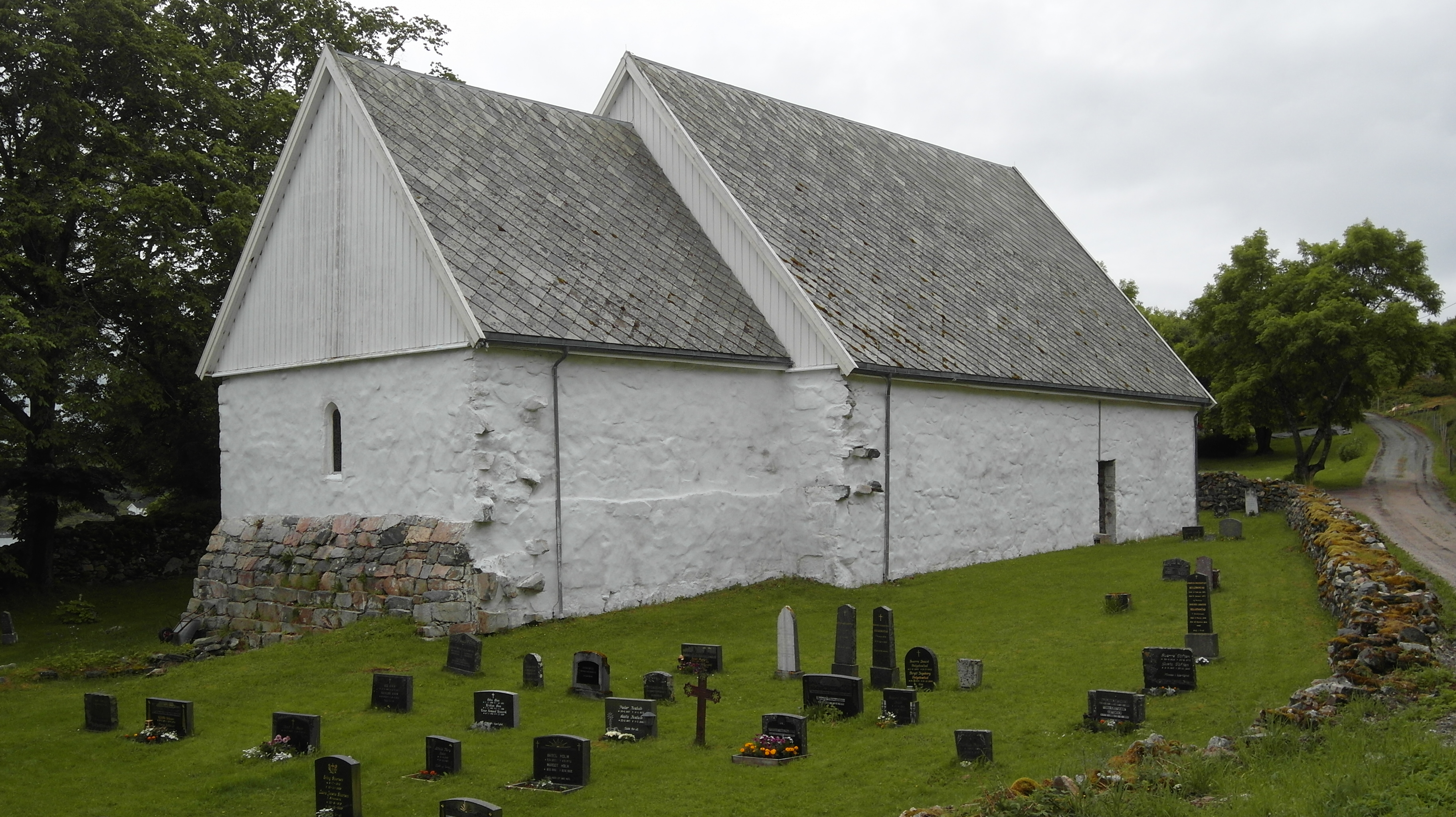
- View of the church
- Dolm Church
- 63.6328896489°N 08.706628829°E
- Location: Hitra Municipality, Trøndelag
- Country: Norway
- Denomination: Church of Norway
- Previous denomination: Catholic Church
- Churchmanship: Evangelical Lutheran

History
- Status: Parish church
- Founded: c. 1188
- Consecrated: c. 1188
- Events: Fires: 1709, 1772, 1848, and 1920

Architecture
- Functional status: Active
- Architectural type: Long church
- Style: Romanesque
- Completed: c. 1188 (838 years ago)

Specifications
- Capacity: 200
- Materials: Stone

Administration
- Diocese: Nidaros bispedømme
- Deanery: Orkdal prosti
- Parish: Hitra og Fillan
- Norwegian Cultural Heritage Site
- Type: Church
- Status: Automatically protected
- ID: 84027

Dolm Church (Norwegian: Dolm kirke) is a parish church of the Church of Norway in Hitra Municipality in Trøndelag county, Norway. It is located at Dolmvarden, on the southwestern coast of the island of Dolmøya. It is one of the churches for the Hitra og Fillan parish which is part of the Orkdal prosti (deanery) in the Diocese of Nidaros. The white, stone church was originally built around the year 1188 by an unknown architect. For centuries, it was the main church for the prestegjeld of Hitra. The church was built in a long church design and it has a Romanesque style with rounded arches and thick stone walls. The church seats about 200 people.

== History ==
The earliest existing historical records of the church date back to the year 1774, but the church is much older than that. Local tradition says it may have been built by monks from Ireland. The church is said to have been originally built in 1188 (or around that time), but one source says that it was built in the late 1400s. The stone long church was built in a Romanesque style, in a design that was very common in the 1100s and 1200s, but the walls are thinner than most churches of that time. They only measure about 1.2 to 1.3 metres (3 ft 11 in to 4 ft 3 in) in width, which could point to a later construction date. It has a rectangular nave with narrower and chancel with a lower roof line, and it has no church porch. The nave measures about 19 by 14 metres (62 ft × 46 ft) and the chancel measures about 9 by 10 metres (30 ft × 33 ft). The church is a stone church, but all the gable walls are built out of wood.

The church was damaged by fire on several occasions. The church burned and was rebuilt after fires in 1709, 1772, 1848, and most recently on 3 February 1920. However, after the fire in 1920, it was decided that a new, main church for the parish should be built across the strait in the village of Melandsjøen on the north shore of the island of Hitra. This was a controversial decision, but the parish agreed to rebuild the old Dolm Church and maintain it in exchange for the brand new church about 1 kilometre (0.62 mi) away on the larger island, where the majority of the people lived. So, in 1927 the new Hitra Church was built and that church became the new main church for the parish. Dolm Church was rebuilt, but it was now an annex church for the parish that is used infrequently.

=== Election church ===
In 1814, this church served as an election church (Norwegian: valgkirke). Together with more than 300 other parish churches across Norway, it was a polling station for elections to the 1814 Norwegian Constituent Assembly which wrote the Constitution of Norway. This was Norway's first national elections. Each church parish was a constituency that elected people called "electors" who later met together in each county to elect the representatives for the assembly that was to meet at Eidsvoll Manor later that year.

== Media gallery ==
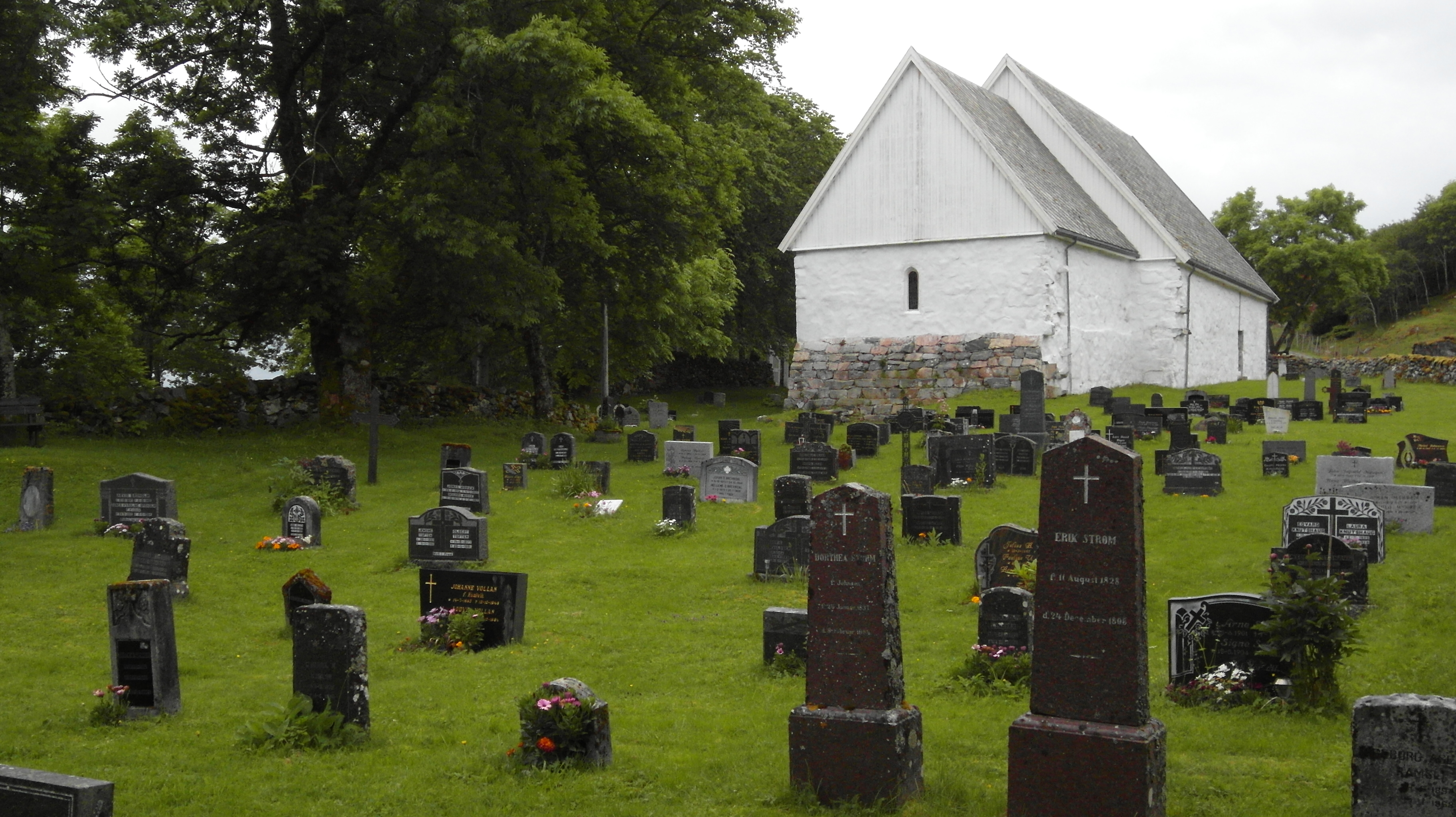

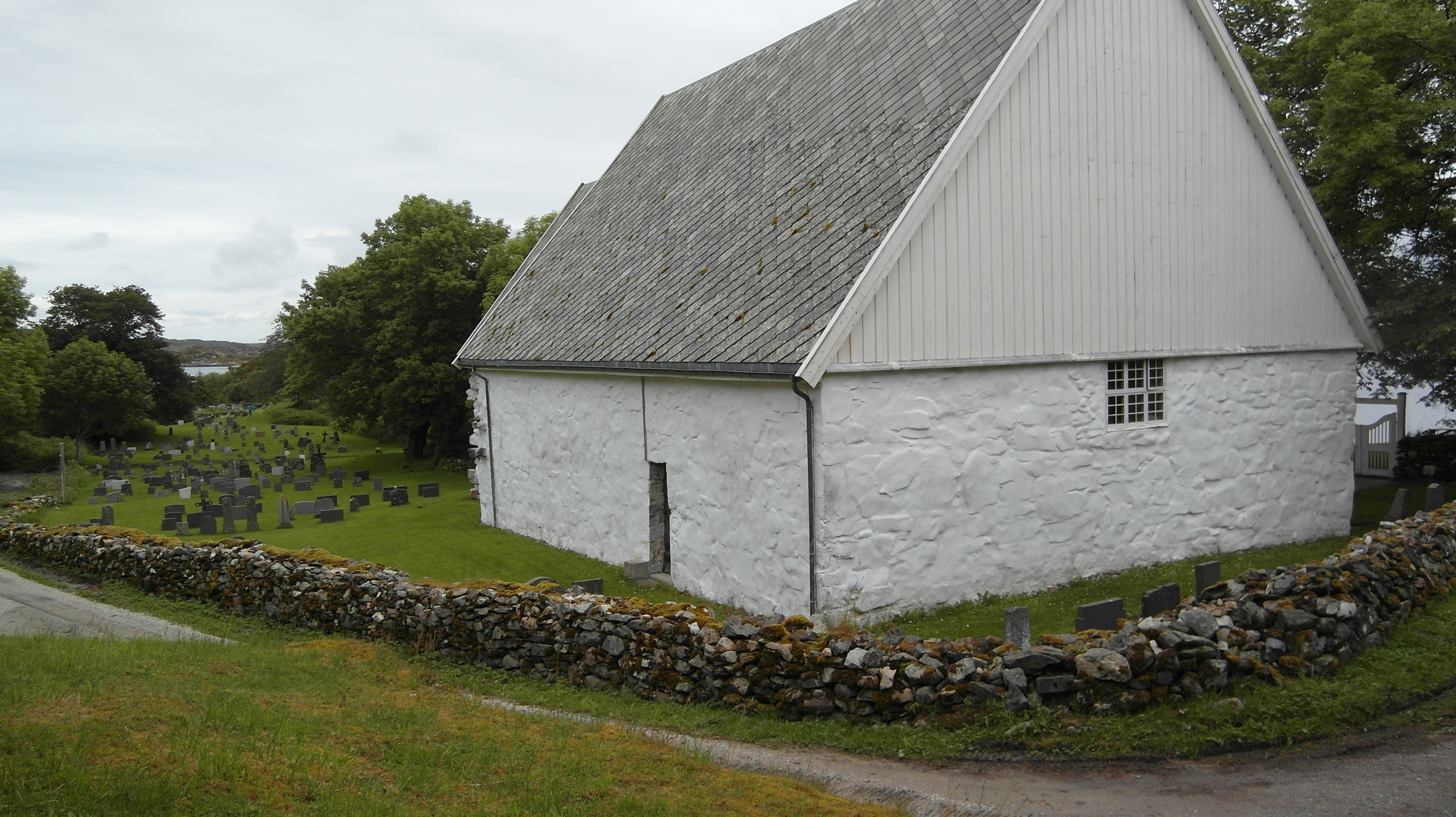

== See also ==
- List of churches in Nidaros
