= Fillan Municipality =

Former municipality in Trøndelag, Norway

Fillan Municipality Fillan herred
- Former municipality
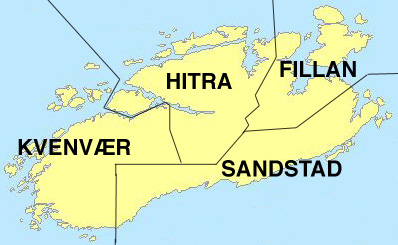
- Map of the island of Hitra with the old municipal boundaries (originally Fillan also included Sandstad)

- Sør-Trøndelag within Norway

- Fillan within Sør-Trøndelag
- Coordinates: 63.6063°N 08.9696°E
- Country: Norway
- County: Sør-Trøndelag
- District: Fosen
- Established: 1 Jan 1886
  - Preceded by: Hitra Municipality
- Disestablished: 1 Jan 1964
  - Succeeded by: Hitra Municipality
- Administrative centre: Fillan

Government
  - Mayor (1948–1963): Arne Schanche Nilsen (Bp)

Area (upon dissolution)
  - Total: 113.40 km^{2} (43.78 sq mi)
  - Rank: #496 in Norway
- Highest elevation: 216 m (709 ft)

Population (1963)
  - Total: 1,786
  - Rank: #478 in Norway
  - Density: 15.7/km^{2} (41/sq mi)
  - Change (10 years): ▲ +0.3%
- Demonym: Fillværing

Official language
  - Norwegian form: Neutral
- Time zone: UTC+01:00 (CET)
  - Summer (DST): UTC+02:00 (CEST)
- ISO 3166 code: NO-1616

Fillan is a former municipality in the old Sør-Trøndelag county, Norway. The 113-square-kilometre (44 sq mi) municipality existed from 1886 until its dissolution in 1964. It is now part of Hitra Municipality in Trøndelag county. The municipality included the northeastern part of the island of Hitra surrounding the Fillfjorden, plus about 100 islands, islets, and skerries—including Fjellværsøya and Ulvøya. The administrative centre of the municipality was the village of Fillan. Other villages in the municipality included Ansnes, Nordbotn, and Ulvan.

Prior to its dissolution in 1963, the 113-square-kilometre (44 sq mi) municipality was the 496th largest by area out of the 689 municipalities in Norway. Fillan Municipality was the 478th most populous municipality in Norway with a population of about 1,786. The municipality's population density was 15.7 inhabitants per square kilometre (41/sq mi) and its population had increased by 0.3% over the previous 10-year period.

The former municipality had a church and a chapel in it, both of which now form a parish within the present-day Hitra Municipality. Fillan Church is located in the village of Fillan and Nordbotn Chapel on the island of Fjellværsøya.

== General information ==
The municipality of Fillan was established on 1 January 1886 when the old Hitra Municipality was divided into two separate municipalities: Hitra Municipality (population: 2,241) in the west and the new Fillan Municipality (population: 2,241) in the east. On 1 July 1914, Fillan Municipality was divided into two separate municipalities: Fillan Municipality (population: 1,543) in the north and the new Sandstad Municipality (population: 947) in the south and shrinking the municipality from 244 square kilometres (94 sq mi) to only 113 square kilometres (44 sq mi). During the 1960s, there were many municipal mergers across Norway due to the work of the Schei Committee. On 1 January 1964, Fillan Municipality (population: 1,759), Kvenvær Municipality (population: 840), Sandstad Municipality (population: 1,028), and Hitra Municipality (population: 1,344) were merged to form a new, larger Hitra Municipality.

=== Name ===
The municipality (originally the parish) is named after the old Fillan farm (Old Norse: Filli or Fillar) since the first Fillan Church was built there. The name is likely the original name for the local Fillfjorden, but the name's meaning is uncertain.

=== Churches ===
The Church of Norway had one parish (sokn) within Fillan Municipality. At the time of the municipal dissolution, it was part of the Hitra prestegjeld and the Sør-Fosen prosti (deanery) in the Diocese of Nidaros.

Churches in Fillan Municipality
Parish (sokn)	Church name	Location of the church	Year built
Fillan	Fillan Church	Fillan	1789
Fillan	Nordbotn Chapel	Nordbotn	1900

== Geography ==
The municipality was located on the northeastern part of the island of Hitra. It was bordered by Hitra Municipality to the west and Sandstad Municipality to the south. The highest point in the municipality was the 216-metre (709 ft) tall mountain Staurfjellet, on the border of Fillan Municipality and Sandstad Municipality.

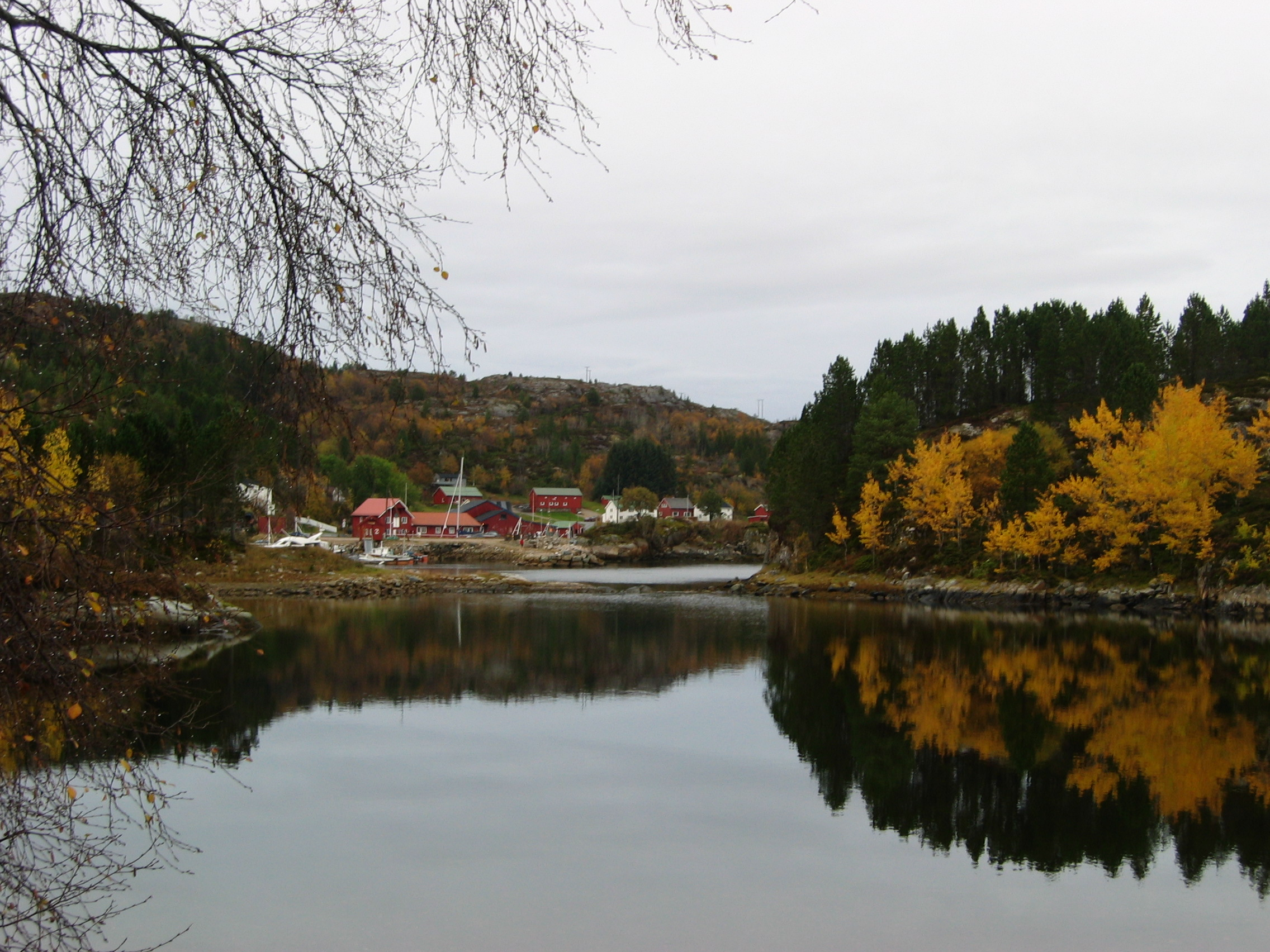
View of the village of Fillan

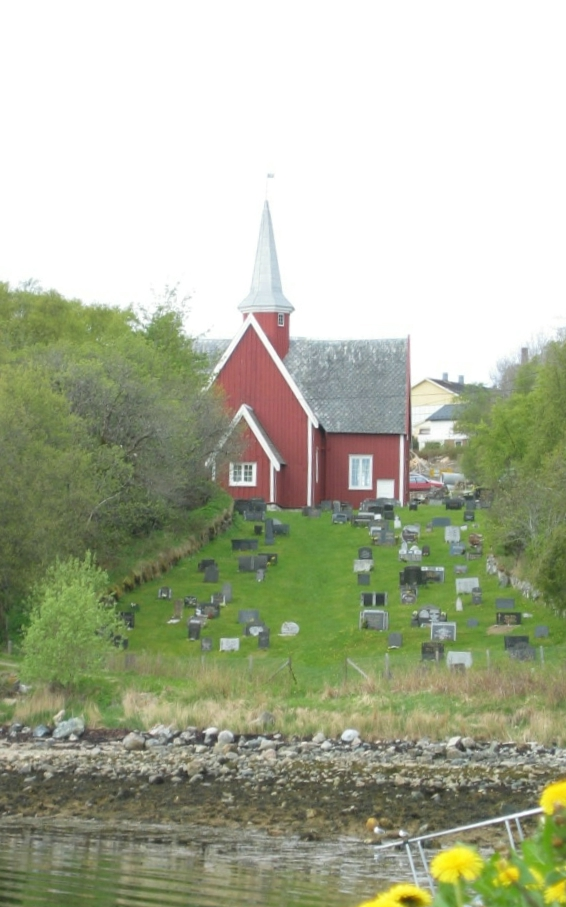
Fillan Church

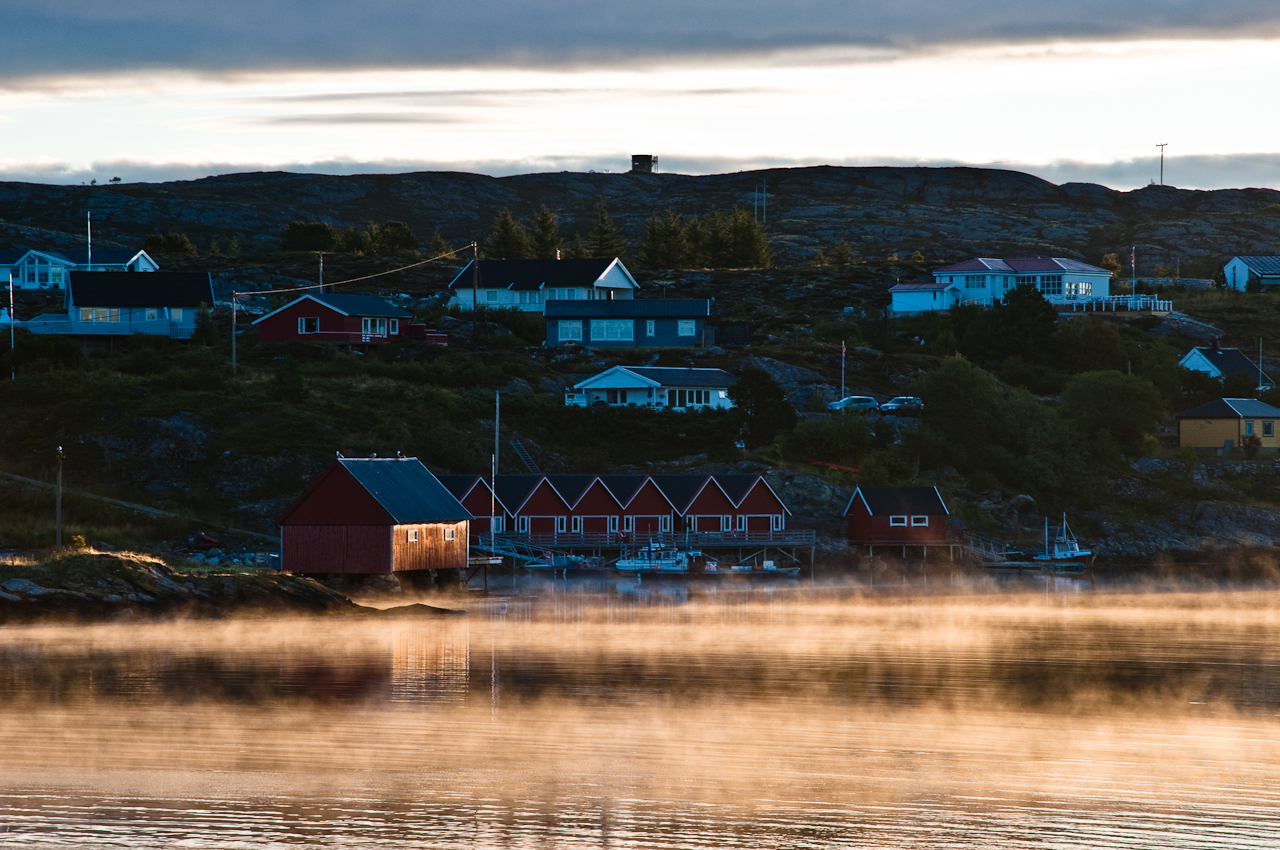
Knarrlagsund village

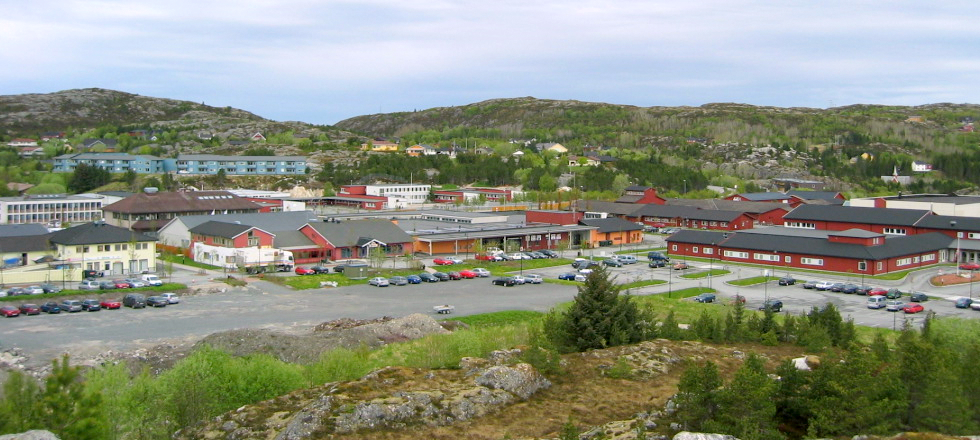
View of the village of Fillan

== Government ==
While it existed, Fillan Municipality was responsible for primary education (through 10th grade), outpatient health services, senior citizen services, welfare and other social services, zoning, economic development, and municipal roads and utilities. The municipality was governed by a municipal council of directly elected representatives. The mayor was indirectly elected by a vote of the municipal council. The municipality was under the jurisdiction of the Frostating Court of Appeal.

=== Municipal council ===
The municipal council (Herredsstyre) of Fillan Municipality was made up of 17 representatives that were elected to four-year terms. The tables below show the historical composition of the council by political party.

Fillan herredsstyre 1959–1963
Party name (in Norwegian)	Number of representatives
Labour Party (Arbeiderpartiet)	4
Christian Democratic Party (Kristelig Folkeparti)	5
Joint List(s) of Non-Socialist Parties (Borgerlige Felleslister)	8
Total number of members:	17

Fillan herredsstyre 1955–1959
Party name (in Norwegian)	Number of representatives
Labour Party (Arbeiderpartiet)	4
Farmers' Party (Bondepartiet)	3
Liberal Party (Venstre)	2
Joint List(s) of Non-Socialist Parties (Borgerlige Felleslister)	8
Total number of members:	17

Fillan herredsstyre 1951–1955
Party name (in Norwegian)	Number of representatives
Labour Party (Arbeiderpartiet)	4
Christian Democratic Party (Kristelig Folkeparti)	5
Joint List(s) of Non-Socialist Parties (Borgerlige Felleslister)	7
Total number of members:	16

Fillan herredsstyre 1947–1951
Party name (in Norwegian)	Number of representatives
Labour Party (Arbeiderpartiet)	4
Joint List(s) of Non-Socialist Parties (Borgerlige Felleslister)	12
Total number of members:	16

Fillan herredsstyre 1945–1947
Party name (in Norwegian)	Number of representatives
List of workers, fishermen, and small farmholders (Arbeidere, fiskere, småbrukere liste)	12
Joint List(s) of Non-Socialist Parties (Borgerlige Felleslister)	3
Local List(s) (Lokale lister)	1
Total number of members:	16

Fillan herredsstyre 1937–1941*
Party name (in Norwegian)	Number of representatives
Labour Party (Arbeiderpartiet)	6
List of workers, fishermen, and small farmholders (Arbeidere, fiskere, småbrukere liste)	3
Joint List(s) of Non-Socialist Parties (Borgerlige Felleslister)	7
Total number of members:	16
Note: Due to the German occupation of Norway during World War II, no elections were held for new municipal councils until after the war ended in 1945.

=== Mayors ===
The mayor (Norwegian: ordfører) of Fillan Municipality was the political leader of the municipality and the chairperson of the municipal council. Here is a list of people who held this position:

- 1886–1889: Ole Olsen Leer
- 1890–1890: Henrik Bernhard Melandsø
- 1891–1891: Ole Olsen Leer
- 1892–1893: D. Strøm
- 1894–1900: Jakob L. Moxnes
- 1905–1910: Olaus Selvaag
- 1911–1916: Petter Hansen Eidsvaag
- 1917–1922: Olaus Selvaag (FV)
- 1922–1931: Ole B. Tranvik (FV)
- 1932–1937: Harald Alfred Eriksen (V)
- 1938–1941: Anton A. Fjellvær (V)
- 1943–1945: Harald Christian Kjesbu (NS)
- 1945–1945: Anton A. Fjellvær (V)
- 1946–1947: Harald Alfred Eriksen (V)
- 1948–1963: Arne Schanche Nilsen (Bp)

== See also ==
- List of former municipalities of Norway
