= Hammarvika =

Village in Frøya Municipality, Norway

- Village
- Interactive map of Hammarvika
- Location within Trøndelag Location within Norway
- Coordinates: 63.6958°N 08.8098°E
- Country: Norway
- Region: Central Norway
- County: Trøndelag
- District: Fosen
- Municipality: Frøya Municipality

Area
  - Total: 0.79 km^{2} (0.31 sq mi)
- Elevation: 0.5 m (1.6 ft)

Population (2024)
  - Total: 549
  - Density: 695/km^{2} (1,800/sq mi)
- Time zone: UTC+01:00 (CET)
  - Summer (DST): UTC+02:00 (CEST)
- Post Code: 7263 Hamarvik

Hammarvika is a village in Frøya Municipality in Trøndelag county, Norway. The village is located about 4 kilometres (2.5 mi) south of the municipal center of Sistranda on the southeastern side of the island of Frøya. The 0.79-square-kilometre (200-acre) village has a population (2024) of 549 and a population density of 695 inhabitants per square kilometre (1,800/sq mi).

The Frøya Tunnel to the neighboring island of Hitra begins at Hammarvika and goes underneath the Frøyfjorden to the south.
