= Hitra Wind Farm =

Wind farm in Hitra, Norway

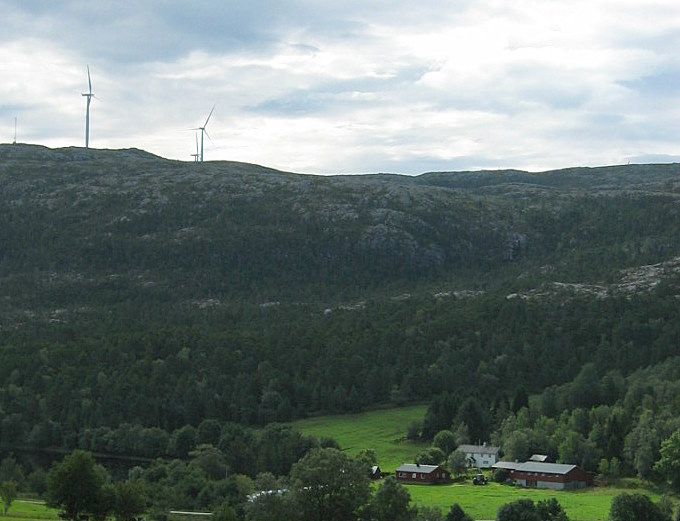
- View of the farm on top of the mountain
- Official name: Hitra vindpark
- Country: Norway
- Location: Hitra, Trøndelag
- Coordinates: 63°32′31″N 08°45′32″E
- Status: Operational
- Construction began: July 2003
- Commission date: October 14, 2004
- Construction cost: 450 million kr
- Owner: Statkraft

Wind farm
- Type: Onshore
- Hub height: 70 m (230 ft)
- Rotor diameter: 82.4 m (270 ft)
- Site elevation: 300 m (984 ft)

Power generation
- Units operational: 24 x 2.3 MW
- Nameplate capacity: 55.2 MW
- Capacity factor: 31.0%
- Annual net output: 150 GW·h

Hitra Wind Farm is a 24-turbine wind farm located in Hitra Municipality in Trøndelag county, Norway and operated by Statkraft. The farm is located on top of the Elsfjellet plateau in the central part of the island of Hitra, just 3 kilometres (1.9 mi) south of the village of Straum and about 15 kilometres (9.3 mi) west of the village of Sandstad. Until the expansion of the Smøla Wind Farm in 2005, Hitra was the largest wind farm in the country and had cost 450 million kr.

Each of the 24 wind turbines can produce 2.3 megawatts (3,100 hp) of power for a maximum generated power of 55 megawatts (74,000 hp) and an annual production of 150 gigawatt-hours (540 TJ) for the whole farm. The farm was opened on 14 October 2004.

The Fosen Vind 1 gigawatt (1,300,000 hp) wind farm complex will include the nearby Hitra 2 wind farm.

== See also ==
- Fosen Vind
