= Helgbustadøya =

Island in Trøndelag, Norway

- Interactive map of Helgbustadøya

Geography
- Location: Trøndelag, Norway
- Coordinates: 63.5791°N 08.5286°E
- Area: 13 km^{2} (5.0 sq mi)
- Length: 3.5 km (2.17 mi)
- Width: 6.5 km (4.04 mi)
- Coastline: 22 km (13.7 mi)
- Highest elevation: 75 m (246 ft)
- Highest point: Reitmarkåsen

Administration
- Norway
- County: Trøndelag
- Municipality: Hitra Municipality

Helgbustadøya is an island in Hitra Municipality in Trøndelag county, Norway. It is an island located in the Straumsfjorden just off the northwestern coast of the island of Hitra, just east of the Bispøyan islands, about 10 kilometres (6.2 mi) northeast of the village of Kvenvær, and about 8 kilometres (5.0 mi) southwest of the village of Melandsjøen.

The eastern third of the island has a pine forest that is a nature reserve and the western two-thirds is a rocky, barren plateau that has many ponds and marsh areas.

== See also ==
- List of islands of Norway
