= Frøya Tunnel =

Undersea road tunnel in Trøndelag, Norway

Frøya Tunnel Frøyatunnelen
- Interactive map of Frøya Tunnel; Frøyatunnelen

Overview
- Location: Trøndelag, Norway
- Coordinates: 63.6767°N 08.8060°E
- Status: In use
- Route: Fv714
- Start: Dolmøya
- End: Hammarvika

Operation
- Opened: 23 June 2000
- Operator: Statens vegvesen
- Traffic: Automotive
- Toll: Until 2003

Technical
- Length: 5,305 metres (3.3 mi)
- Min elevation: −164 metres (−538 ft)

The Frøya Tunnel (Norwegian: Frøyatunnelen) is an undersea tunnel connecting Frøya Municipality and Hitra Municipality in Trøndelag county, Norway. The tunnel, on county road 714, is located about 4 kilometres (2.5 mi) south of the village of Sistranda on the island of Frøya.

The 5,305-metre (17,405 ft) long road tunnel reaches a depth of 164 metres (538 ft) below sea level. It begins in the village of Hammarvika on the island of Frøya and travels south under the Frøyfjorden to the island of Dolmøya in Hitra Municipality. Dolmøya is also connected to the island of Hitra by a short bridge.
