= Frøyfjorden =

Fjord in Trøndelag, Norway

- Interactive map of the fjord
- Location: Trøndelag county, Norway
- Coordinates: 63.6301°N 08.4074°E
- Type: Strait
- Basin countries: Norway
- Max. length: 25 kilometres (16 mi)
- Max. width: 9 kilometres (5.6 mi)
- Average depth: 100 metres (330 ft)
- Islands: Dolmøya, Bispøyan

Frøyfjorden is a strait between the islands of Frøya and Hitra in Trøndelag county, Norway. The 25-kilometre (16 mi) long strait is rather shallow, only about 100 metres (330 ft) at its deepest. The Frøya Tunnel goes beneath the fjord from Hammarvika in Frøya Municipality to the island of Dolmøya in Hitra Municipality.
