= Fosen Vind Wind Farm =

Wind farm complex in Fosen, Norway

Fosen Vind
- Country: Norway
- Location: Fosen peninsula, Trøndelag
- Coordinates: 63°43′N 10°15′E
- Status: Operational
- Construction began: August 2016
- Commission date: March 2021
- Construction cost: 1.1 billion €
- Owners: Statkraft (52.1%), Aneo (7.9%; formerly part of TrønderEnergi), Nordic Wind Power DA (40.0%)

Wind farm
- Type: Onshore
- Hub height: 87 m
- Rotor diameter: 117 m, 112 m

Power generation
- Make and model: Vestas V117-3.6 MW (248), V112-3.6 MW (30)
- Units under const.: 278 × 3.6 MW
- Nameplate capacity: 1,000 MW
- Capacity factor: 39% (projected)
- Annual net output: 3,400 GW·h

External links
- Website: www.fosenvind.no

Fosen Vind is a complex of six onshore wind farms in Fosen, Norway, commissioned in 2018-20. With a nameplate capacity of 1 GW the project is Europe's second largest onshore wind farm (second to the Markbygden Wind Farm); it more than doubled Norway's capacity for wind power generation.

== Layout ==
Due to its size and the geography of the chosen area, Fosen Vind is partitioned into a group of six individually named wind farms.

Name	Units	Power (MW)	Construction start
Harbaksfjellet	30	108	2018
Roan	71	255.6	2016
Storheia	80	288	2016
Kvenndalsfjellet	28	100.8	2018
Geitfjellet	43	154.8	2018
Hitra 2	26	93.6	2018

== Technology ==
The site has been chosen for its wind pattern with annual yields of more than 3,600 full load hours close to 9 m/s, similar to offshore sites.

The complex of six wind farms will comprise 278 wind turbines from Vestas, 248 V117 and 30 V112, each with its capacity optimized from 3.45 MW to 3.6 MW, for a total capacity of 1,000 MW. Each turbine has a nacelle height of 87 m and a wing span of either 117 m or 112 m.

The transmission lines will use transmission towers of composite materials with foundations that do not require the use of explosives, reducing the environmental impact of the construction work.

The 71 turbine foundations for the Roan part of the farm will use rock anchor foundation technology and will be delivered by the Norwegian subsidiary of Peikko Group from April 2017 to the spring of 2018.

== Economy ==
The expected cost of the project is 1.1 billion €. The investors are Statkraft (52.1%), TrønderEnergi (7.9%) and a consortium Nordic Wind Power DA (40.0%) backed by Credit Suisse.

The levelised cost of energy (LCoE) is estimated in the range 35 €/MWh to 40 €/MWh, which is below a typical Norwegian wind farm price of 44 €/MWh and described as a rock-bottom price obtained via economies of scale.

The project will receive government subsidies in the form of tradeable green certificates, which are typically valued at 15 €/MWh. Together with a current system price around 18 €/MWh to 20 €/MWh, the operator will likely receive the lower estimate of the LCoE.

Of the expected annual production of 3.4 TWh (corresponding to 3,400 full load hours), about one third will actually be sold to Norsk Hydro as baseload supply for their aluminium production under a power purchase agreement. Specifically, the agreement stipulates delivery of around 0.6 TWh in 2020, around 1.0 TWh annually from 2021-2035 and 0.7 TWh annually from 2036-2039, for a total of about 18 TWh over a 20-year period.

== Criticism ==
On August 20, 2016, five days into the construction, two hundred people gathered at the construction site to protest against the project. Norges Naturvernforbund criticized the choice of site as a reindeer habitat of great importance to southern Sami reindeer herders. The reindeer herders have demanded that the district court stop the construction work, citing violations of human rights and rights of indigenous people. In response, Fosen Vind cited their possession of necessary permits and declined to halt construction.

The disagreement led to a trial before the Høyesterett (Supreme Court), which Fosen Vind and the Norwegian state lost, on the basis of breaking human rights. Despite the ruling, the windmills have not been dismantled, increasing tension between the Sami people and the Norwegian state.

On February 23, 2023, the 500 day anniversary of the court verdict, several protesters from the youth wing of the Norwegian Sámi Association and Nature and Youth gathered outside the entrance of the Ministry of Petroleum and Energy in Oslo to protest against the lack of action from the government. The protesters blocked the entrance, sleeping there overnight, and refused to move until the government obeys the court ruling. In the afternoon of February 27, protesters, including Swedish environmental activist Greta Thunberg, chained themselves to the building to block access, but were removed by police by that night.

== See also ==
- Hitra Wind Farm
- Renewable energy in Norway
- List of largest power stations in the world
- List of onshore wind farms
