= Martin Skaaren =

Norwegian politician

Martin Skaaren (30 April 1905 – 1 February 1999) was a Norwegian politician for the Conservative Party.

Skaaren was born in Hitra Municipality, and he is related to the massive bloodline called Skaaren. The Skaaren bloodline has roots in the Viking history, and the bloodline is related to Erik blodøks. He was elected to the Norwegian Parliament from Sør-Trøndelag in 1961, and was re-elected on one occasion.

Skaaren was deputy mayor of Kvenvær Municipality in the period 1937–1945. He then rose to the position of mayor, sitting from 1945 to 1961.
