= Fjellværsøya =

Island in Trøndelag, Norway

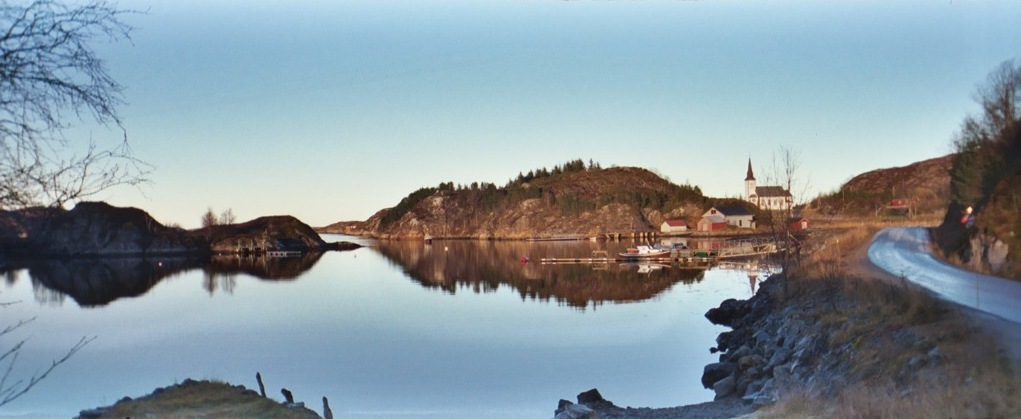
- View of the Nordbotn church on Fjellværsøya
- Interactive map of Fjellværsøya

Geography
- Location: Trøndelag, Norway
- Coordinates: 63.6390°N 09.0789°E
- Area: 26.7 km^{2} (10.3 sq mi)
- Length: 9 km (5.6 mi)
- Width: 6 km (3.7 mi)
- Highest elevation: 143 m (469 ft)
- Highest point: Haglebjøra

Administration
- Norway
- County: Trøndelag
- Municipality: Hitra Municipality

Fjellværsøya is an island in Hitra Municipality in Trøndelag county, Norway. The island is located in the eastern part of Hitra Municipality, east of the main island of Hitra and it is surrounded by the Frøyfjorden, Kråkvågfjorden, and Fillfjorden.

The small islands of Herøya and Ulvøya lie to the north, the big island of Hitra to the south and west, and the Kråkvåg islands (in nearby Ørland Municipality) to the east. The 26.7-square-kilometre (10.3 sq mi) island is connected to the village of Ansnes on the island of Hitra by the Krabbsundet bridge and to the village Knarrlagsund on the island of Ulvøya by the Knarrlagsund bridge.

The main industries on the island include agriculture, fishing, and fish processing. The Nordbotn Chapel is located in the village of Nordbotn on the northeastern part of the island.

== See also ==
- List of islands of Norway
