= John Aalmo =

Norwegian politician

John Aalmo (7 August 1902 – 19 July 1981) was a Norwegian politician for the Conservative Party.

He was born in Aure Municipality as a son of teacher and mayor Ole Aalmo (1861–1943) and Gjertrud, née Rimstad (1876–1937). He spent most of his career, from 1958 to 1978, in Fosen Trafikklag. He was also a board member here as well as Fosen Aktie Dampskipsselskap.

Aalmo served as mayor of Sandstad Municipality from 1934 to 1957, and was a member of the county council during the same period. He served as a deputy representative to the Parliament of Norway from Sør-Trøndelag during the terms 1954–1957 and 1958–1961. In total he met during 95 days of parliamentary session.
