= Dolmøya =

Island in Trøndelag, Norway

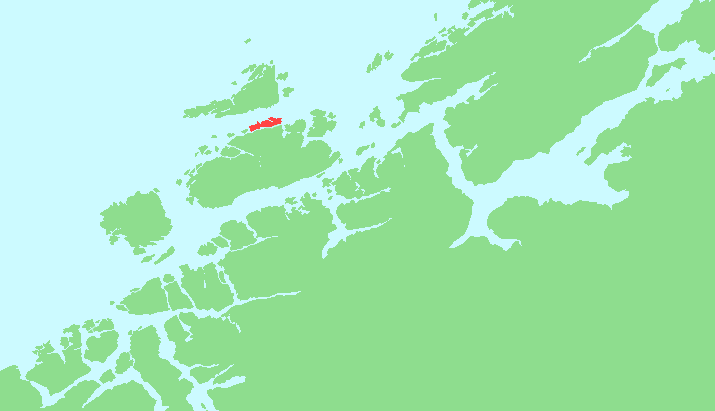
- Locator map of Dolmøya, Sør-Trøndelag, Norway
- Interactive map of Dolmøya

Geography
- Location: Trøndelag, Norway
- Coordinates: 63.6430°N 08.7544°E
- Area: 14.5 km^{2} (5.6 sq mi)
- Length: 10 km (6 mi)
- Width: 2 km (1.2 mi)
- Highest elevation: 63 m (207 ft)
- Highest point: Hjertåsen

Administration
- Norway
- County: Trøndelag
- Municipality: Hitra Municipality

Dolmøya is an island in Hitra Municipality in Trøndelag county, Norway. The island is located in the Frøyfjorden, just north of the village of Melandsjøen on the island of Hitra. The island of Dolmøya is flat, swampy, and has very few trees. The 14.5-square-kilometre (5.6 sq mi) island is also the location of the southern entrance to the Frøya Tunnel. The medieval Dolm Church is located on the southeastern shore of the island. There were about 488 residents living on the island in 2017.

== See also ==
- List of islands of Norway
