= Ansnes =

Village in Hitra Municipality, Norway

- Village
- Interactive map of Ansnes
- Location within Trøndelag Location within Norway
- Coordinates: 63.6379°N 08.9944°E
- Country: Norway
- Region: Central Norway
- County: Trøndelag
- District: Fosen
- Municipality: Hitra Municipality
- Elevation: 7 m (23 ft)
- Time zone: UTC+01:00 (CET)
  - Summer (DST): UTC+02:00 (CEST)
- Post Code: 7241 Ansnes

Ansnes is a village in Hitra Municipality in Trøndelag county, Norway. The village is located along the Fillfjorden on the northeastern coast of the island of Hitra. There is a bridge from Ansnes to the island of Fjellværsøya to the east. The village is located about 6 kilometres (3.7 mi) north of the village of Fillan (the municipal centre). The village has a fishing harbor and is home to many aspects of the fishing industry.
