= Sandstad =

Village in Hitra Municipality, Norway

- Village
- Interactive map of Sandstad
- Location within Trøndelag Location within Norway
- Coordinates: 63.5224°N 09.0954°E
- Country: Norway
- Region: Trøndelag
- County: Trøndelag
- District: Fosen
- Municipality: Hitra Municipality

Area
  - Total: 0.36 km^{2} (0.14 sq mi)
- Elevation: 17 m (56 ft)

Population (2024)
  - Total: 207
  - Density: 575/km^{2} (1,490/sq mi)
- Time zone: UTC+01:00 (CET)
  - Summer (DST): UTC+02:00 (CEST)
- Post Code: 7246 Sandstad

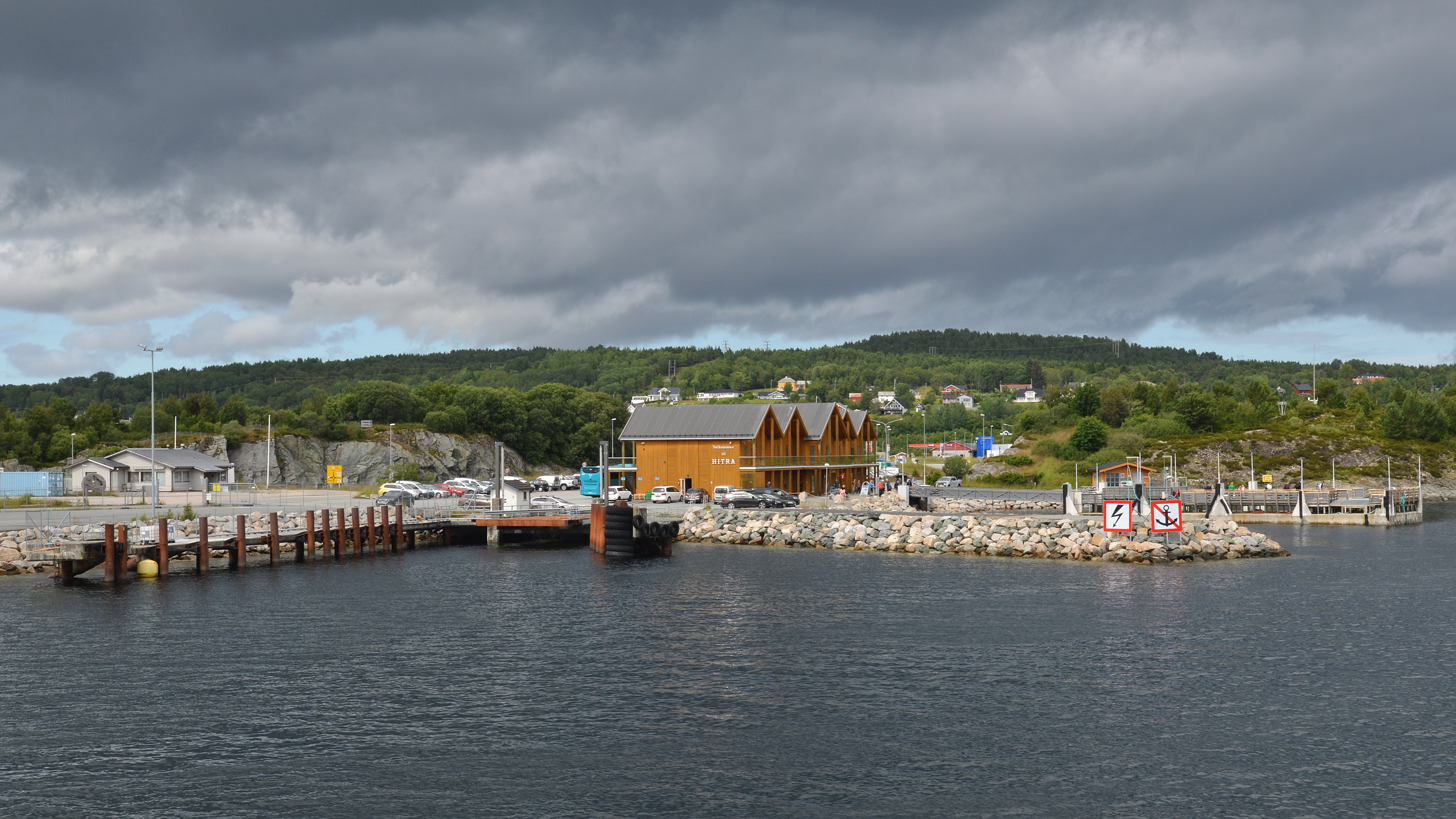
Sandstad Ferry Terminal in July 2022

Sandstad is a village in Hitra Municipality in Trøndelag county, Norway. The village is located along the Trondheimsleia on the southeastern coast of the island of Hitra, about 6 kilometres (3.7 mi) southwest of the village of Hestvika. The north entrance to the Hitra Tunnel lies just south of the village of Sandstad. The Terningen lighthouse lies in the Trondheimsleia, about 3 kilometres (1.9 mi) southwest of the village. Sandstad Church is located here.

The 0.36-square-kilometre (89-acre) village has a population (2024) of 207 and a population density of 575 inhabitants per square kilometre (1,490/sq mi).

== History ==
The village was the administrative centre of the old Sandstad Municipality which existed from 1 July 1914 until its dissolution on 1 January 1964.
