= Bispøyan =

Island in Trøndelag, Norway

- Interactive map of Bispøyan

Geography
- Location: Trøndelag, Norway
- Coordinates: 63.5881°N 08.4105°E

Administration
- Norway
- County: Trøndelag
- Municipality: Hitra Municipality

Bispøyan is a group of islands in Hitra Municipality in Trøndelag county, Norway. They are located north of the village of Kvenvær on the island of Hitra, and northwest of the island of Helgbustadøya. The largest islands in the group include Burøya, Olderøya, Monsøya, and Henriksøya. The rocky islands are now all uninhabited, but the many homes on them are used as summer vacation homes.

== See also ==
- List of islands of Norway
