= Melandsjøen =

Village in Hitra Municipality, Norway

Melandsjøen Melandsjø
- Village
- Interactive map of Melandsjøen
- Location within Trøndelag Location within Norway
- Coordinates: 63.6291°N 08.7319°E
- Country: Norway
- Region: Central Norway
- County: Trøndelag
- District: Fosen
- Municipality: Hitra Municipality
- Elevation: 5 m (16 ft)
- Time zone: UTC+01:00 (CET)
  - Summer (DST): UTC+02:00 (CEST)
- Post Code: 7250 Melandsjø

Melandsjøen is a village in Hitra Municipality in Trøndelag county, Norway. The village is located on the north shore of the island of Hitra, just across the strait from the island of Dolmøya.

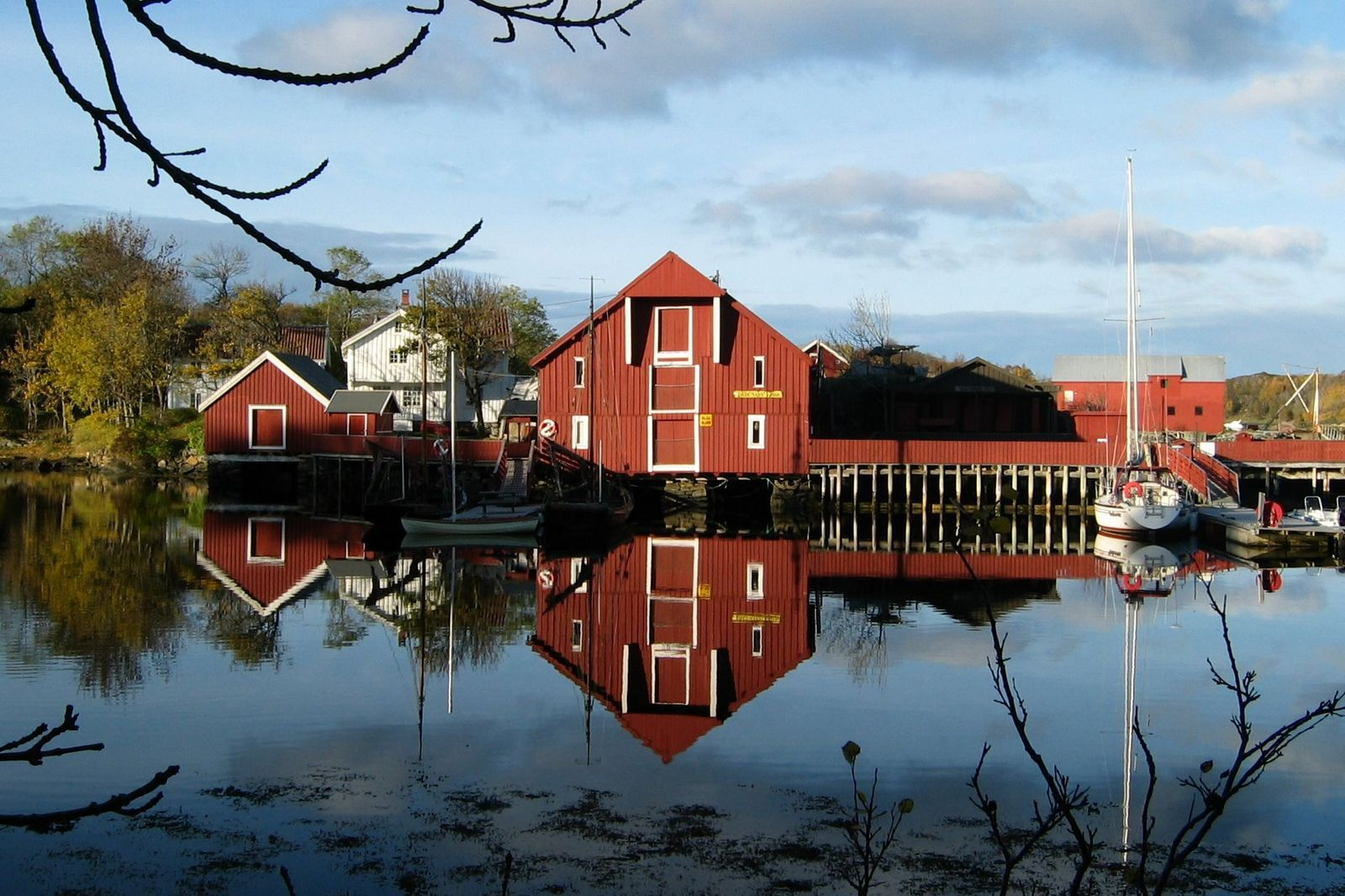
View of Hopsjø harbour area in Melandsjøen

Melandsjøen is the home to the Hitra Church. This nearly square-shaped, stone church is the main church of the municipality.

== History ==
Melandsjøen was the administrative center of Hitra Municipality from 1838 until 1964 when the four municipalities on the island were merged and the administrative center was moved to the village of Fillan.
