= Mørkdalstua =

Mountain in Trøndelag, Norway

- Mørkdalstuva
- Interactive map of the mountain

Highest point
- Elevation: 345 m (1,132 ft)
- Prominence: 345 m (1,132 ft)
- Isolation: 15.1 km (9.4 mi)
- Coordinates: 63.4940°N 08.5139°E

Geography
- Location: Trøndelag, Norway
- Topo map: 1421 IV Skardsøya

Mørkdalstua is the tallest mountain on the island of Hitra which is located in Hitra Municipality, Trøndelag county, Norway. The 345-metre (1,132 ft) tall mountain lies on the western side of the island, about 8 kilometres (5.0 mi) northeast of the village of Forsnes and 7.5 kilometres (4.7 mi) southeast of the village of Kvenvær.

== Name ==
The mountain is named after the Mørkdalen valley. The last element is the finite form of tue which means "tussock". The valley name Mørkdalen is a compound of mørk which means "dark" and the finite form of dal which means "dale" or "valley".

== See also ==
- List of mountains of Norway by height
