= Hitra (island) =

Island in Trøndelag, Norway

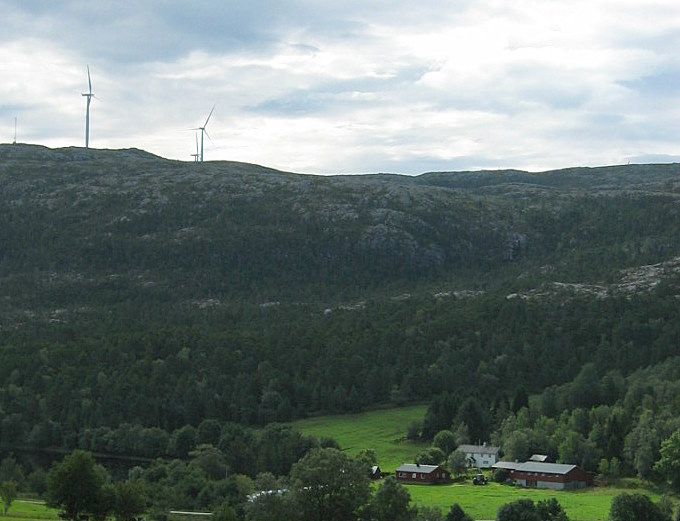
- August 2008 view of the island near Straum
- Interactive map of Hitra

Geography
- Location: Trøndelag, Norway
- Coordinates: 63.5439°N 08.7562°E
- Area: 571.5 km^{2} (220.7 sq mi)
- Area rank: 7th largest in Norway
- Length: 45.7 km (28.4 mi)
- Width: 18.1 km (11.25 mi)
- Highest elevation: 345 m (1132 ft)
- Highest point: Mørkdalstuva

Administration
- Norway
- County: Trøndelag
- Municipality: Hitra Municipality

Hitra is an island in Hitra Municipality in Trøndelag county, Norway. The 571.5-square-kilometre (220.7 sq mi) island is the 7th largest island in Norway (excluding Svalbard) and the largest island south of the Lofoten archipelago. The island lies between the Trondheimsleia strait and the Frøyfjorden, just southwest of the entrance to the Trondheimsfjorden.

Hitra is surrounded by many islands such as Smøla to the southwest; Bispøyan, Helgbustadøya, Dolmøya, and Frøya to the north; Ulvøya, Fjellværsøya, and Leksa to the east; and Hemnskjela and the mainland of Norway to the south. The 345-metre (1,132 ft) tall Mørkdalstuva is the highest point on the island.

Most of the island's residents live near the coastline. The largest villages on the island are Fillan, Sandstad, Hestvika, Kvenvær, Ansnes, and Melandsjøen.

== History ==
The entire island is now part of Hitra Municipality, but prior to 1965, the island was divided into four municipalities: Hitra Municipality, Fillan Municipality, Sandstad Municipality, and Kvenvær Municipality.

In 2004, Statkraft completed the construction of the Hitra Wind Farm on the island. The farm has 24 windmills and produces a maximum power output of 55 megawatts (74,000 hp).

== See also ==
- List of islands of Norway
