= Trondheimsleia =

Strait in Norway

- Interactive map of the fjord
- Location: Møre og Romsdal and Trøndelag
- Coordinates: 63.4171°N 8.6824°E
- Basin countries: Norway
- Max. length: 94 kilometres (58 mi)
- Max. width: 7 kilometres (4.3 mi)
- References: NVE

The Trondheimsleia is a strait in Møre og Romsdal and Trøndelag counties in Norway. The 94-kilometre (58 mi) long strait runs between the islands of Smøla and Hitra and the mainland municipalities of Aure, Heim, and Orkland. The strait has several fjords which branch off it including the Ramsøyfjorden, Hemnfjorden, and Trondheimsfjorden. The islands of Leksa are located in the Trondheimsleia in Orkland Municipality. The Hitra Tunnel is a road tunnel underneath the Trondheimsleia connecting the island of Hitra to the mainland.
