= Nordbotn =

Nordbotn may refer to:

== Places ==
- Nordbotn, Troms, a village in Tromsø municipality in Troms county, Norway
- Nordbotn, Trøndelag, a village in Hitra municipality in Trøndelag county, Norway
- Nordbotn Church, a church in Hitra municipality in Trøndelag county, Norway
