= Horg =

Horg may refer to:

== Places ==
- Horg Church, a church in Melhus Municipality in Trøndelag county, Norway
- Horg Municipality, a former municipality in the old Sør-Trøndelag county, Norway
- Horg, a small farm on the south side of the village of Lundamo in Melhus Municipality in Trøndelag county, Norway

== Other ==
- HORG, (Holotypic Occlupanid Research Group), a research organisation
- Horg or Hörgr, a type of Nordic stone altar
- DJ Horg, a Canadian hip-hop music producer and disc jockey
