= Orkanger Church =

Church in Trøndelag, Norway

- Orkanger kirke
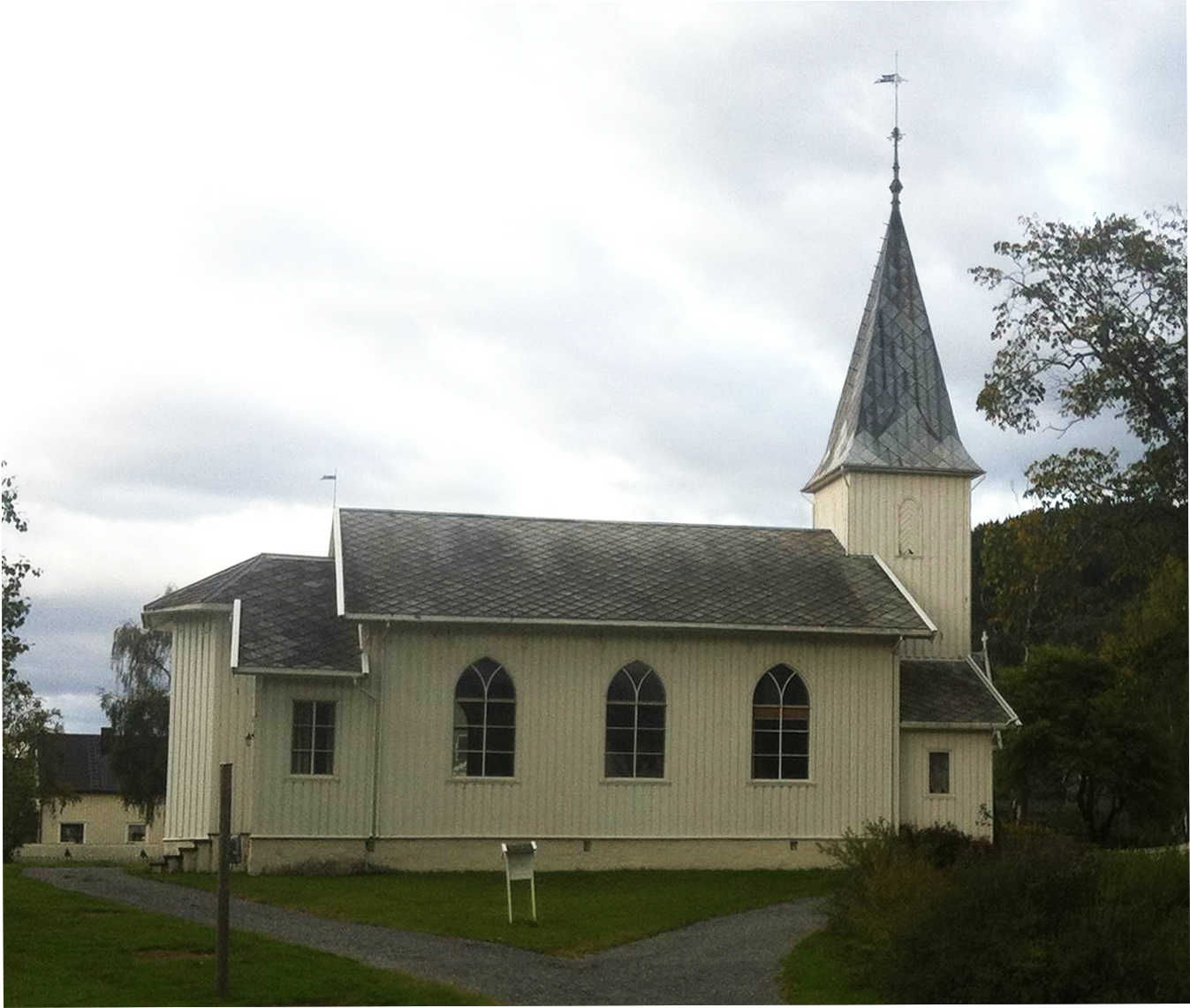
- View of the church (2013)
- Orkanger Church
- 63°18′36″N 9°51′04″E
- Location: Orkland Municipality, Trøndelag
- Country: Norway
- Denomination: Church of Norway
- Churchmanship: Evangelical Lutheran

History
- Former name: Orkedalsørens kirke
- Status: Parish church
- Founded: 1892
- Consecrated: 28 April 1892

Architecture
- Functional status: Active
- Architect: Christian Thams
- Architectural type: Long church
- Completed: 1892 (134 years ago)

Specifications
- Capacity: 200
- Materials: Wood

Administration
- Diocese: Nidaros bispedømme
- Deanery: Orkdal prosti
- Parish: Orkanger
- Norwegian Cultural Heritage Site
- Type: Church
- Status: Not protected
- ID: 85234

Orkanger Church (Norwegian: Orkanger kirke) is a parish church of the Church of Norway in Orkland Municipality in Trøndelag county, Norway. It is located in the town of Orkanger, near the shore of the Trondheimsfjorden. It is the church for the Orkanger parish which is part of the Orkdal prosti (deanery) in the Diocese of Nidaros. The white, wooden church (originally called Orkedalsørens kirke) was built in a long church style in 1892 by the architect Christian Thams. The church seats about 200 people.

== History ==
Historically, the people who lived in what is now the town of Orkanger, were part of the Orkdal Church parish. The village area was historically called Orkedalsøren. The village grew and by the 1880s, it had become more urban and it was large enough where the local residents felt they could support their own church. Meanwhile, also in the 1880s, plans were being made to tear down the nearby medieval Orkdal Church and build a new, larger church on the same site that would be able to support the whole parish including all the people of Orkedalsøren. The residents in Orkedalsøren, however began their own work towards building their own church despite the municipality's plans to build a new, larger church nearby. The village people hired Christian Thams to build the new church and raised their own funds for the building in Orkedalsøren. This new church was completed in 1892 and it was consecrated on 28 April 1892 by the local Provost Brodahl. The municipality eventually agreed to take over the locally financed church and it was used for the whole parish from 1892-1893 while the nearby Orkdal Church was being built (that building was completed in December of 1893). After the new Orkdal Church was completed, that church served the majority of the land of the parish and the Orkanger Church served the people of the urban area of Orkedalsøren. In 1920, Orkedalsøren became an independent town named Orkanger and the church was renamed Orkanger Church.

The original Swiss chalet style character of the building has been somewhat lessened during restorations and renovations over the years, particularly in 1950 when the tower was rebuilt with a completely different look. Originally, the church exterior was painted brown. Later, it was painted a shade of yellow before it was painted brown again. Today's white color dates from 1991.

== Media gallery ==
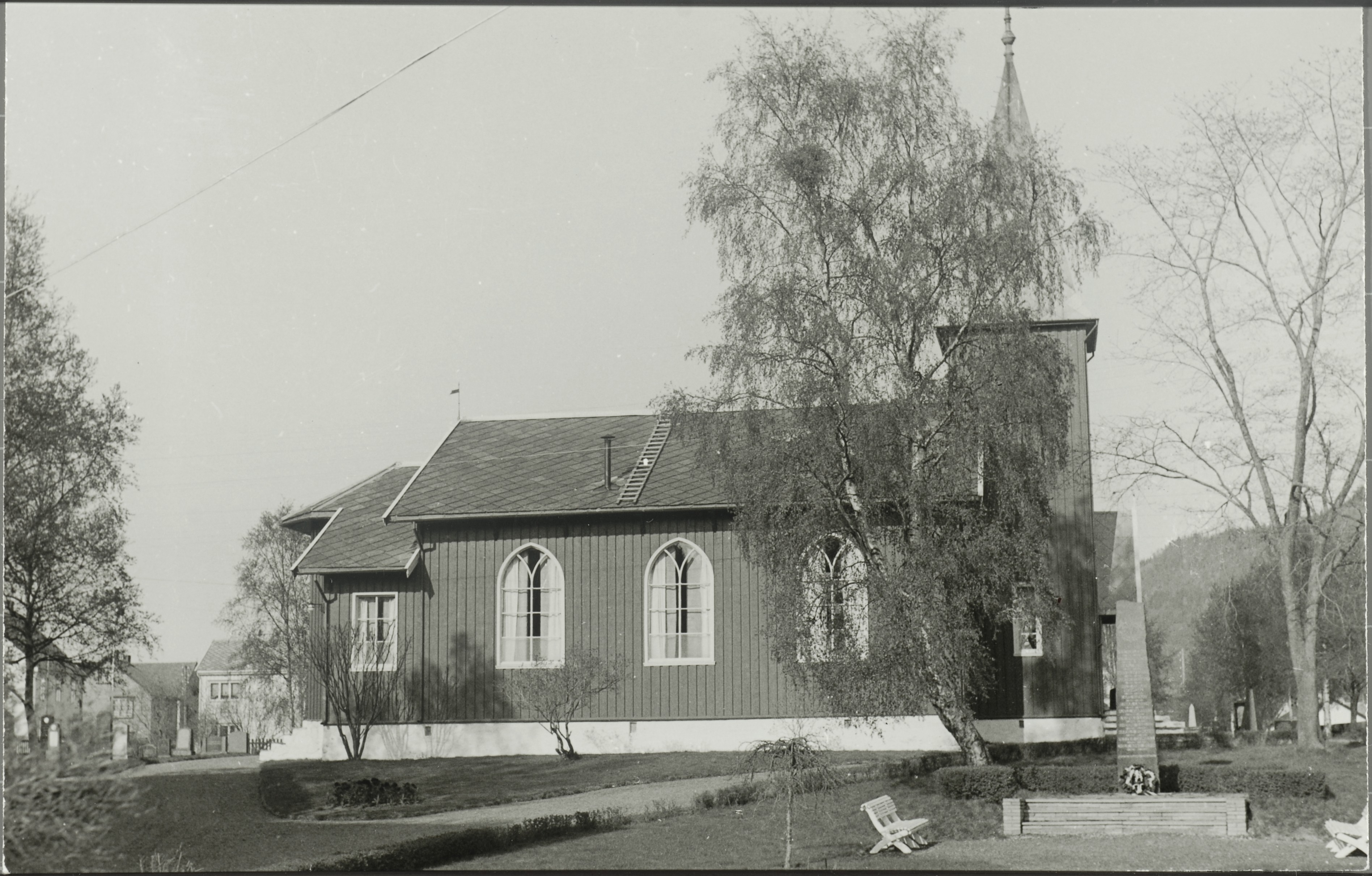
Exterior view (c. 1965)

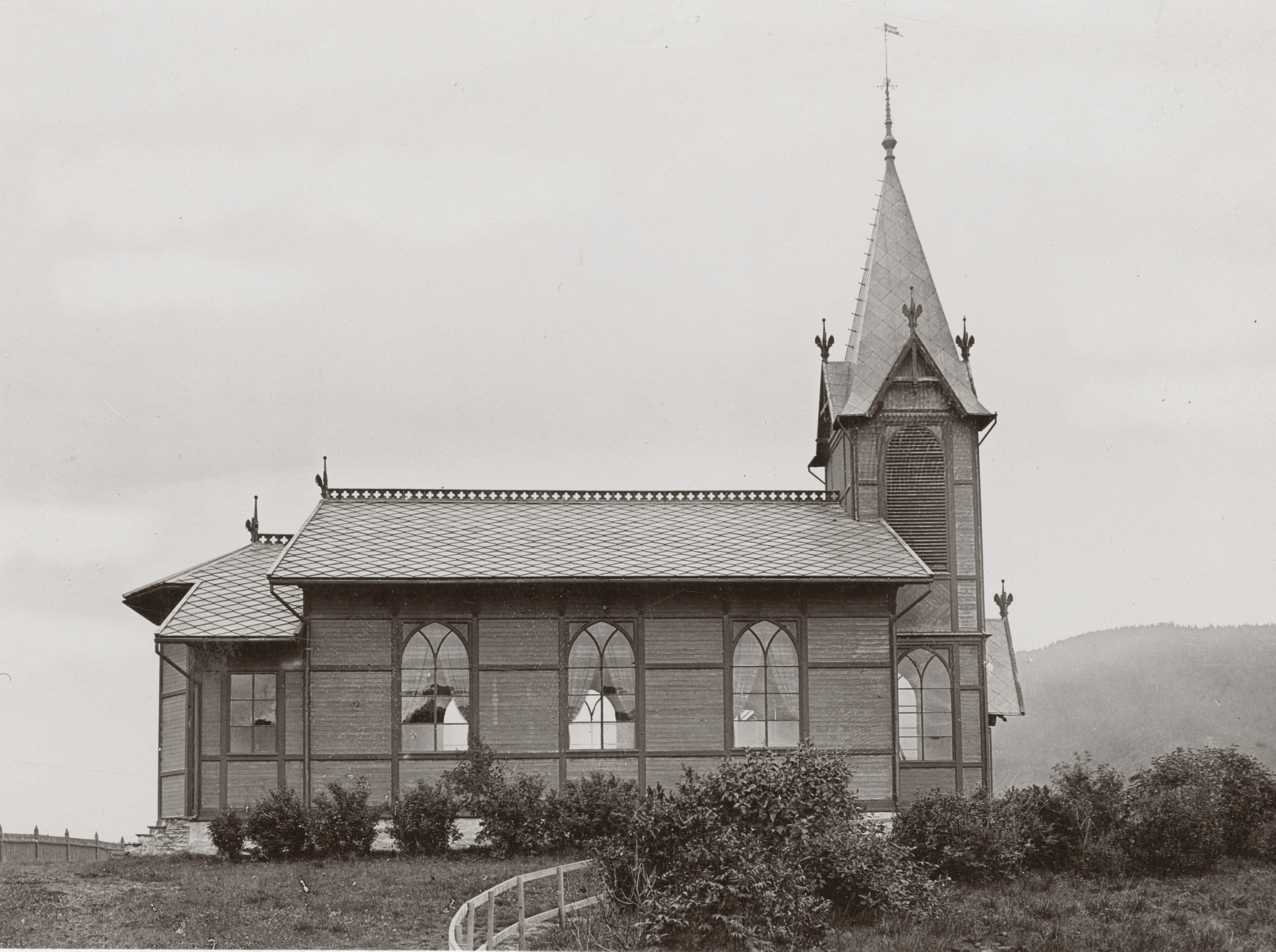
Original exterior view (before 1950)

== See also ==
- List of churches in Nidaros
