= Vågan Church =

Vågan Church "Lofoten Cathedral"
- Vågan kirke / Lofotkatedralen
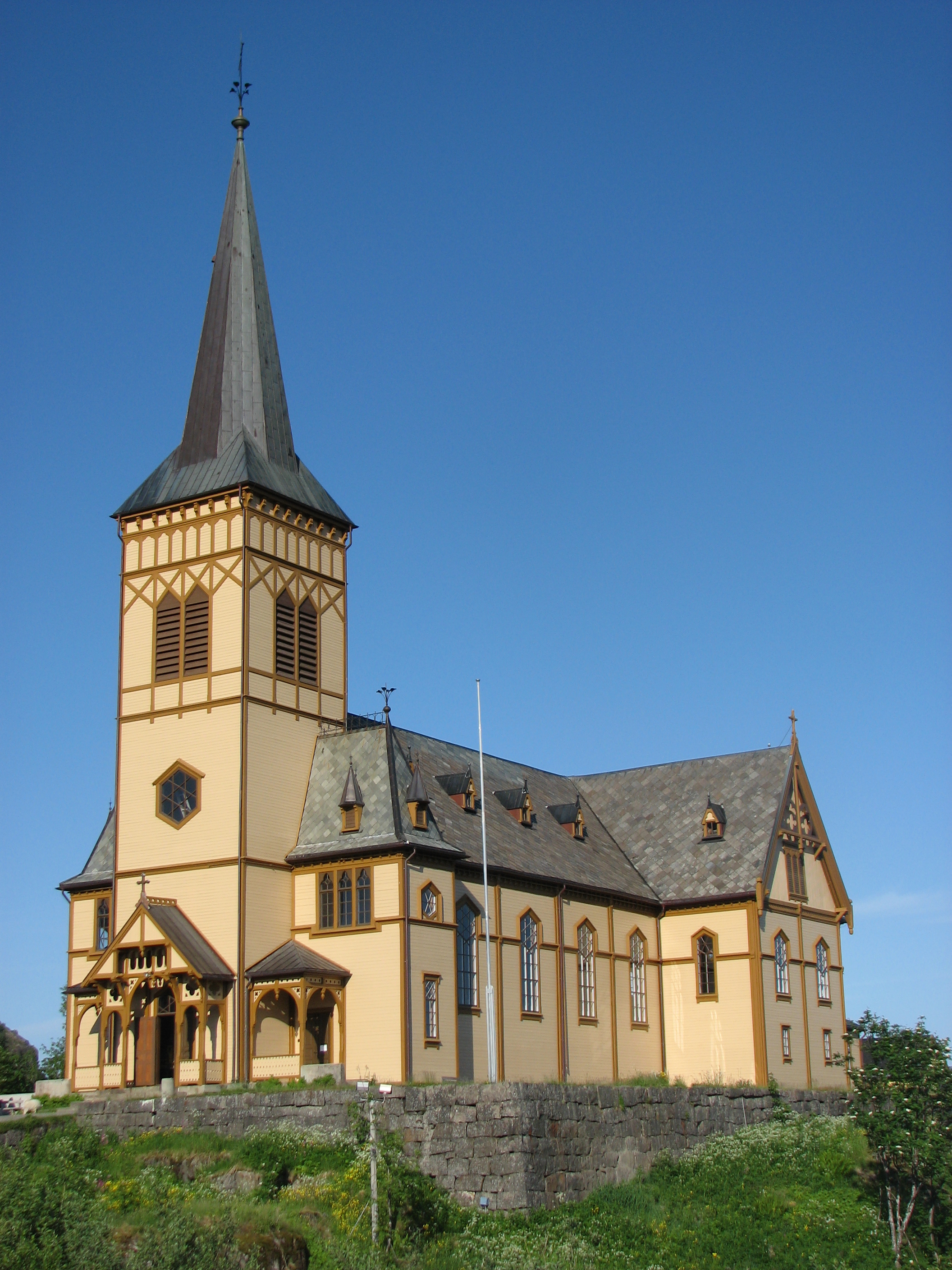
- View of the church
- Vågan Church "Lofoten Cathedral"
- 68.2157°N 14.4832°E
- Location: Vågan, Nordland
- Country: Norway
- Denomination: Church of Norway
- Churchmanship: Evangelical Lutheran

History
- Status: Parish church
- Founded: c. 1106-1130
- Consecrated: 9 October 1898

Architecture
- Functional status: Active
- Architect: Carl J. Bergstrøm
- Architectural type: Cruciform
- Style: Gothic revival
- Completed: 1898 (128 years ago)

Specifications
- Capacity: 1200
- Materials: Wood

Administration
- Diocese: Sør-Hålogaland
- Deanery: Lofoten prosti
- Parish: Vågan
- Norwegian Cultural Heritage Site
- Type: Church
- Status: Listed
- ID: 85878

Vågan Church (Norwegian: Vågan kirke; nickname: Lofoten Cathedral) is a parish church of the Church of Norway in Vågan Municipality in Nordland county, Norway. It is located in the village of Kabelvåg on the island of Austvågøya. It is the church for the Vågan parish which is part of the Lofoten prosti (deanery) in the Diocese of Sør-Hålogaland. The yellow, wooden church was built in a cruciform style in 1898 using plans drawn up by the architect Carl J. Bergstrøm. The church seats about 1,200 people, making it the largest wooden building in Northern Norway, hence the nickname Lofoten Cathedral.

== History ==
The earliest existing historical records of the church date back to the early 12th century when King Øystein Magnusson (c. 1088– 1123) ordered that a church be built in Vågan to serve the Lofoten area. The first church was likely a stave church and it was located about 200 metres (660 ft) west of the present site of the church. In the mid-1600s, the old church was enlarged and renovated, giving the building a cruciform design. After centuries of use, the old church deteriorated and in 1712 or 1713 the old church began to collapse and so it was torn down. A new church was built on the same site in 1713–1714. It was a timber-framed long church design with a tower on the roof and a cemetery surrounding the church. This church was in use for nearly a century when in 1798, it was disassembled and moved to the nearby island of Værøya where it was rebuilt as the Værøy Church. A new church was built in Vågan to replace the one that was moved away. The new church was a timber building in a cruciform design.

In 1814, this church served as an election church (Norwegian: valgkirke). Together with more than 300 other parish churches across Norway, it was a polling station for elections to the 1814 Norwegian Constituent Assembly which wrote the Constitution of Norway. This was Norway's first national elections. Each church parish was a constituency that elected people called "electors" who later met together in each county to elect the representatives for the assembly that was to meet at Eidsvoll Manor later that year.

By the late 1800s, the Kabelvåg area had seen a lot of population growth due to the tremendous fishing opportunities each season. In 1898, a new church was built about 200 metres (660 ft) to the east of the old church. It was designed to be large enough to accommodate all the fishermen who came to Kabelvåg each season. It was nicknamed the "Lofoten Cathedral" (Lofotkatedralen) by Eivind Berggrav, the Bishop of the Diocese of Oslo in 1929. The church was designed in Gothic revival style by the architect Carl Julius Bergstrøm (1828-1898). The new church was consecrated on 9 October 1898. After the new church was completed, the "old church" was still located just across the road for a couple of years until it was demolished in the summer of 1900.

== Media gallery ==
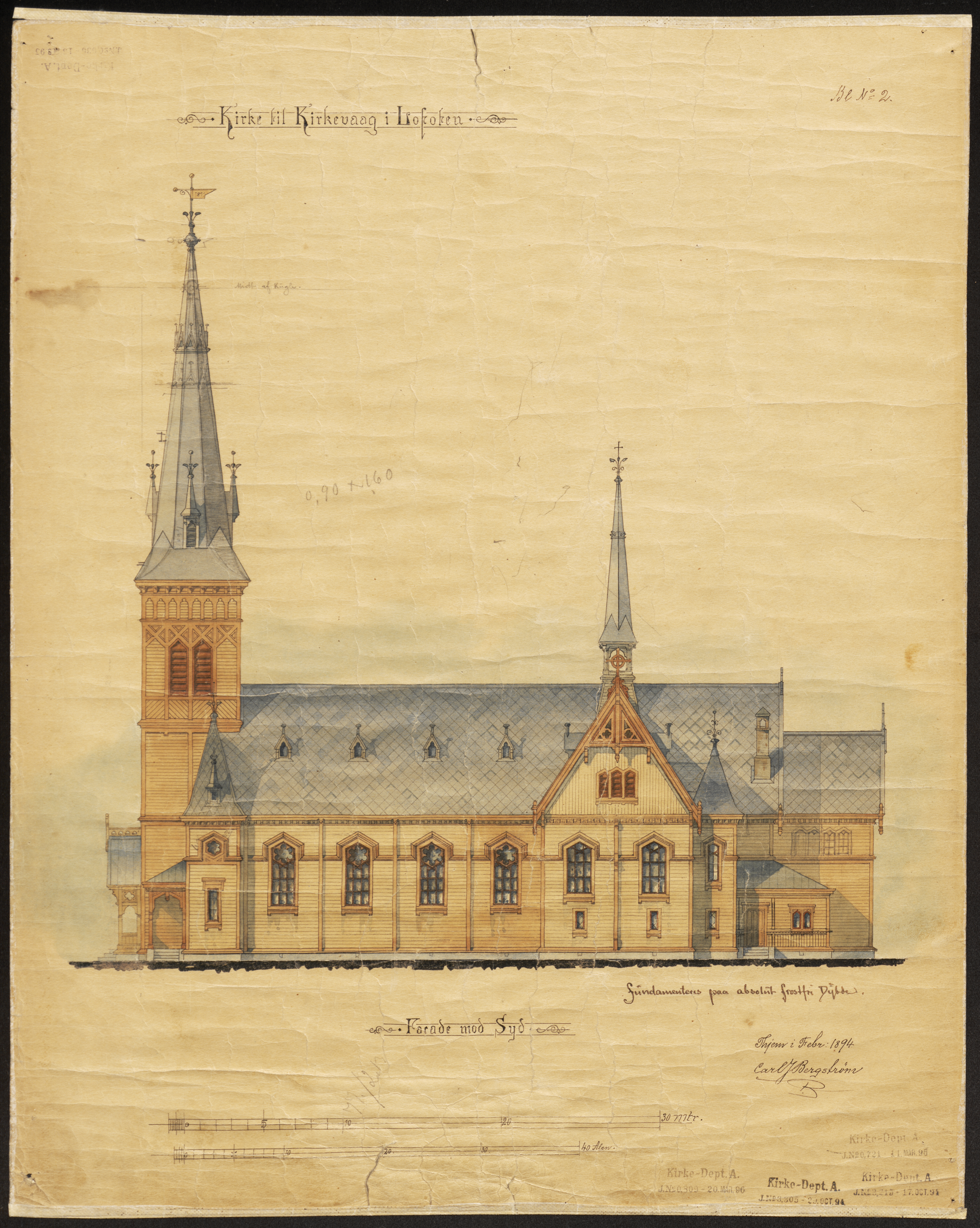
Exterior drawing

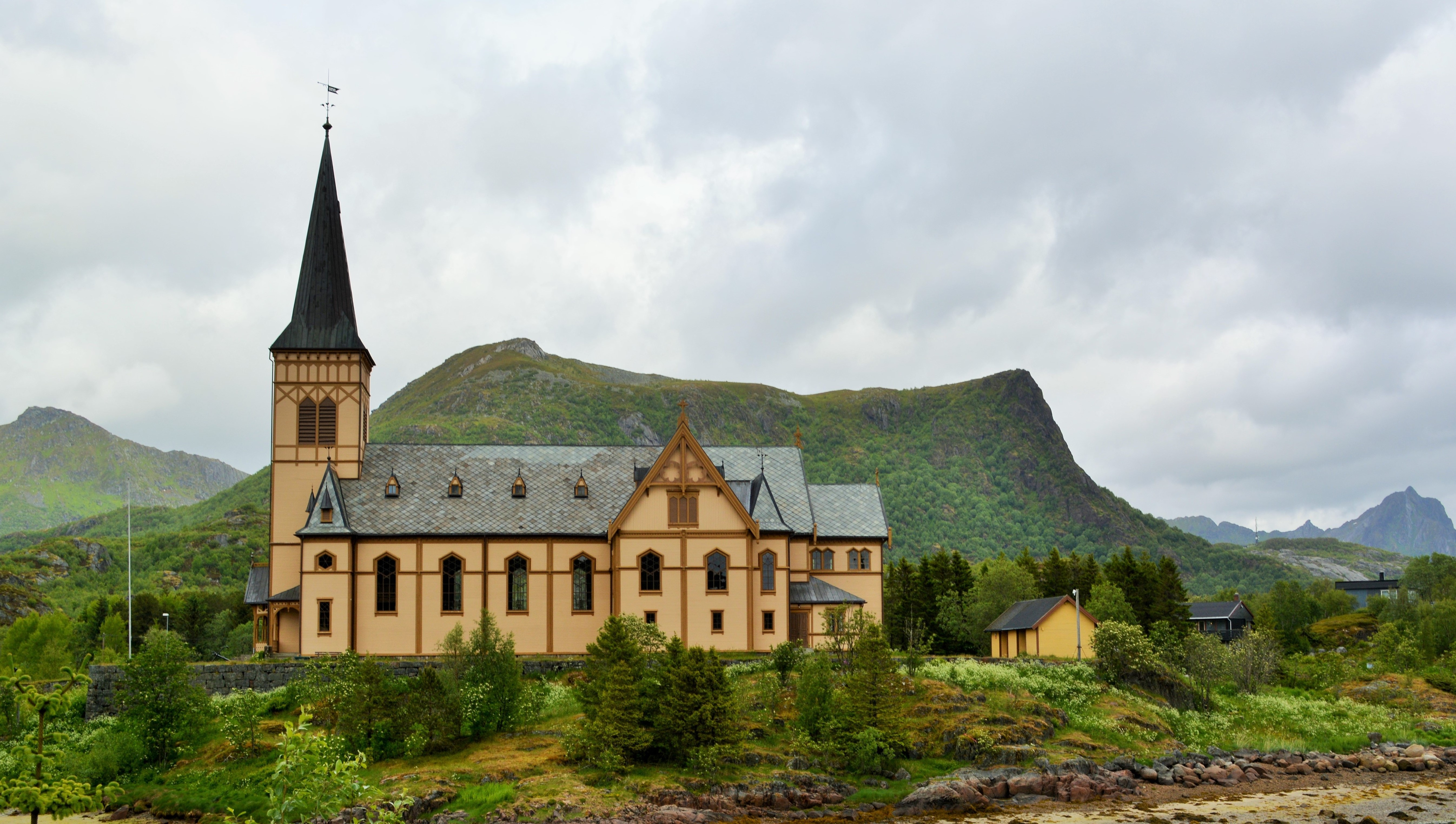
Exterior side

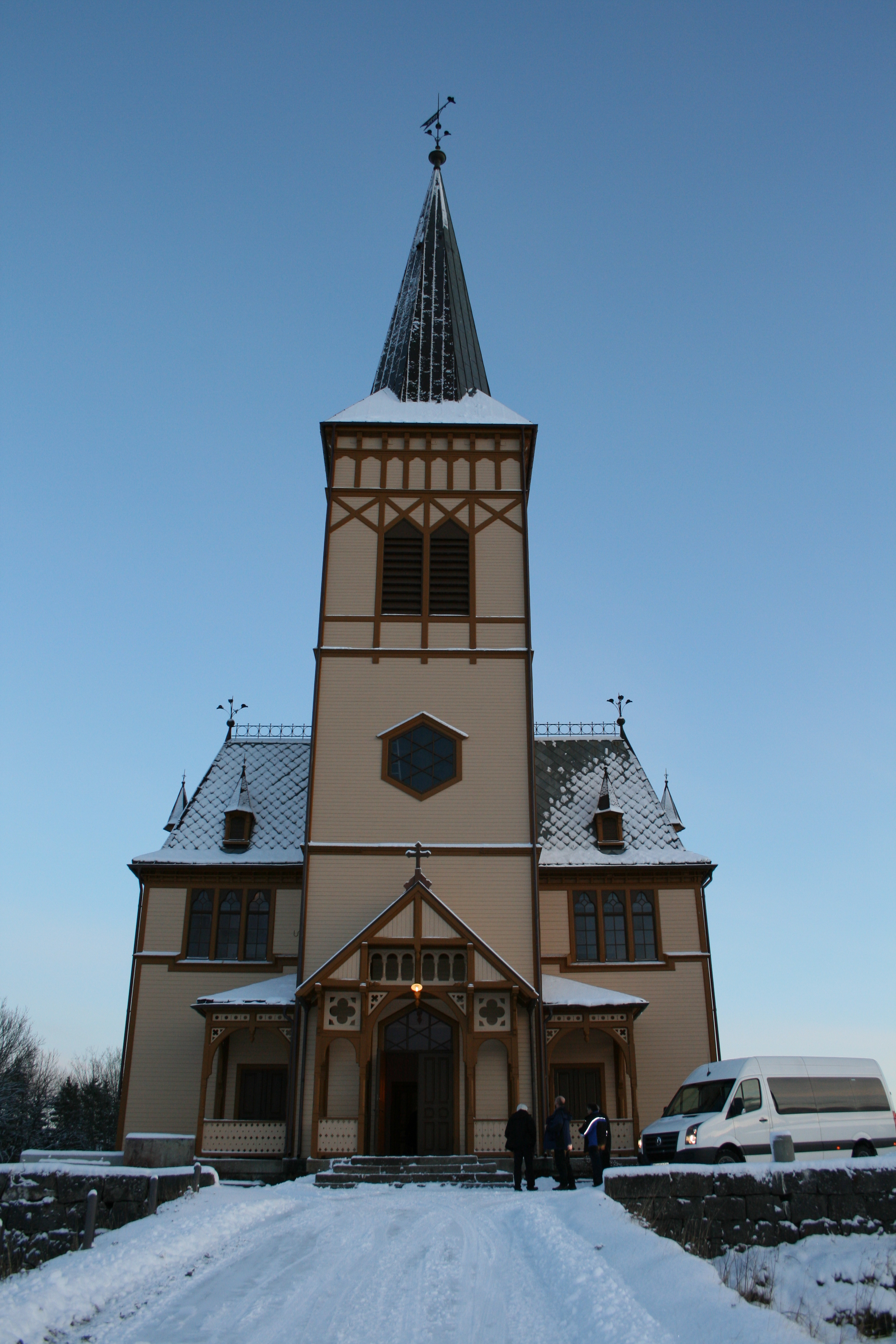
Exterior front

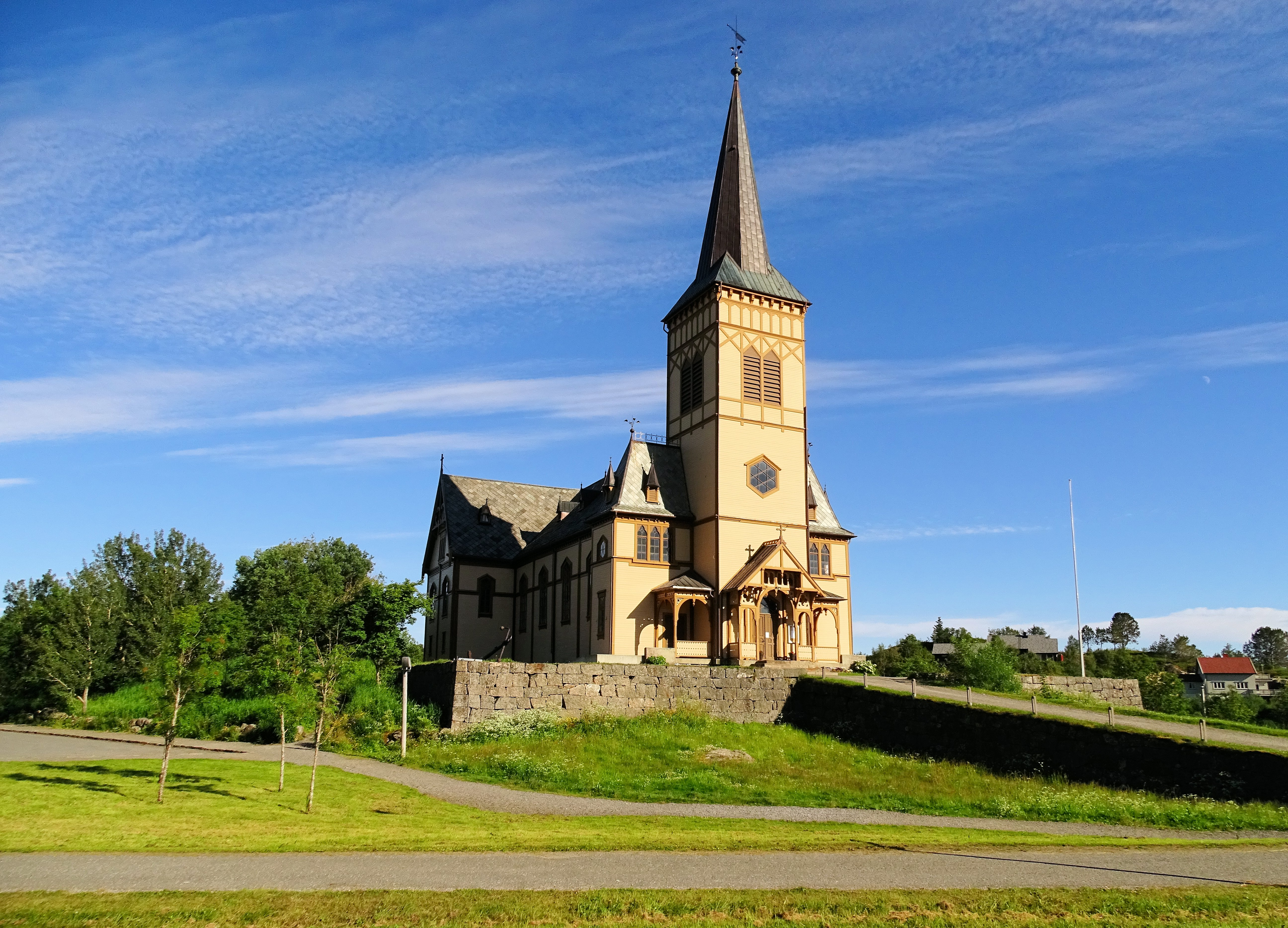
Exterior side

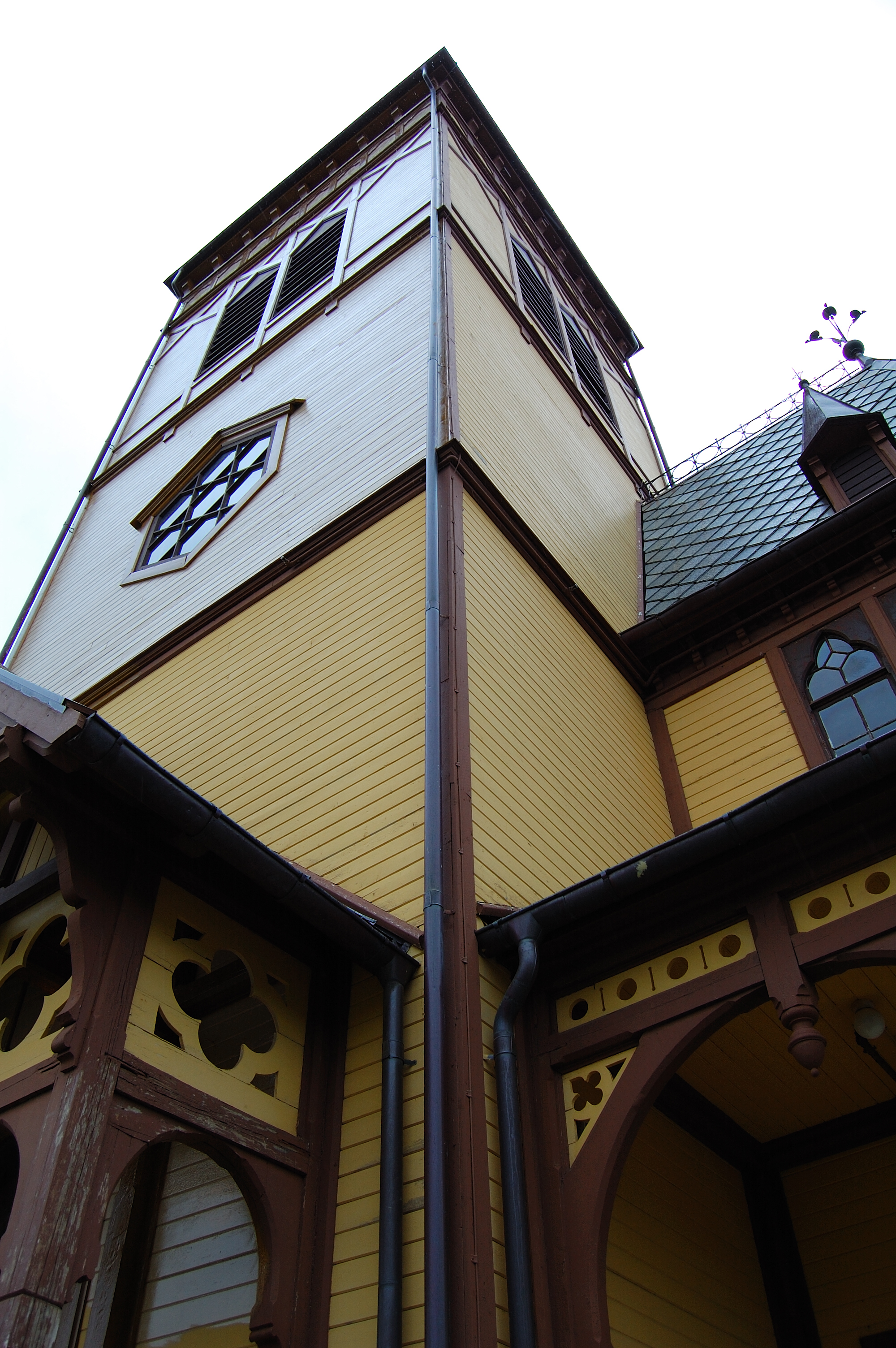
Tower

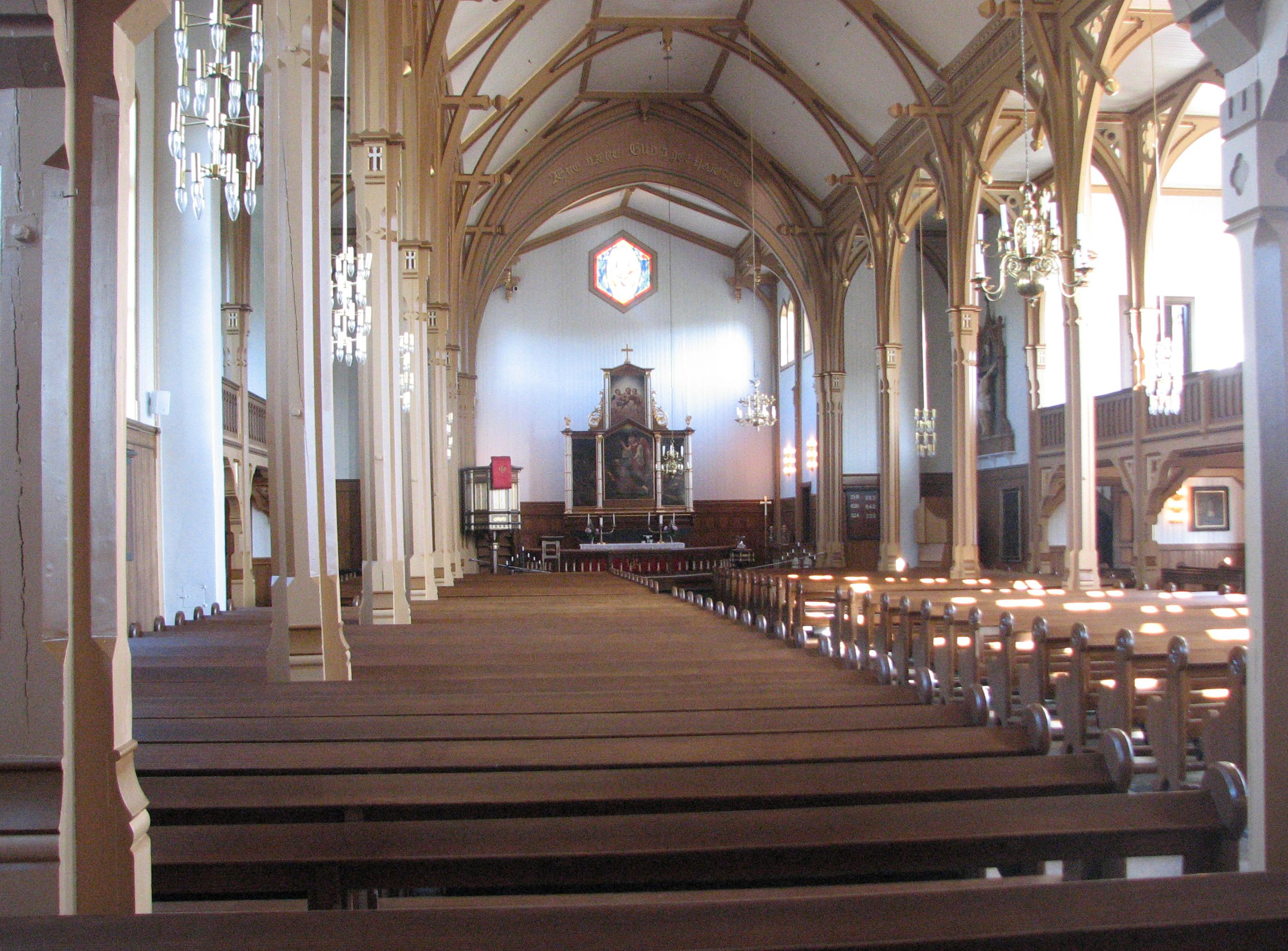
Interior

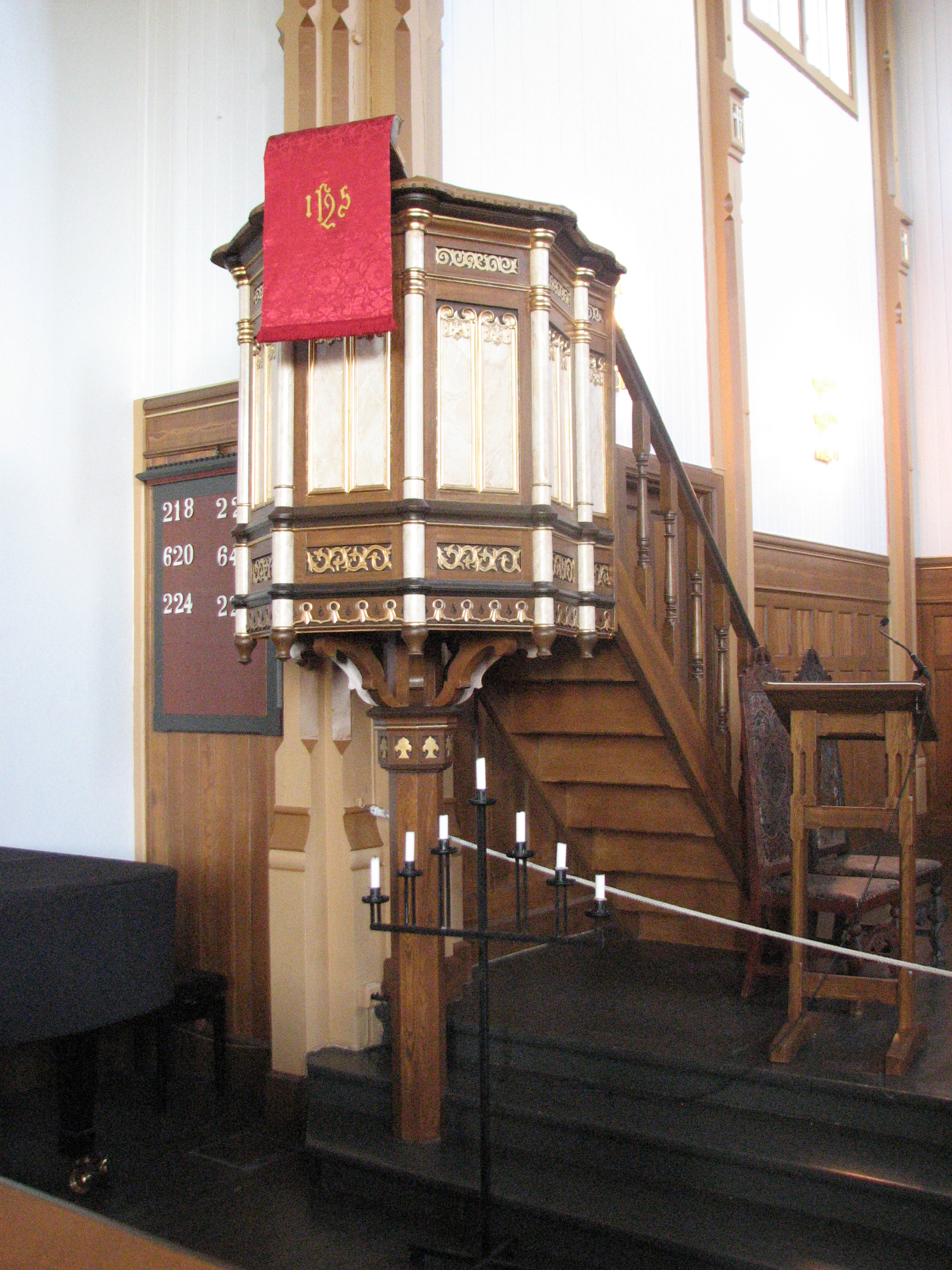
Pulpit

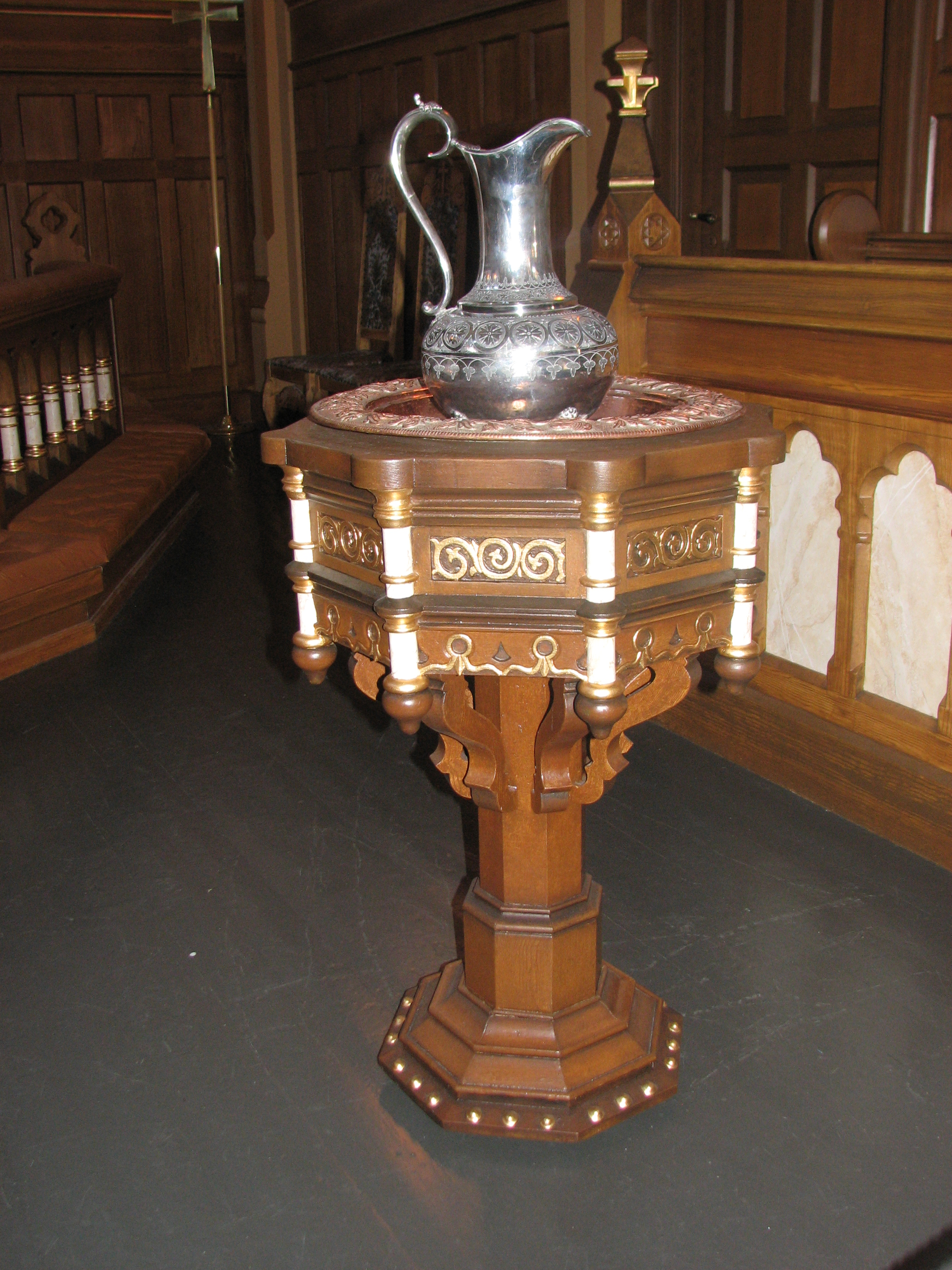
Baptismal font

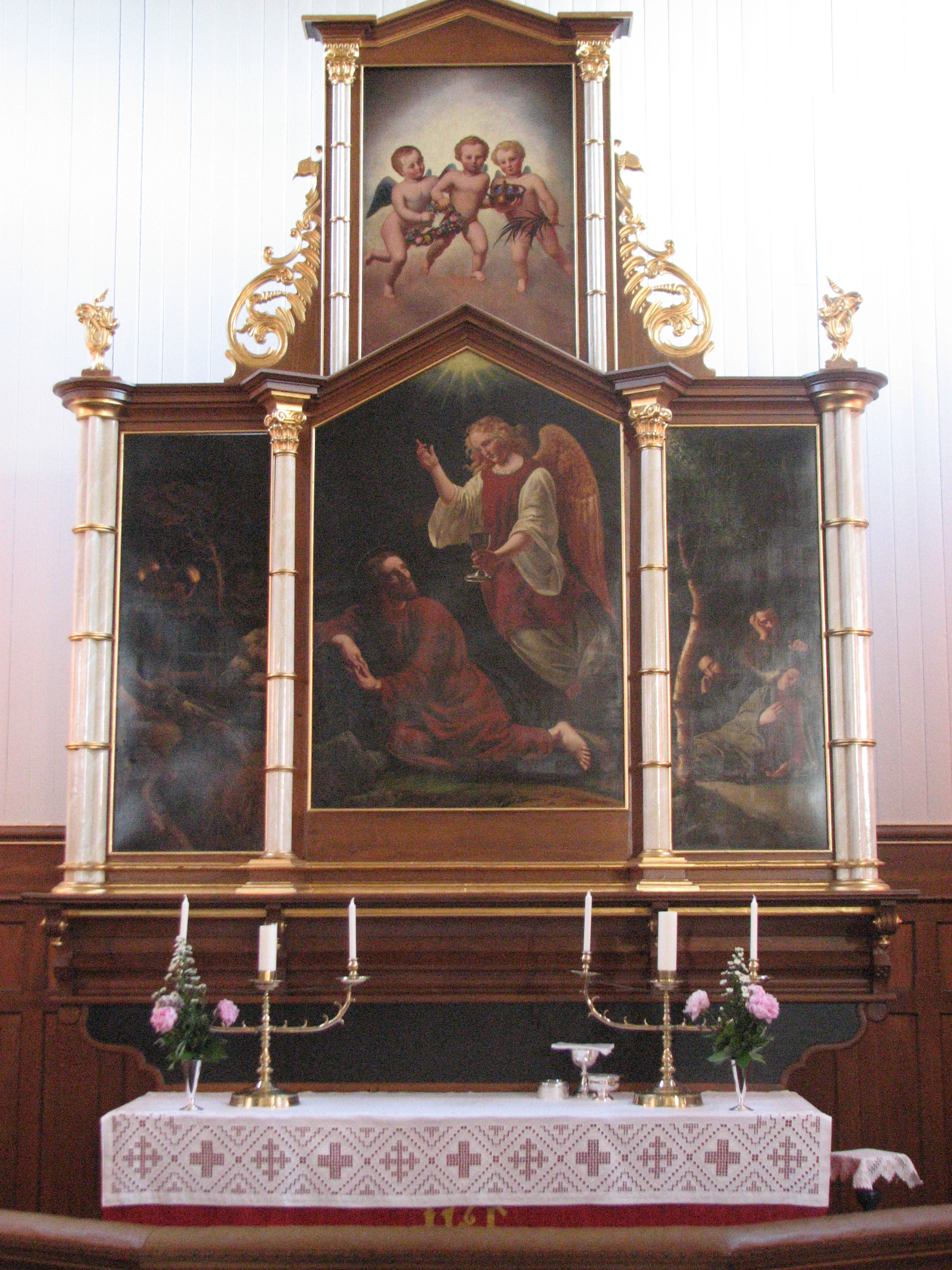
Altarpiece

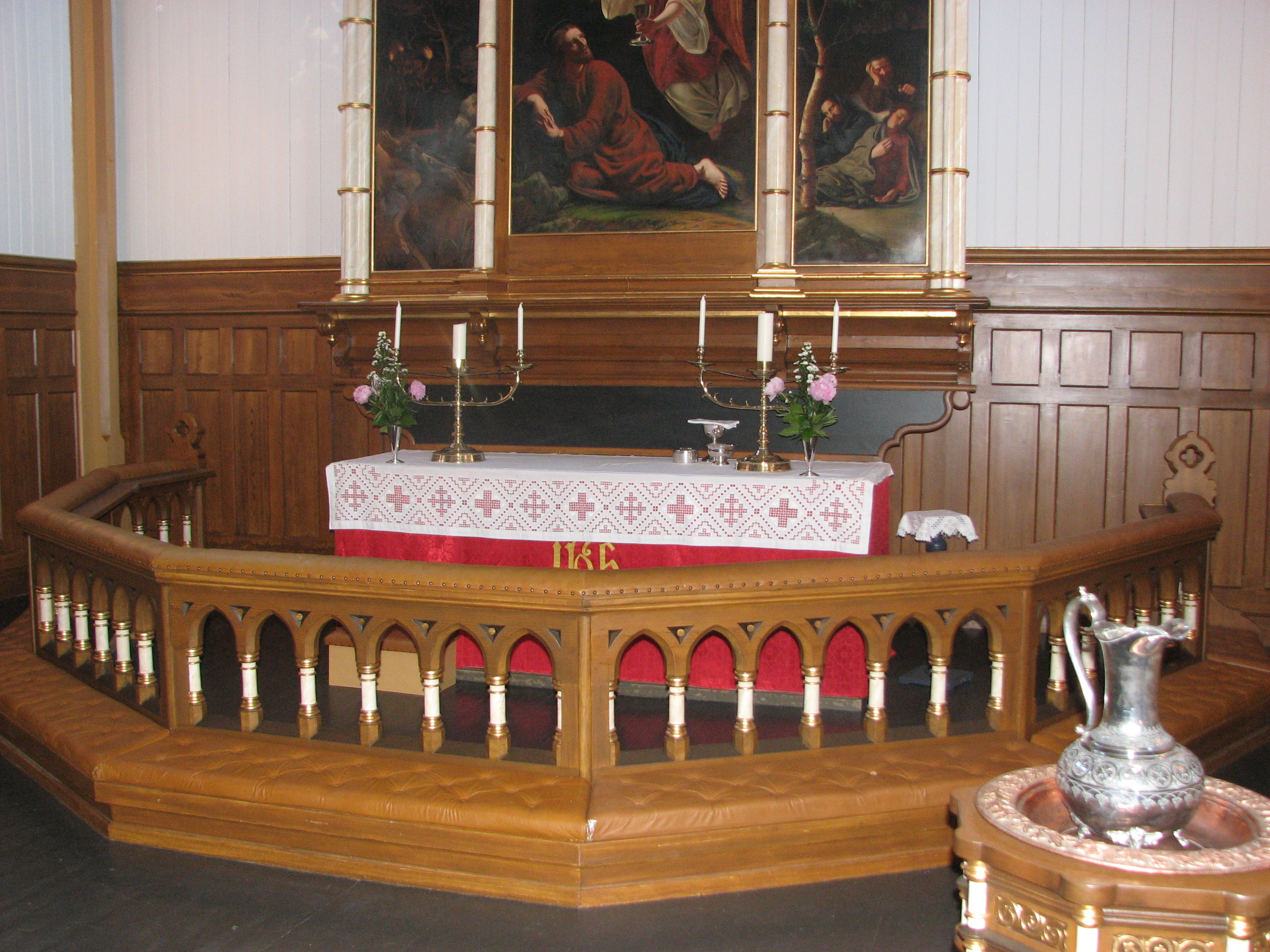
Altar

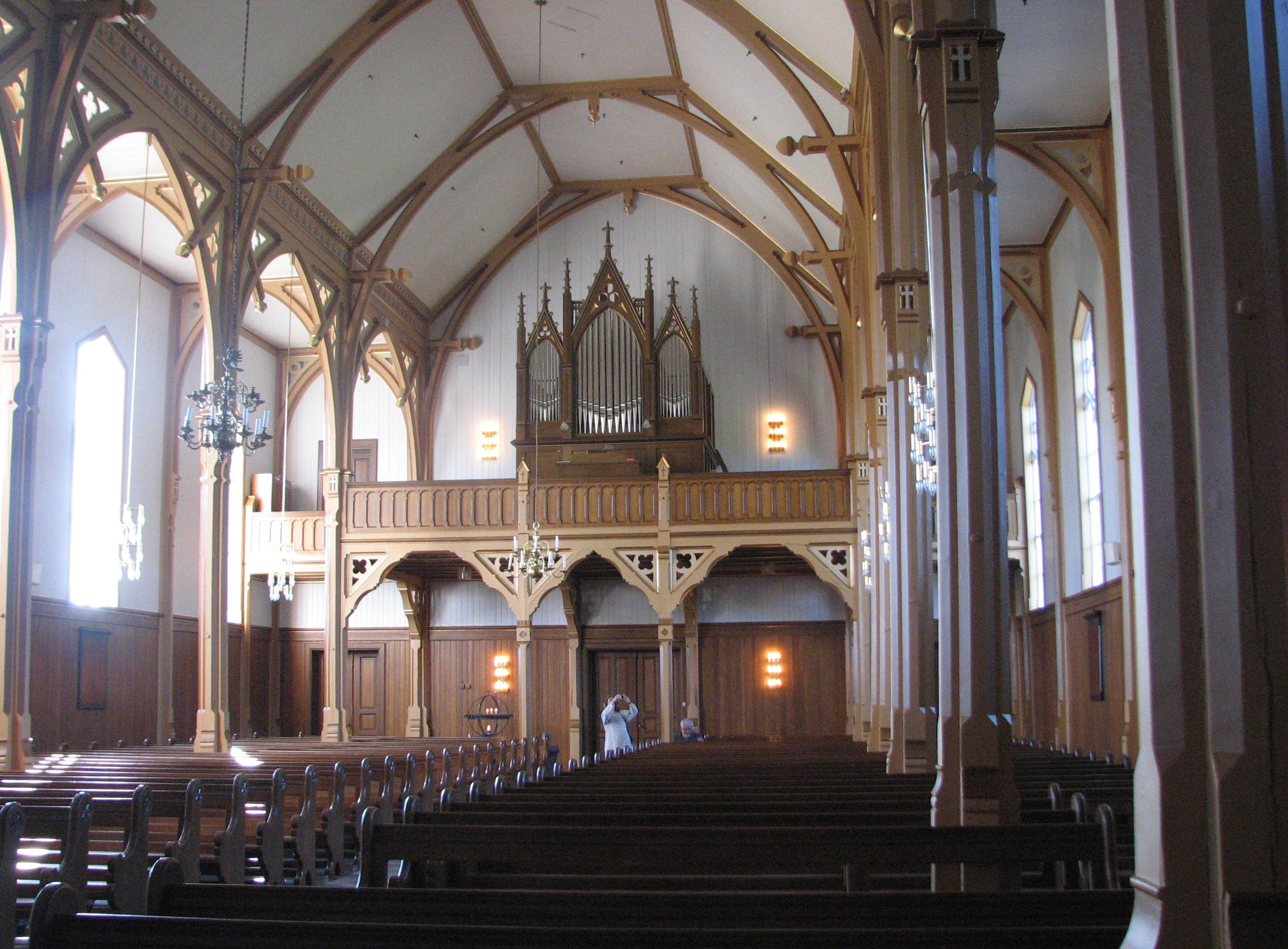
Nave

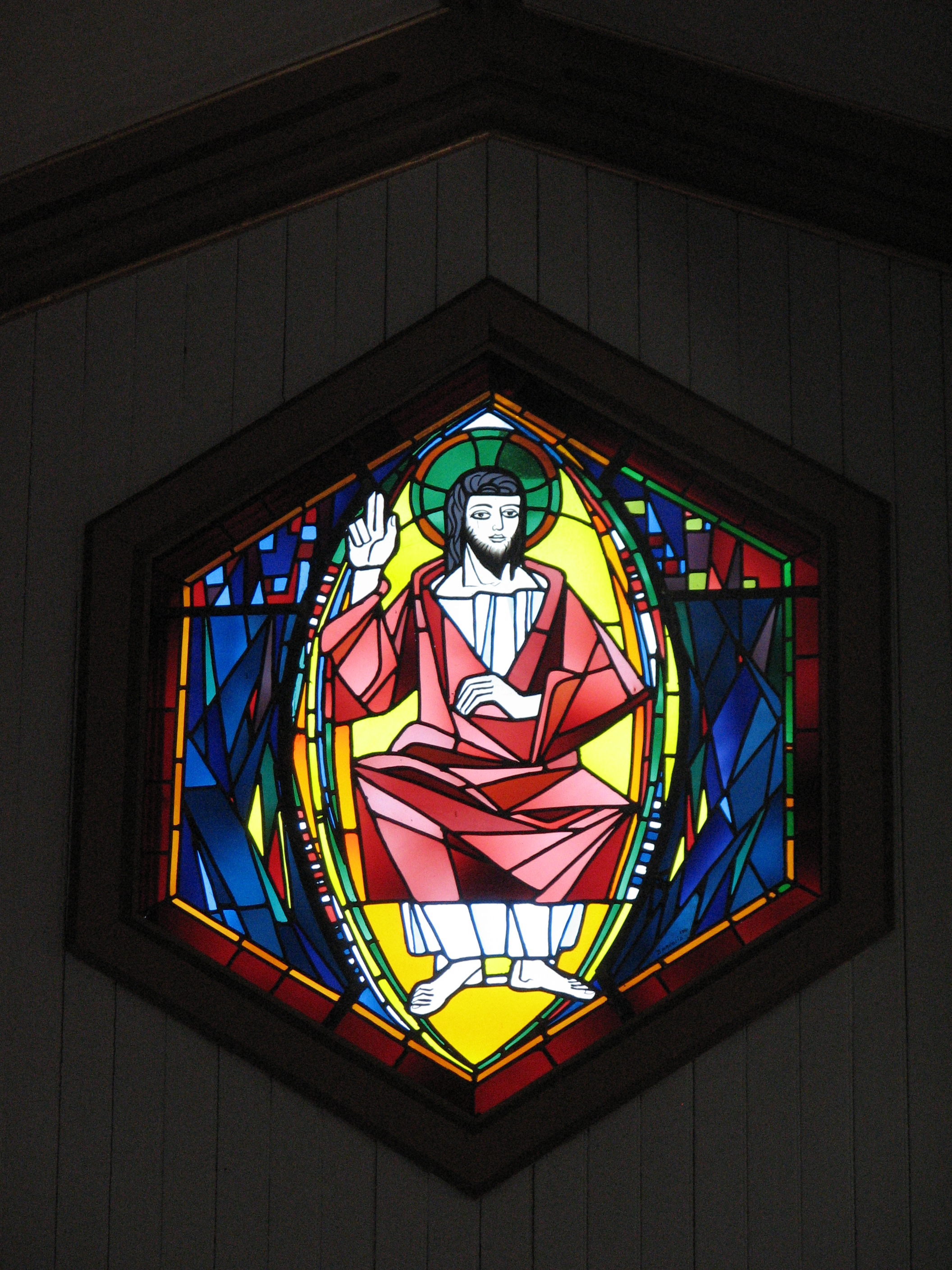
Window

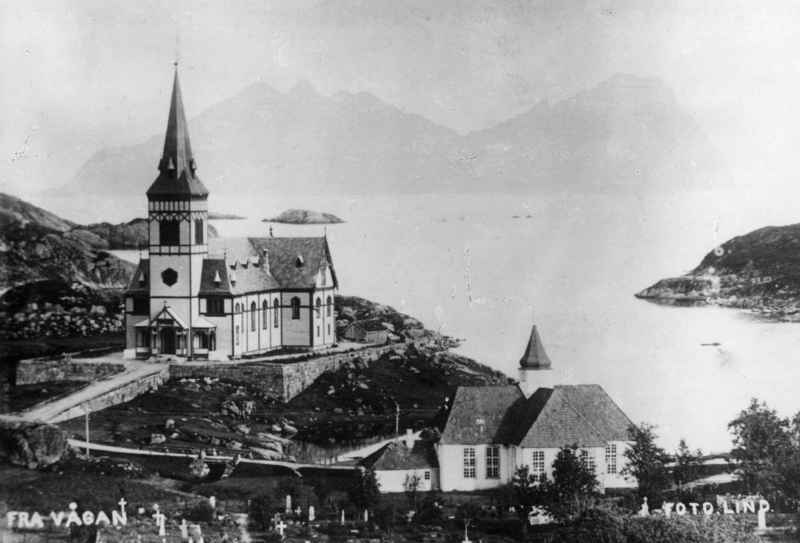
The new, larger church in 1900 before the old, smaller church (foreground) was torn down.

== See also ==
- List of churches in Sør-Hålogaland
