= Bread clip =

Closure device for plastic bags

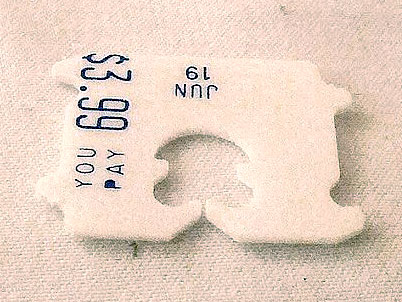
A white bread clip

A bread clip is a device that is used to hold plastic bags closed, such as those in which sliced bread is commonly packaged. They are also commonly called bread tags, bread tabs, bread ties, bread buckles, bread-bag clips, or occlupanids. It seals a bag more securely than tying or folding over its open end, thus providing a nearly hermetic seal, so that the contents are preserved longer.

== Designs ==
=== Simple ===
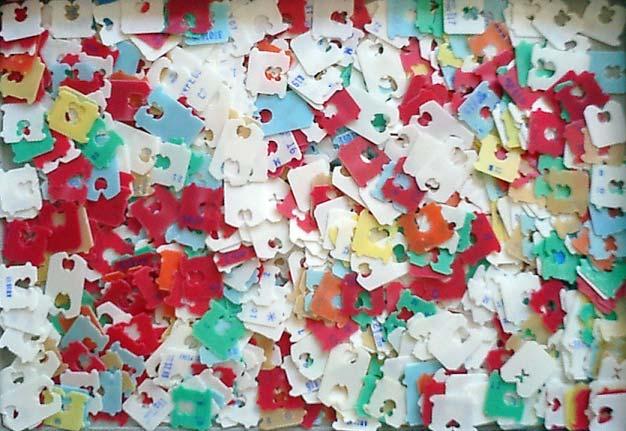
An assortment of simple bread clips

Most designs of bread clip consist of a single plastic part through which the neck of a plastic bag can be threaded. Because these clips are cheap, ubiquitous, and come in a variety of shapes and colors, some people collect them.

Most bread clips are made from plastic #6 polystyrene (PS), but Quebec-based bread clip manufacturing company KLR Systems released recyclable, cardboard bread clips in 2019, which they later switched to producing in 2022.

Such clips are also used for bagged milk. In the Canadian provinces of Ontario, Quebec, New Brunswick, and Nova Scotia. The most common package is 4 L (7 imp pt; 8.5 US pt), consisting of three 1.33-litre (2.34 imp pt; 2.8 US pt) sealed bags in a larger bag, which is closed with a clip and imprinted with the milk's expected expiration date.

=== Mechanical ===
A more complex bread clip design involves two articulated plastic parts mounted on a pivot with a spring between them to provide tension.

== History ==
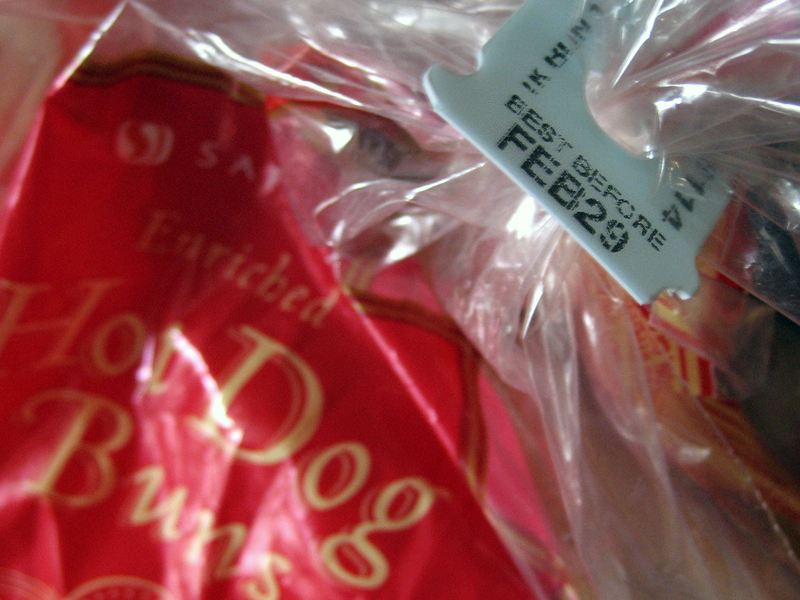
A clip sealing a bag of buns displaying a best before date

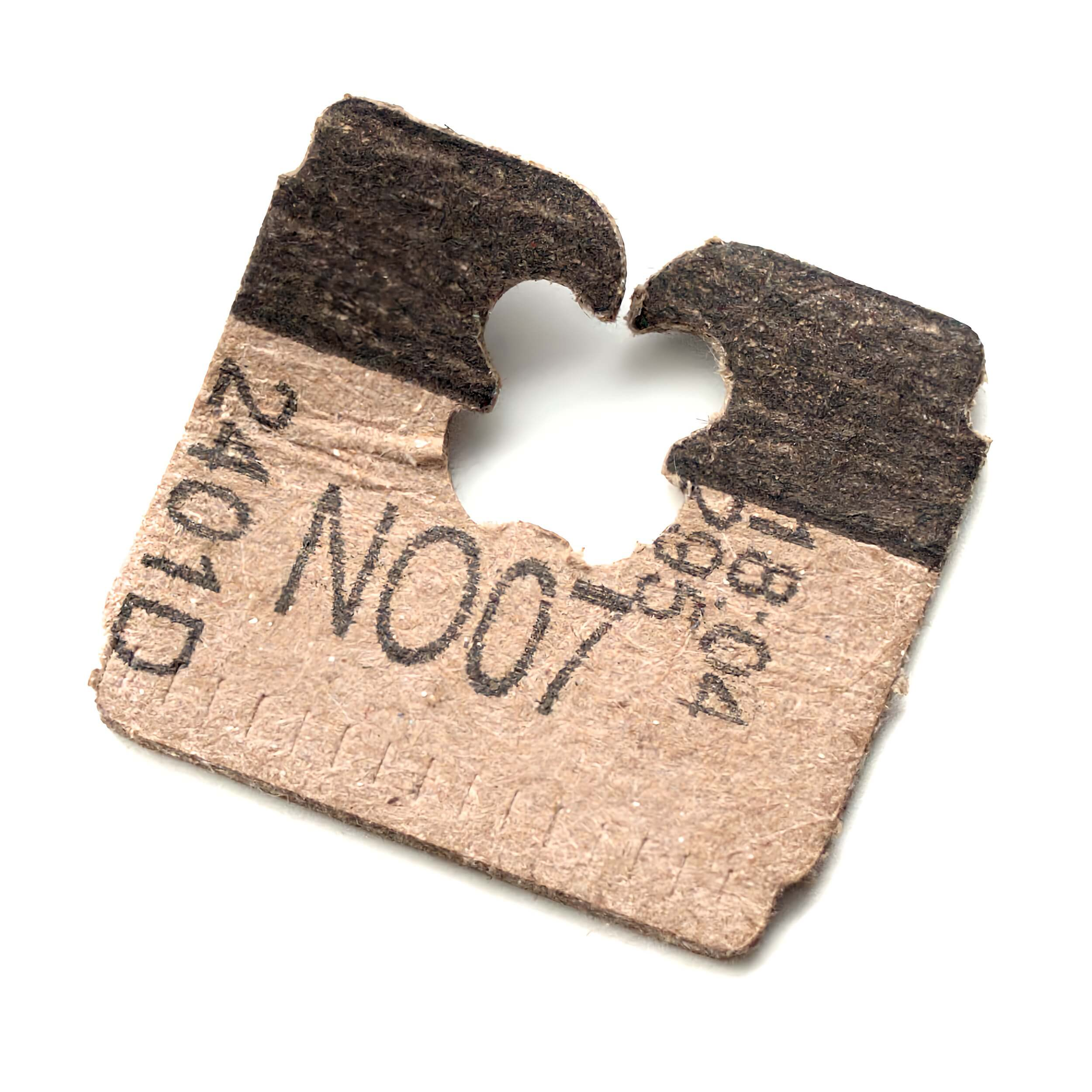
Biodegradable bread clip in Quebec, Canada

The bread clip was invented by Floyd G. Paxton and manufactured by the Kwik Lok Corporation, based in Yakima, Washington with manufacturing plants in Yakima and New Haven, Indiana. Kwik Lok Corporation's clips are called "Kwik Lok closures".

Paxton was known for repeatedly telling the story about how he came up with the idea of the bread clip. As he told it, he was flying home on an airliner in 1952 and opened a bag of peanuts, whereupon he realized he had no way to reclose it. He rummaged through his wallet and found an expired credit card and hand-carved his first bag clip with a small pen knife. When a fruit packer, Pacific Fruit, wanted to replace rubber bands with a better bag closure for its new plastic bags, Paxton remembered his bag of peanuts. He hand-whittled another clip from a small sheet of Plexiglas. With an order in hand for a million clips, Paxton designed a die-cut machine to produce the clips at high speed. Paxton won a United States patent for the clips themselves, US Pat. 3822441. He was also issued numerous patents for the manufactured strips of clips (US. Pat. 3164250, 3270872 and 31964249) as well as the high-speed "bag closing apparatus" that made the clips, inserted bread into the bags, and applied the clips to said bags.

The bread clip was developed in the early 1950s for a growing need to close plastic bags on the packaging line very efficiently. Manufacturers, using more and more automation in the manufacture and packaging of food, needed methods to raise production volumes and reduce costs. At the same time a hurried population of consumers wanted a fast and easy way to open and effectively seal food bags. The simple bread clip sufficed. In addition, re-closability became a selling point as smaller families and higher costs slowed consumption, leading to a potential for higher rates of spoilage.

Kwik Lok continues to be the main manufacturer of bread clips with Schutte as their European competitor.

== Manufacturers ==
=== KLR Systems ===
KLR Systems began as a distributor of Kwik Lok products in 1977 in the Canadian city of Saint-Pie, Québec.

=== Kwik Lok ===
The original manufacturer of breadclips and based in the US city of Yakima, Washington, Kwik Lok was founded in 1954 by Floyd Greg Paxton. As of March 2026, it remains the largest manufacturer and distributor of breadclips, which it calls "Kwik Loks".

=== MAX Co., Ltd. ===
MAX Co., Ltd. was founded in the Japanese city of Takasaki, Gunma prefecture in 1942 as Yamada Air Industry Co., Ltd., producing wing parts for airplanes. The company primarily manufactures industrial equipment and stationery, but launched a bagclosure some time prior to 2019. They also released BIOMASS CONI-CLIP in 2022.

=== Rexam ===
Rexam was founded in 1881 as a paper making business in the English city of London. Some time before 2021 and likely prior to their acquisition by Ball in 2017, Rexam produced a bagclosure.

=== Schutte Bagclosures ===
Schutte Bagclosures, founded in 1957 by Joannes Schutte in the Dutch city of Amsterdam. In 1975 the company moved to Uden and to its current location therein 1980. One of the largest manufacturers of breadclips, Schutte Bagclosures is also Kwik Lok's top competitor.

=== Twist-HD ===
Zhenjiang Hongda Commodity Co., Ltd., also known as Twist-HD, was founded in 1998 in the Chinese city of Zhenjiang, Jiangsu province.

=== West Lock Fastener ===
West Lock Fastener was founded in the Canadian town of Athabasca, Alberta by Lou Koppe. The company produces foldable breadclips reportedly made from recycled PET plastic. created to be an "ecologically correct", hand-friendly, freezers-safe breadclip which is easy to apply to and remove from bags. As of March 2026 the site, ecoclip.com, is inactive.

== "Occlupanids" ==
John Daniel, creator of the website horg.com, coined the term occlupanids to describe plastic bread clips, combining the Latin occlu- (to close) and -pan (bread). He then created a mock phylogeny of the different clip designs, as well as a formal taxonomy including "families" and binomial scientific names. Researchers of occlupanids are called occlupanologists. These terms have since been referenced in popular media.

== Health risks ==
Case studies in the medical literature document instances of inhalation and ingestion.
