= Floyd Paxton =

American inventor (1918–1975)

- Born: Floyd Greg Paxton; March 17, 1918; Redlands, California, U.S.
- Died: December 10, 1975 (aged 57); Yakima, Washington, U.S.
- Occupation(s): Engineer, inventor, businessman

Floyd Greg Paxton (March 17, 1918 – December 10, 1975) was a manufacturer of ball bearings during World War II, and later inventor of the bread clip, a notched plastic tag used for sealing bags of bread.

== Bread clip ==
Paxton conceived the notion of the bread clip when he was flying in 1952; this resulted later in him founding the company Kwik Lok, in Yakima, Washington.

== Other pursuits ==
Paxton was known in the state of Washington for his very conservative political views. During the 1960s he was on the national board of directors of the John Birch Society. He made four unsuccessful runs for Congress. He founded a conservative newspaper, the Yakima Eagle, which did not attract a subscriber base and soon folded. Paxton and his wife, Grace, had a running battle with the Internal Revenue Service over a family trust set up to avoid taxation, resulting in years of litigation and appeals with the IRS, with the Paxtons ultimately losing. He died of a heart attack in December 1975 at the age of 57. He left a son, Jerre Paxton, who became a leading figure in the state's horse-racing community.
