= Carl Julius Bergstrøm =

Norwegian architect

- Born: 05; Copenhagen, Denmark
- Died: 4 February 1898 (aged 69–70); Trondheim, Norway
- Occupation: Architect
- Spouse: Henriette Jacobsen
- Parent: J.W. Bergstrøm
- Buildings: Vågan Church

Carl Julius Bergstrøm (born April/May 1828 in Copenhagen, died 4 February 1898 in Trondheim) was a Norwegian architect who worked in the city of Trondheim from 1872 until his death in 1898.

== Biography ==
Bergstrøm probably came to Norway with his father J. W. Bergstrøm and his brother William in 1837 when he was only 9 years old. Shortly thereafter, the family settled in Horten, where the father worked as a builder at Karljohansvern. He married Henriette Jacobsen.

== Buildings ==
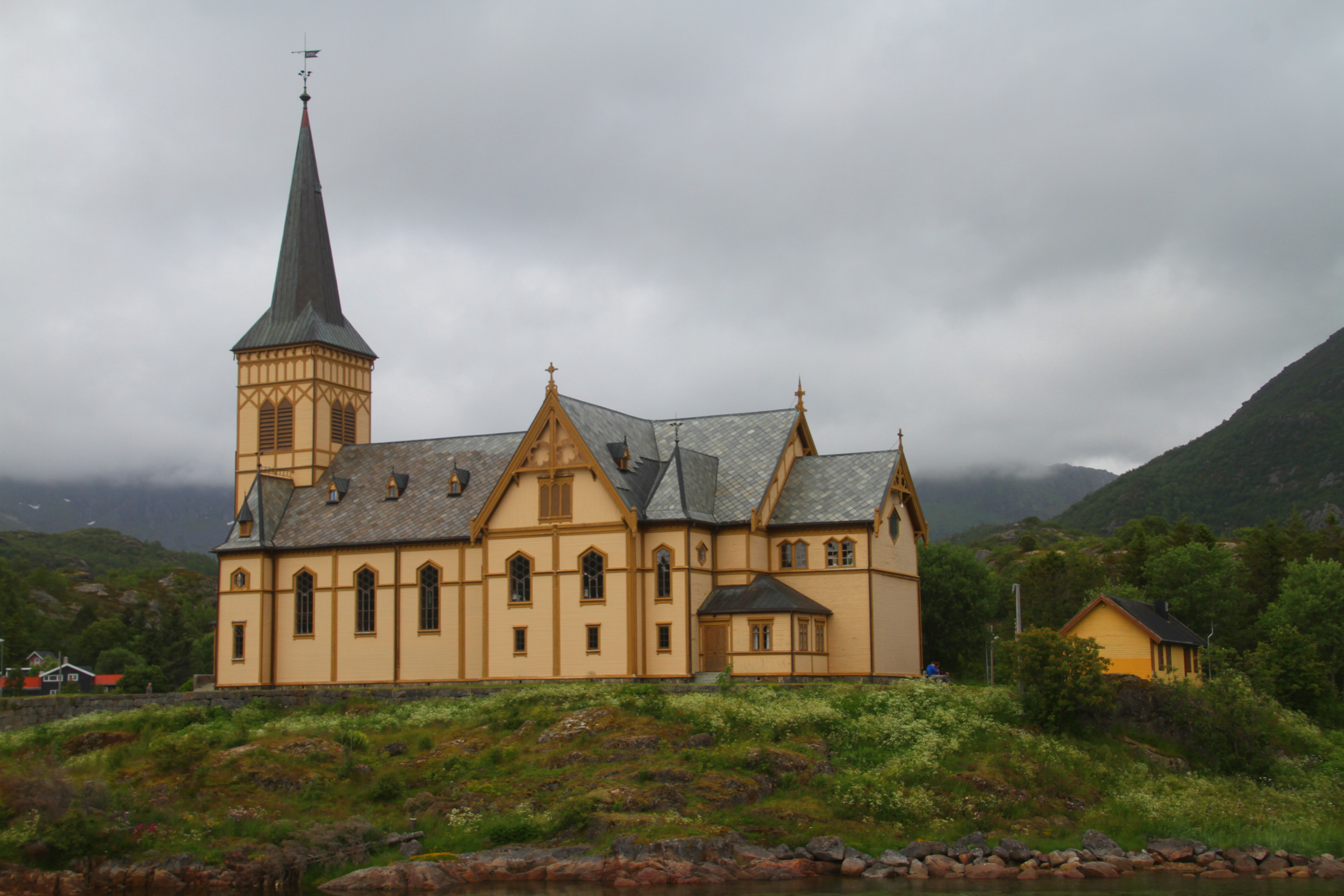
Vågan Church

Bergstrøm designed several church buildings made of wood or natural stone with a mixture of Swiss chalet style and Neo-gothic architecture. He also worked all over Northern Norway in what is now Trøndelag, Nordland, and Troms counties.

His most famous buildings are Vågan Church (1898), also known as the Lofoten Cathedral, as well as Melhus Church (1892), Orkdal Church (1892) and Sortland Church (1901). Other churches include: Gildeskål Church, Horg Church, Nordbotn Church, Nordli Church, Saura Church, and Sørli Church.
