= Horg Church =

Church in Trøndelag, Norway

- Horg kirke
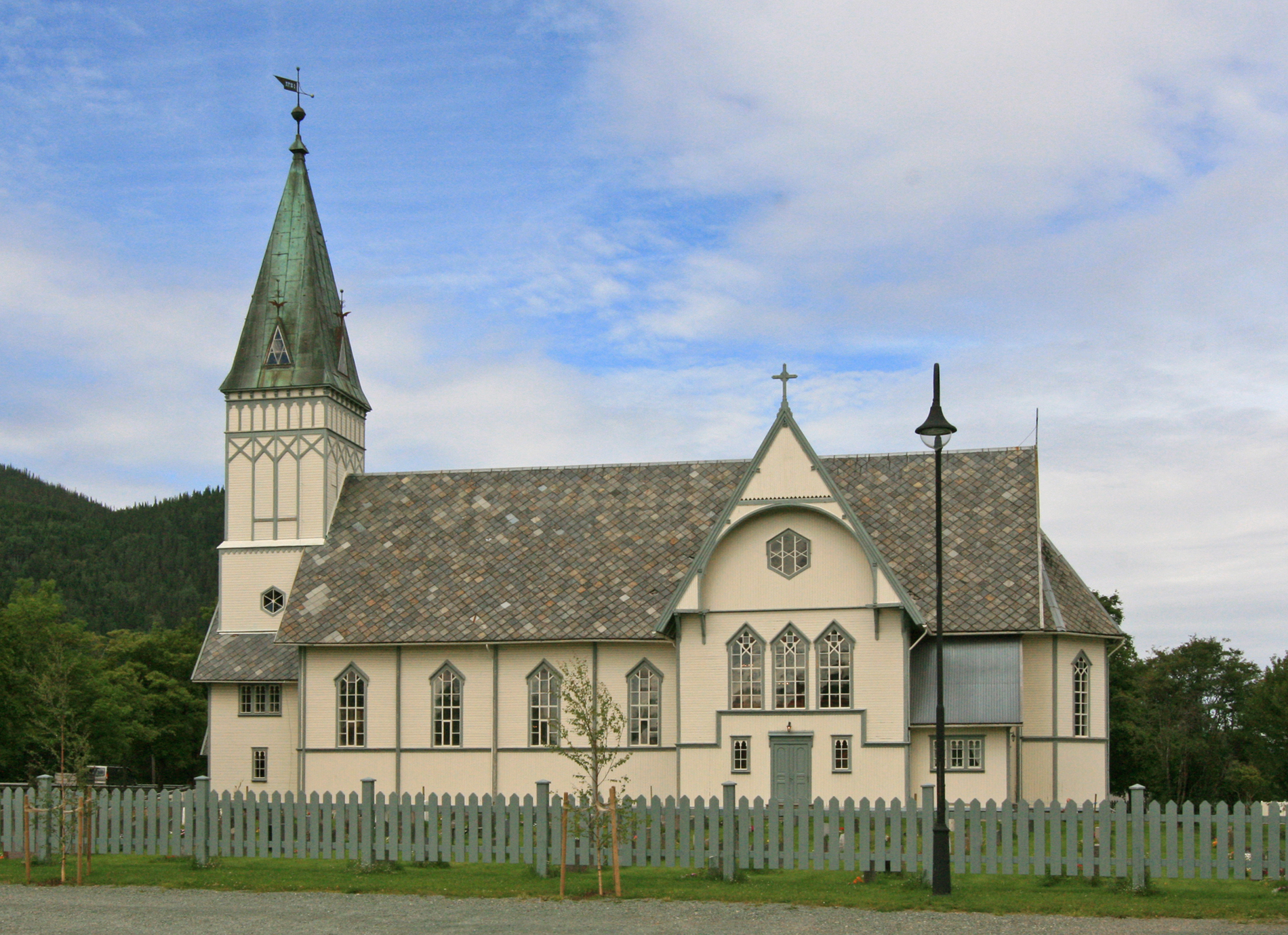
- View of the church
- Horg Church
- 63.1371001028°N 10.25459790224°E
- Location: Melhus Municipality, Trøndelag
- Country: Norway
- Denomination: Church of Norway
- Churchmanship: Evangelical Lutheran

History
- Status: Parish church
- Founded: 12th century
- Consecrated: 22 Nov 1893

Architecture
- Functional status: Active
- Architect: Carl J. Bergstrøm
- Architectural type: Cruciform
- Completed: 1893 (133 years ago)

Specifications
- Capacity: 700
- Materials: Wood

Administration
- Diocese: Nidaros bispedømme
- Deanery: Gauldal prosti
- Parish: Horg
- Norwegian Cultural Heritage Site
- Type: Church
- Status: Listed
- ID: 84631

Horg Church (Norwegian: Horg kirke) is a parish church of the Church of Norway in Melhus Municipality in Trøndelag county, Norway. It is located just south of the village of Lundamo, on the east side of the European route E06 highway and the river Gaula. It is the church for the Horg parish which is part of the Gauldal prosti (deanery) in the Diocese of Nidaros. The white, wooden church was built in a cruciform style in 1893 using plans drawn up by the architect Carl J. Bergstrøm. The church seats about 700 people.

== History ==
The earliest existing historical records of the church date back to the year 1533, but the church was not new that year. The first church in Horg was located at Grinni, about 1 kilometre (0.62 mi) to the southwest of the present church site. That church was a stave church that was likely built during the second half of the 12th century. A crucifix from the second half of the 12th century was in the church which leads historians to believe that this could be the time of the church's founding.

In the mid-1600s, it was decided to move the church site from Grinni to a new location on the opposite side of the nearby river and at the same time, close the nearby Foss Stave Church that was located about 2.5 kilometres (1.6 mi) to the south of the old church. In 1670, a new Y-shaped church was built at Horg, about 1 kilometre (0.62 mi) to the northeast of the old Grinni stave church. The new church was built by Ole Jonsen Hindrum and it was consecrate on 6 February 1670. This new church replaced the two old stave churches in Grinni and Foss (both of which were torn down). The new church had a rather unique Y-shaped design. The eastern arm housed the choir, the northern arm is where the women sat and the southern arm is where the men sat. The pulpit was located so it could be seen from all three wings of the church.

In 1726, the Y-shaped church was sold to the local parish priest at the great church auction. Many churches in Norway were sold to private owners so the King could raise money to help pay off war debts. It had many different owners over the years before it was finally bought by the people of the parish in 1797 for a very cheap price. The Y-shaped church gradually became too small for the parish (plus it was cold and drafty). In 1889, an initiative was taken to raise money to build a new church. Carl Julius Bergstrøm was hired to design the new church. The new church was built just south of the Y-shaped church from 1890–1893. The new building was consecrated on 22 November 1893 (the year 1892 is on the wind vane in the spire). The Y-shaped church was demolished during the spring of 1894 and the materials were sold at auction. Some of the furniture from the old church was transferred to the new church and other furniture was placed in the attic of the new church (such as the altarpiece and a number of epitaphs). There were also some items that were sent to a museum in Trondheim.

== Media gallery ==
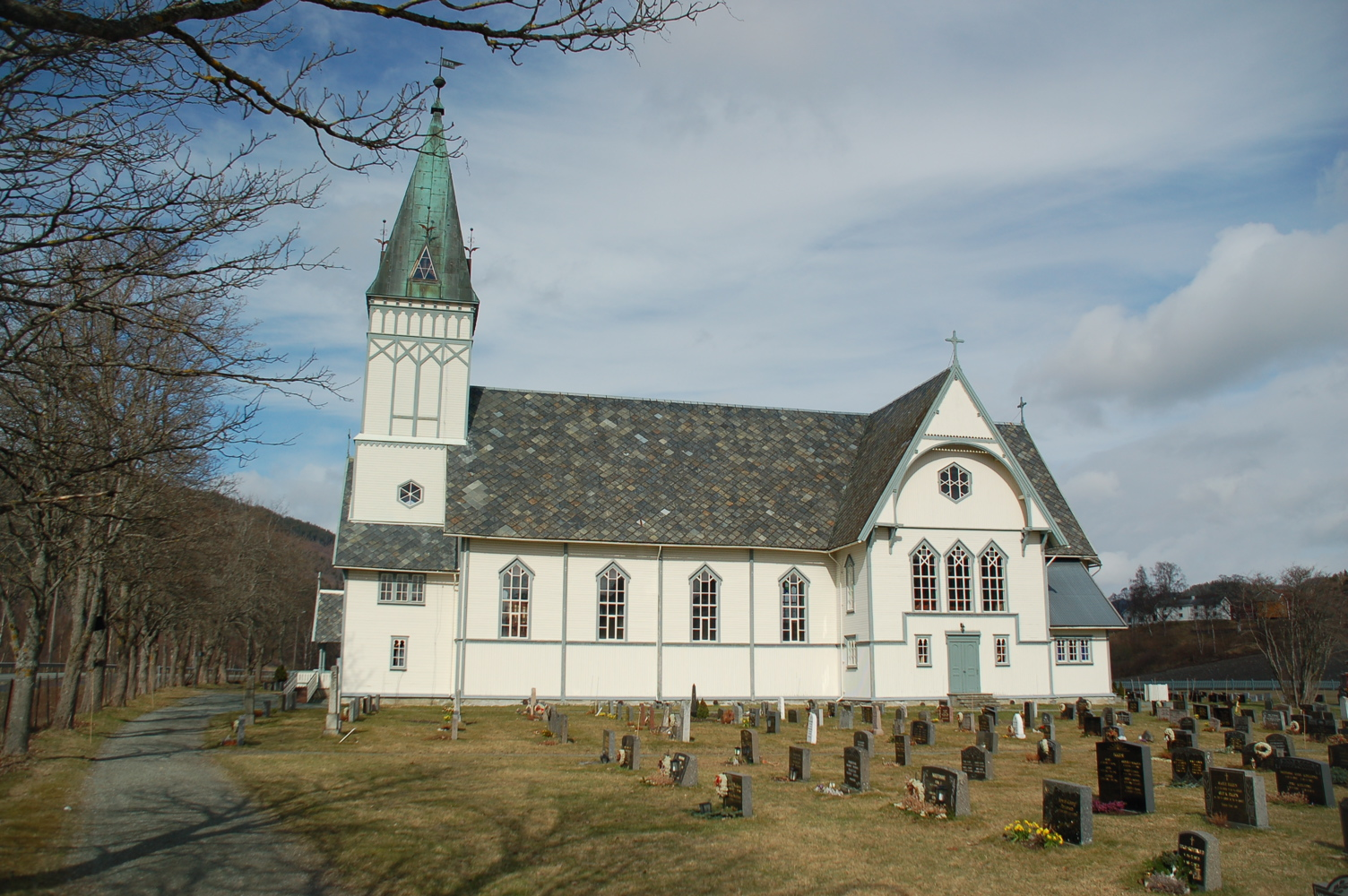

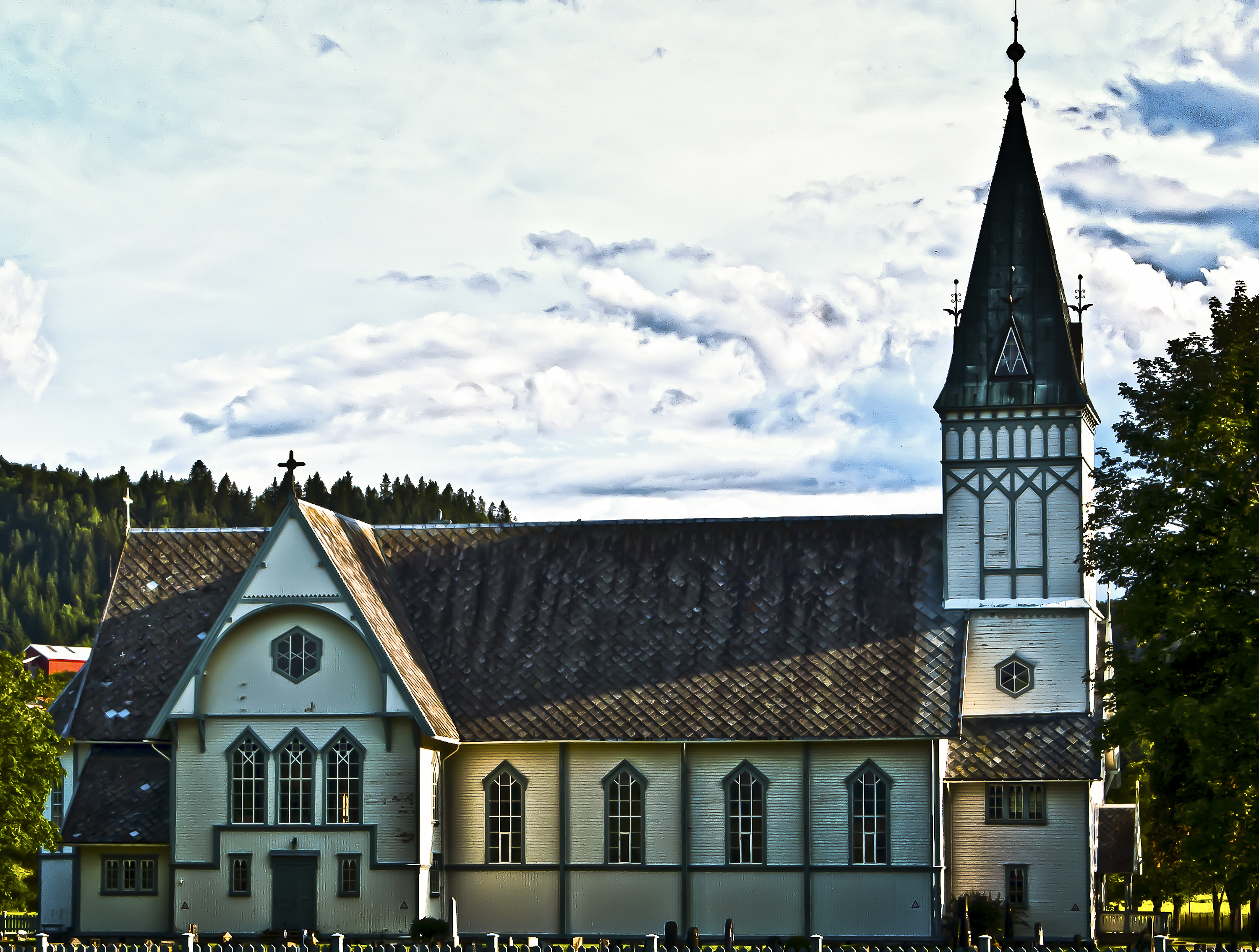

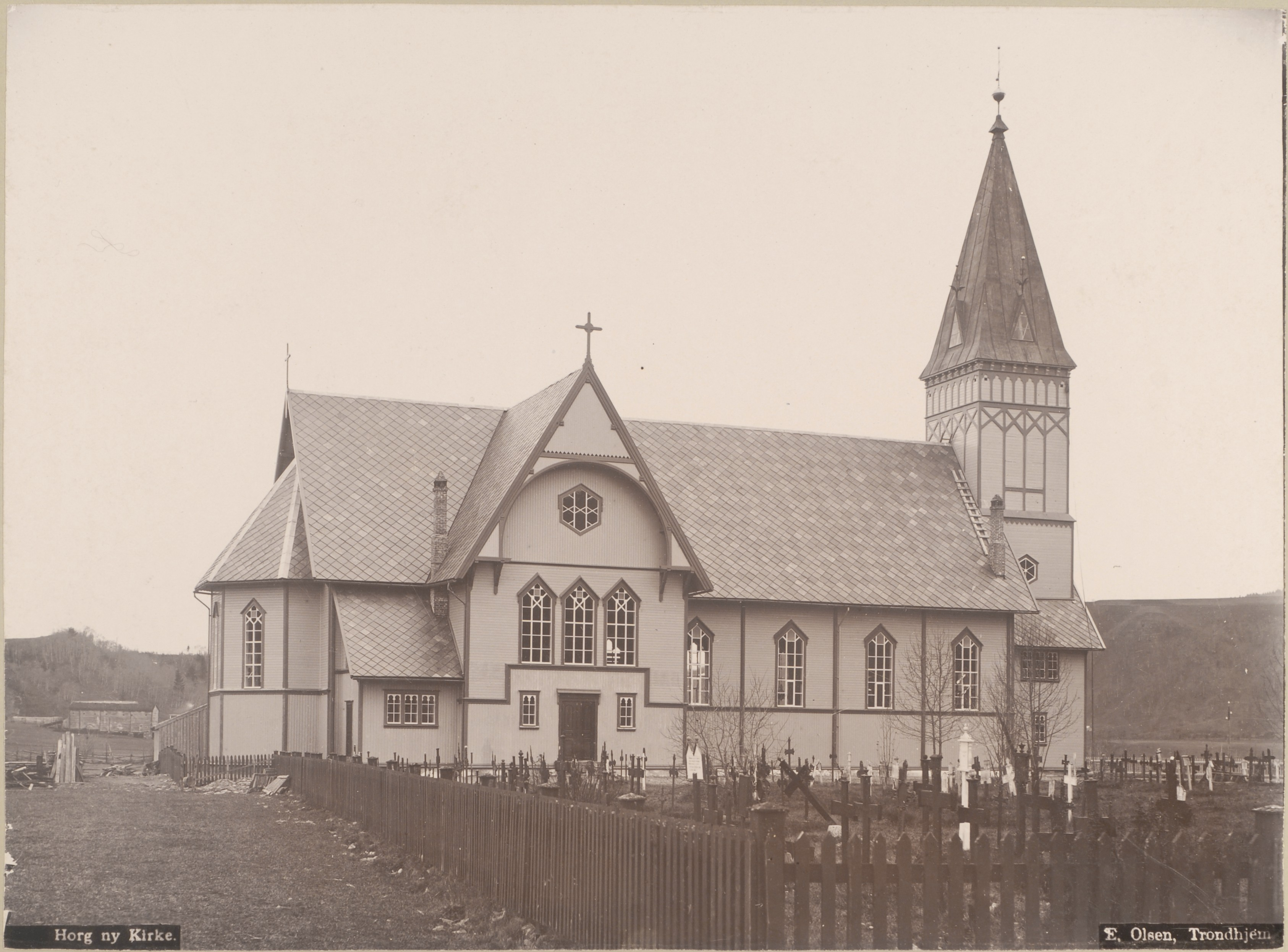

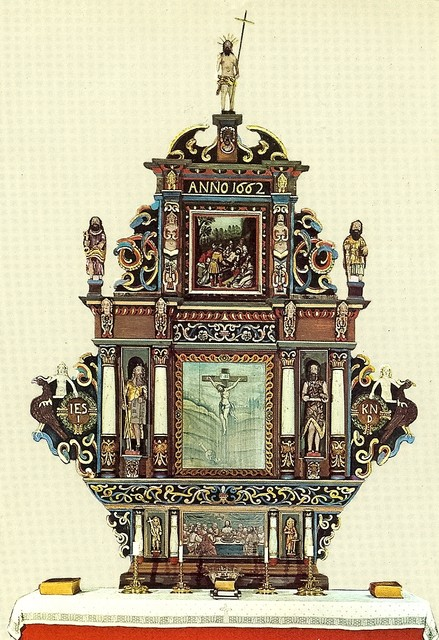
Altar table

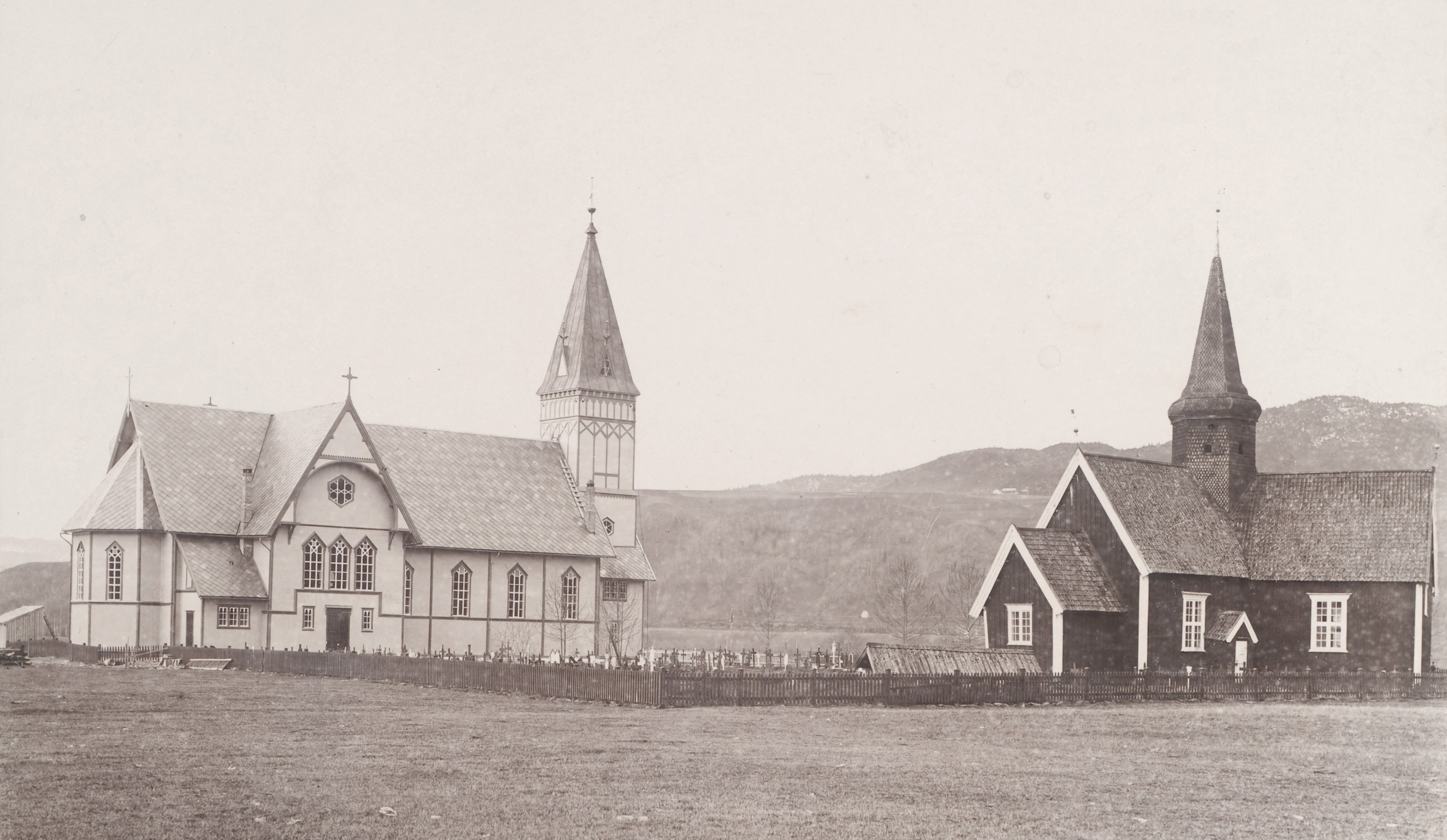
Old and new Horg churches side by side

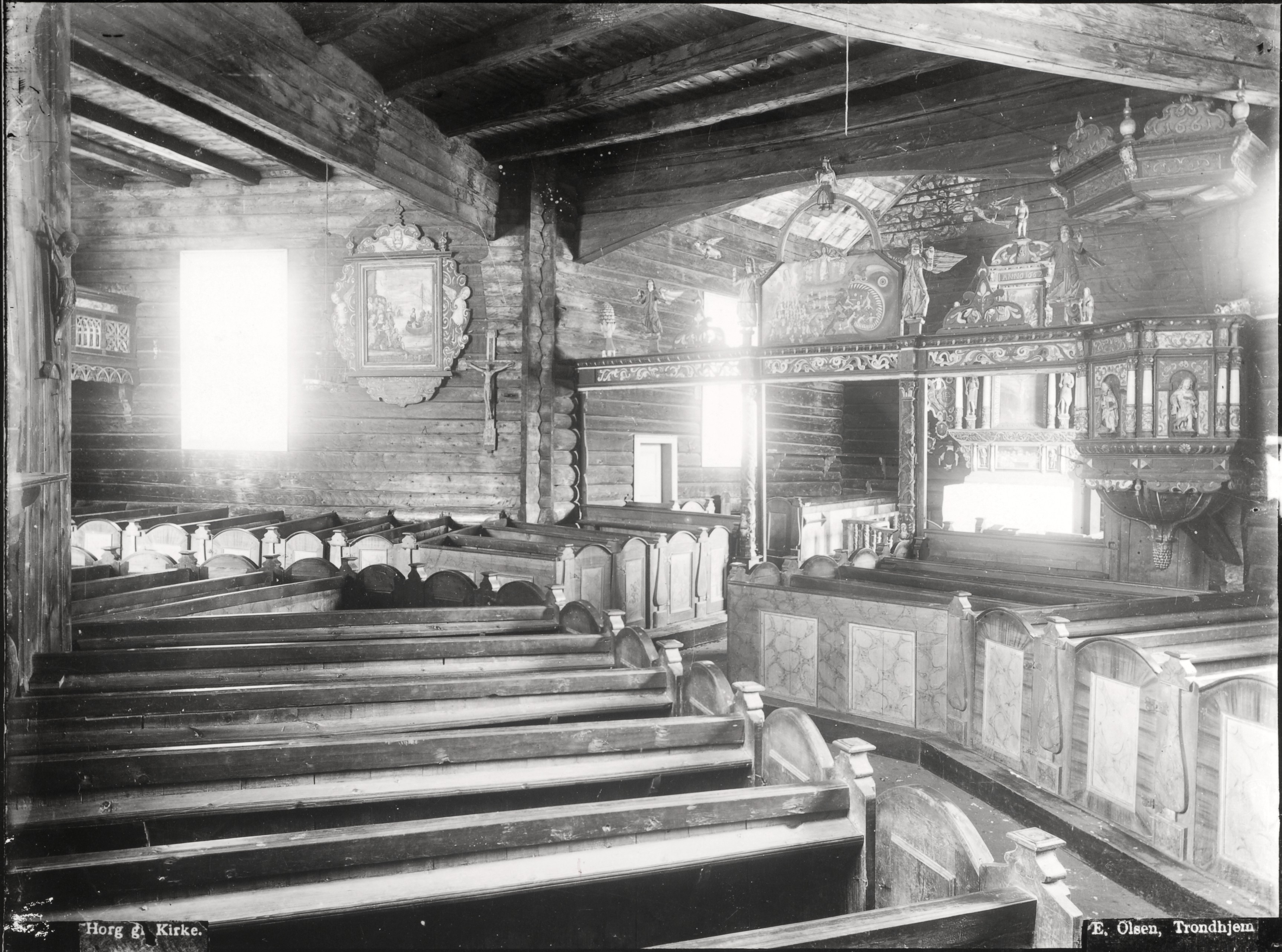
Interior of the old Horg church

== See also ==
- List of churches in Nidaros
