= Orkdal Church =

Church in Trøndelag, Norway

- Orkdal kirke
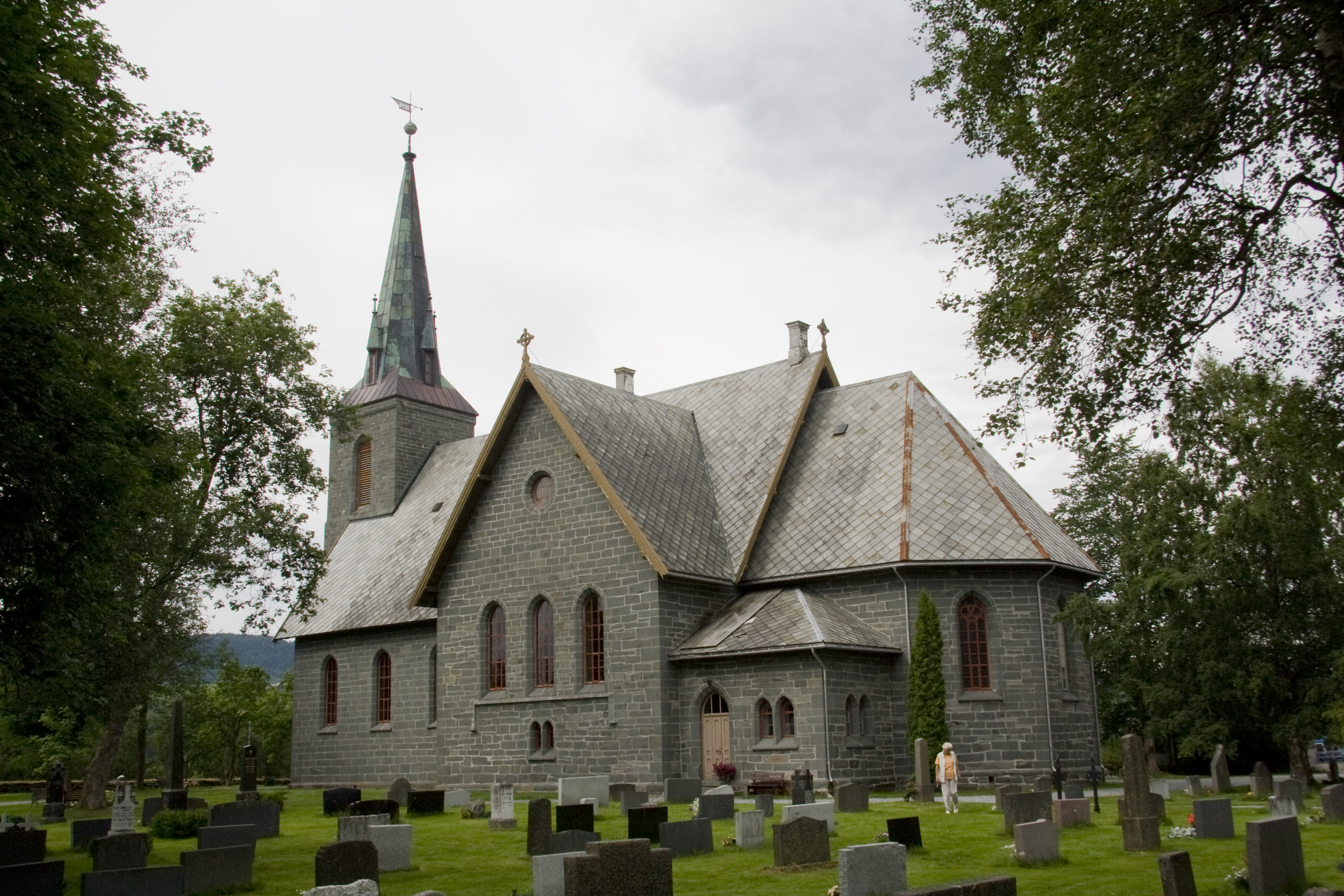
- View of the church
- Orkdal Church
- 63°15′52″N 9°48′51″E
- Location: Orkland Municipality, Trøndelag
- Country: Norway
- Denomination: Church of Norway
- Churchmanship: Evangelical Lutheran

History
- Status: Parish church
- Founded: c. 1100
- Consecrated: 13 Dec 1893

Architecture
- Functional status: Active
- Architect: Carl Julius Bergstrøm
- Architectural type: Long church
- Style: Neo-Gothic
- Completed: 1893 (133 years ago)

Specifications
- Capacity: 450
- Materials: Stone

Administration
- Diocese: Nidaros bispedømme
- Deanery: Orkdal prosti
- Parish: Orkdal
- Norwegian Cultural Heritage Site
- Type: Church
- Status: Listed
- ID: 85235

Orkdal Church (Norwegian: Orkdal kirke) is a parish church of the Church of Norway in Orkland Municipality in Trøndelag county, Norway. It is located in the village of Fannrem, about 6 kilometres (3.7 mi) south of the town of Orkanger. It is the main church for the Orkdal parish as well as the seat of the Orkdal prosti (deanery) within the Diocese of Nidaros. The gray, stone, neo-Gothic church was built in a long church design in 1893 using plans drawn up by the architect Carl Julius Bergstrøm (1828–1898). The church seats about 450 people.

== History ==
The earliest existing historical records of the church date back to the year 1533, but the church was built long before that time. The church site has been occupied for many centuries. The church was built on the old medieval Gryting farm, so historically, the church was known as Gryting Church. The first church here was likely built around the year 1100 and it was a small wooden church. Not much is known about that building. During the mid-1100s, the church was no longer large enough for the congregation, so the old wood church was torn down and a new stone church was built. The new stone church was likely constructed sometime between the years 1145–1165. The Romanesque building was constructed out of soapstone. It was modified a little around the end of the 12th century (around 1180) with modifications to some of the arched openings in the building. The church had a rectangular nave and a smaller, rectangular choir. In 1650, there was an addition built on the north side of the nave to make more room for the people from Orkanger to fit in the church.

In 1814, this church served as an election church (Norwegian: valgkirke). Together with more than 300 other parish churches across Norway, it was a polling station for elections to the 1814 Norwegian Constituent Assembly which wrote the Constitution of Norway. This was Norway's first national elections. Each church parish was a constituency that elected people called "electors" who later met together in each county to elect the representatives for the assembly that was to meet at Eidsvoll Manor later that year.

In 1890, the old church was torn down in order to make room for a new, larger church building. The new church was designed by the architect Carl Julius Bergstrøm (1828-1898). It was also a stone building, constructed out of soapstone from Munklia in Orkdal and it had a neo-Gothic long church design. The new, larger church was completed in 1893. It has a large nave with a tower on the west end and a choir on the east end with a sacristy to the north and south of the choir. The new church was consecrated on 13 December 1893.

== Media gallery ==
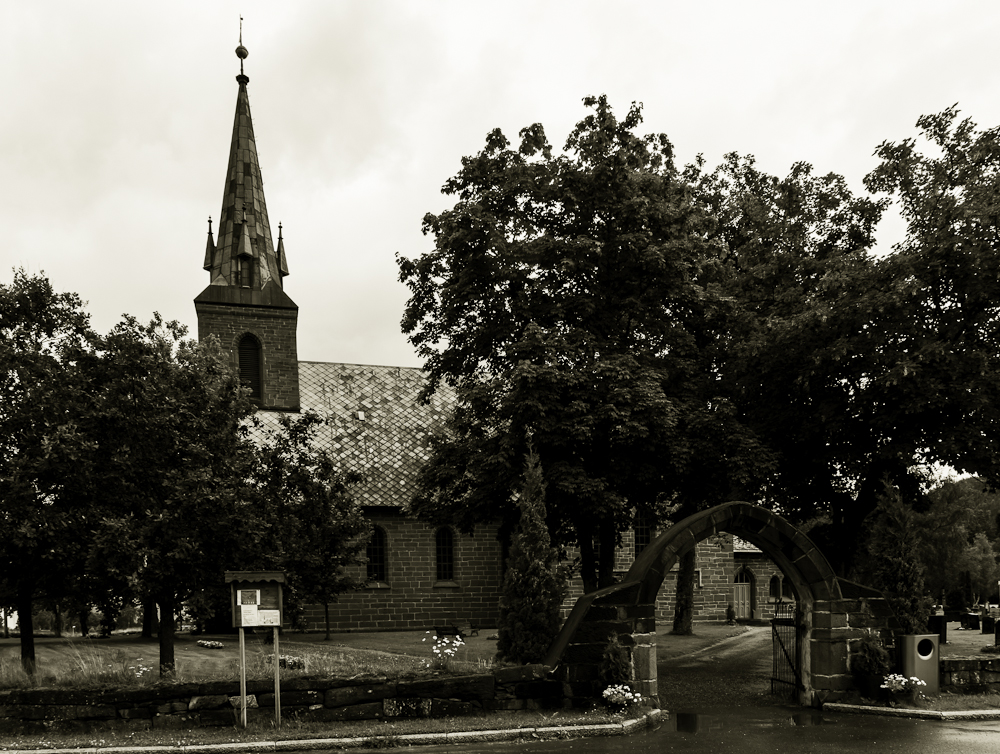

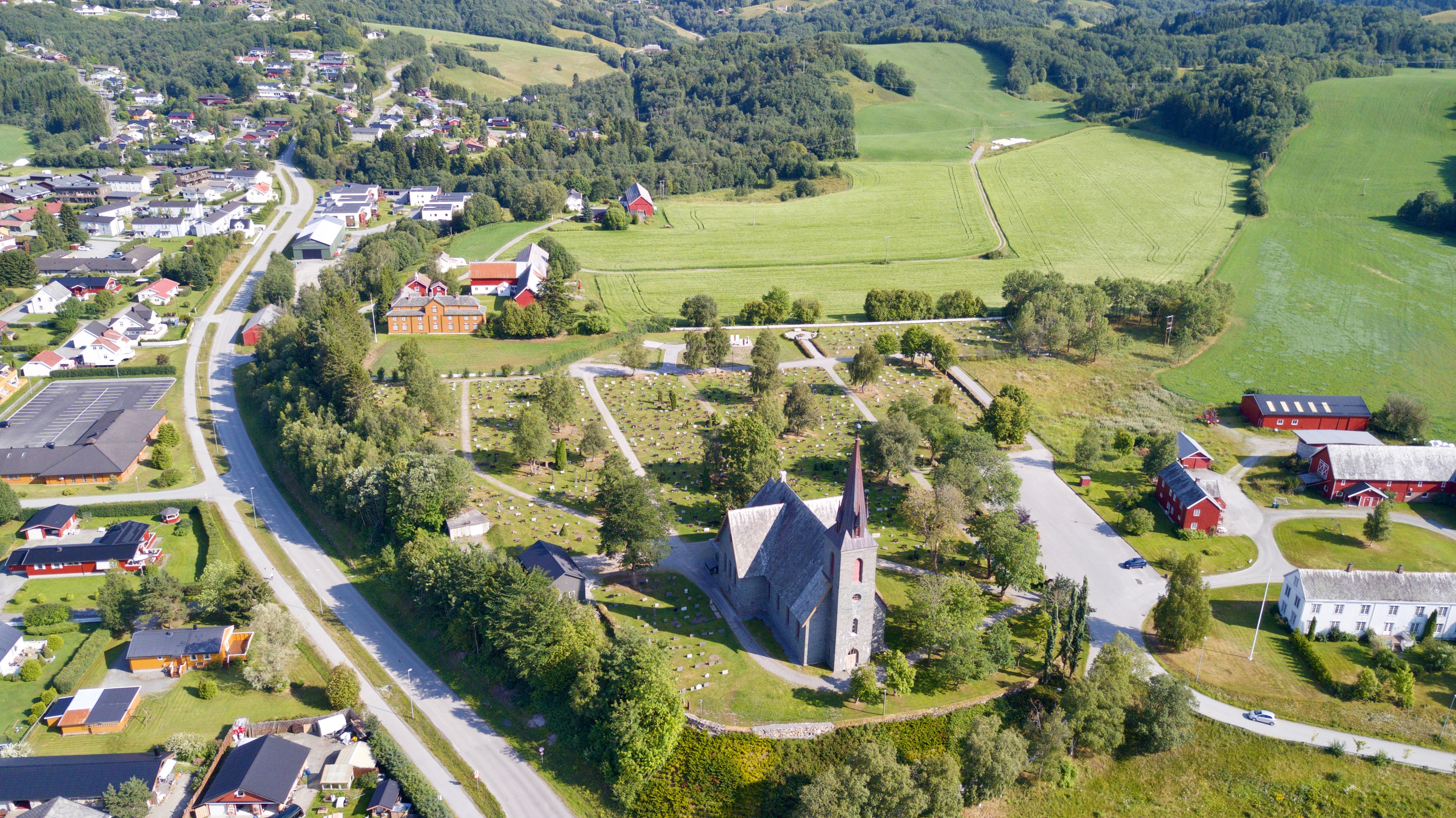

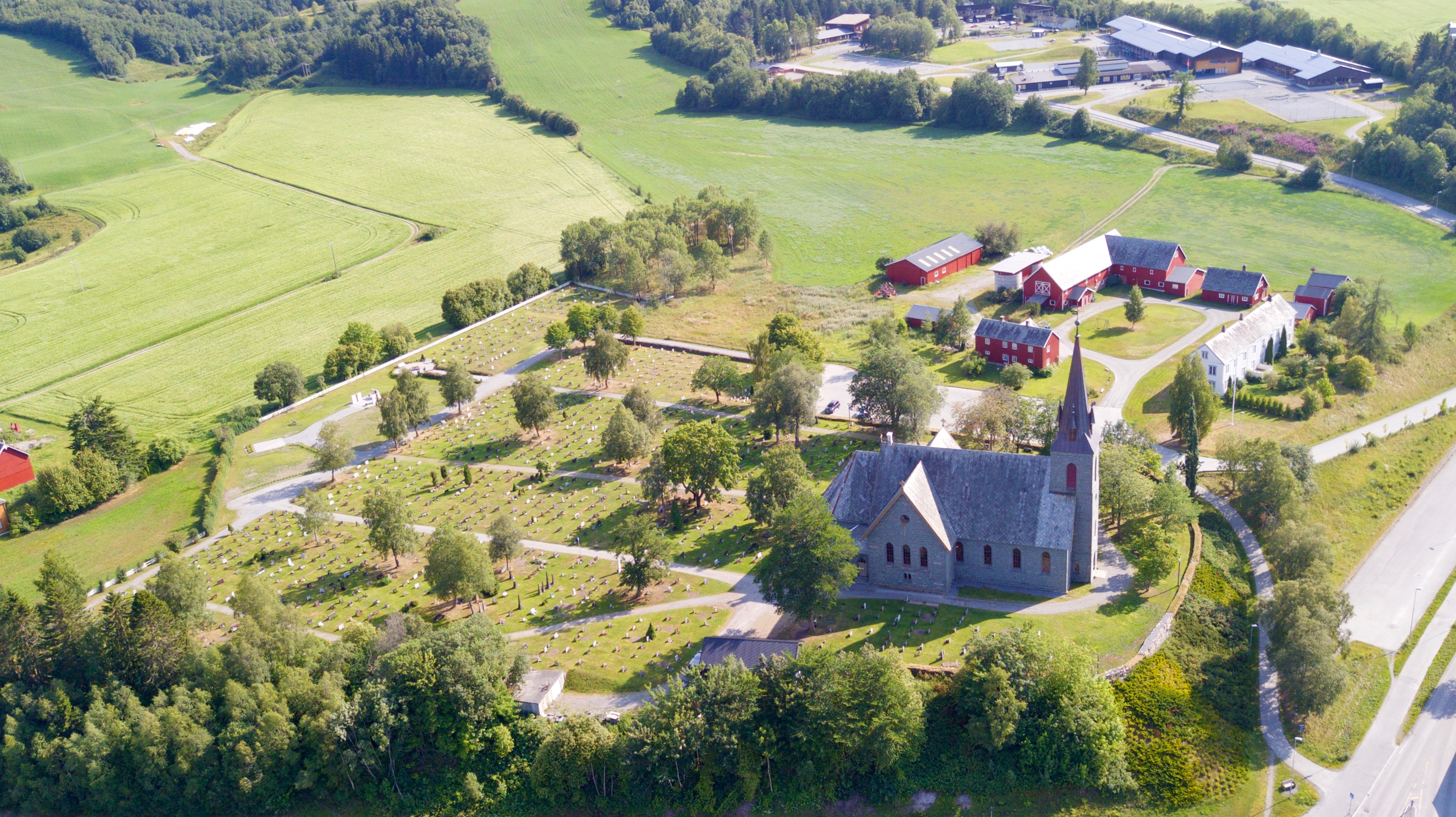

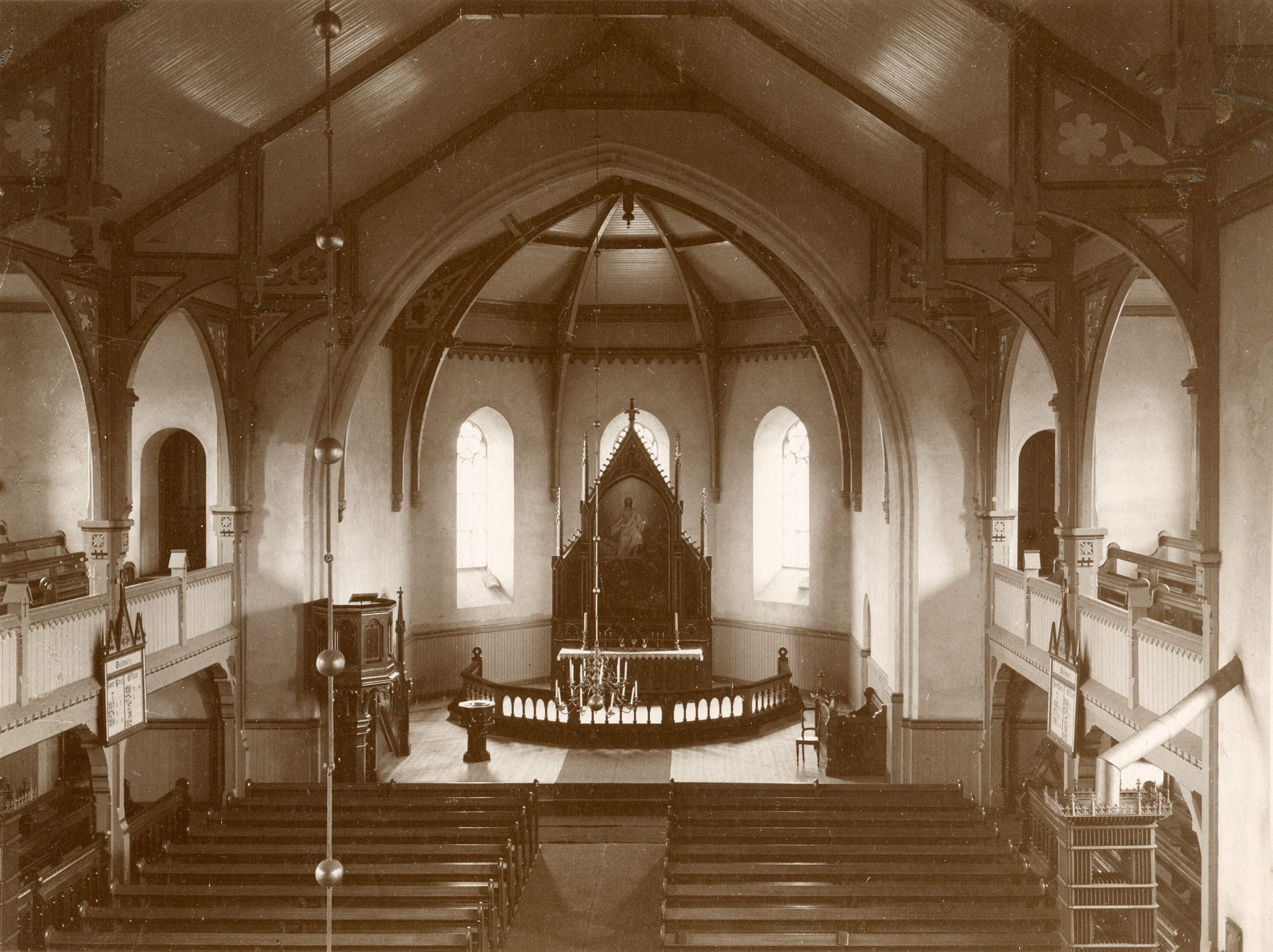

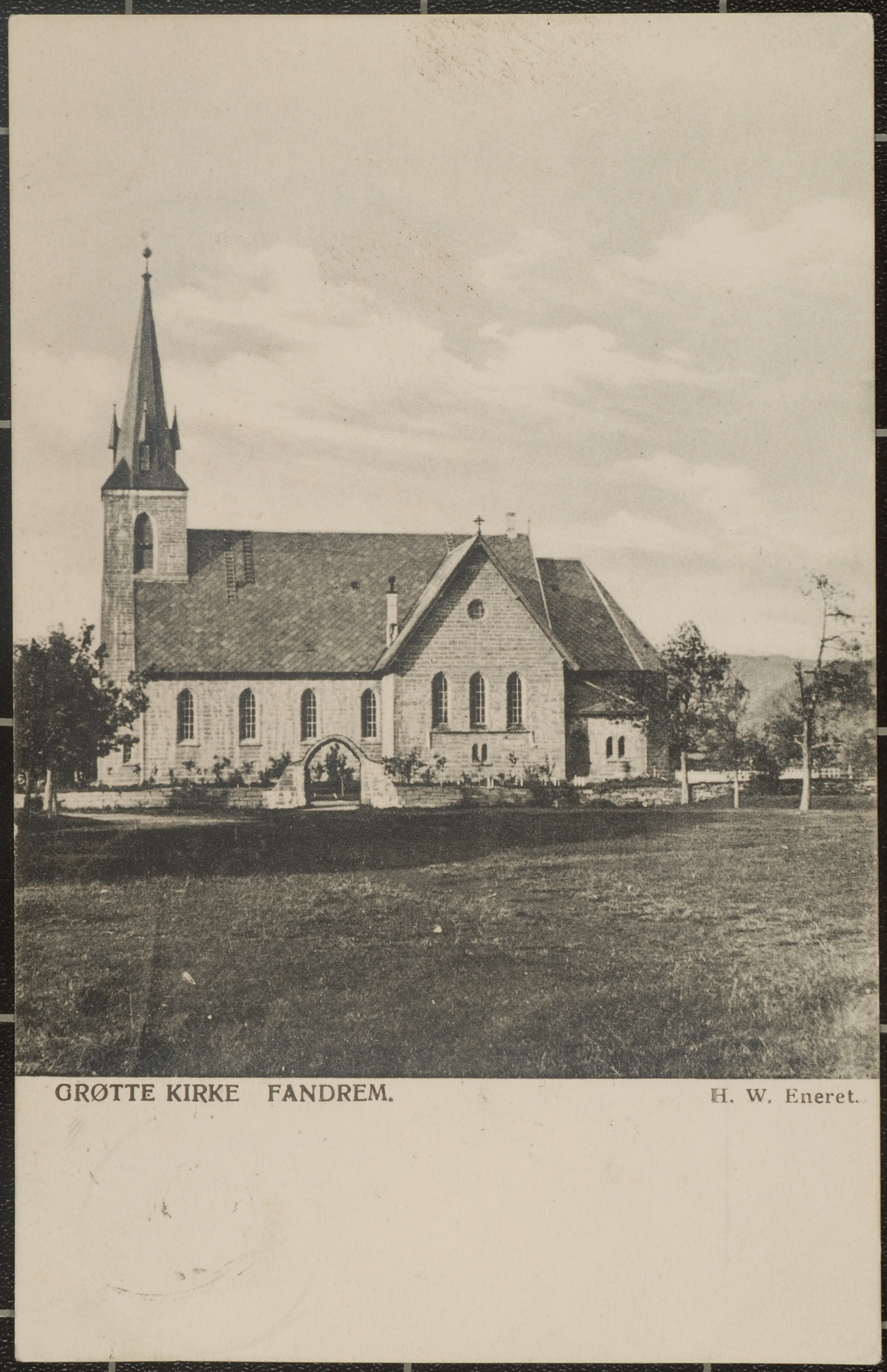

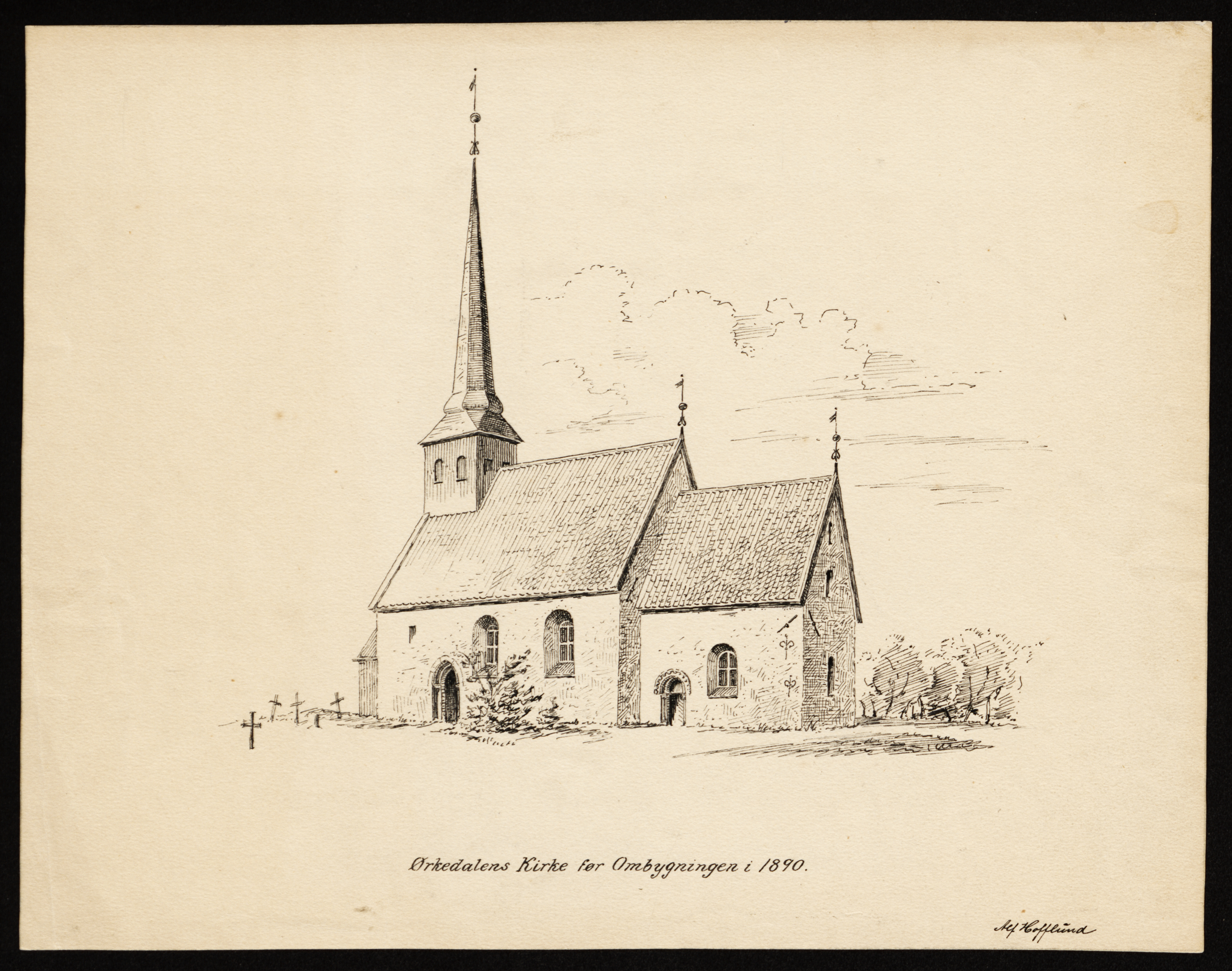
Drawing of the old church

== See also ==
- List of churches in Nidaros
