= Nordbotn, Trøndelag =

Village in Hitra Municipality, Norway

Nordbotn
- Village
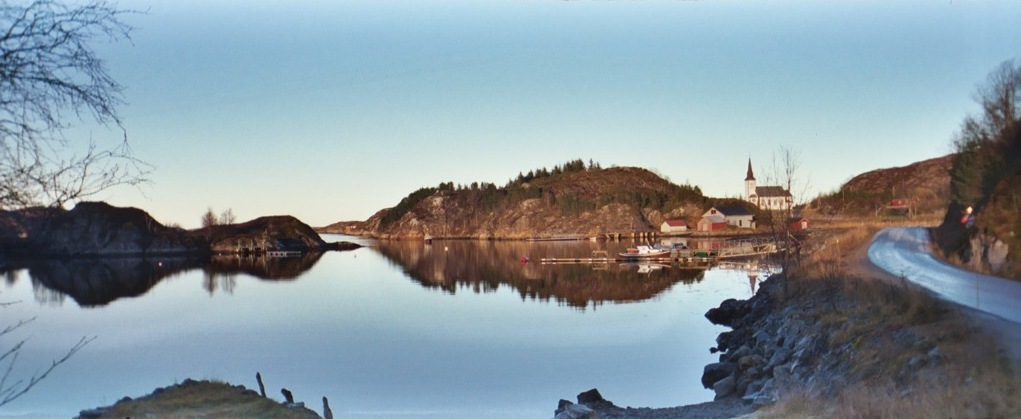
- View of the Nordbotn Church
- Interactive map of Nordbotn
- Location within Trøndelag Location within Norway
- Coordinates: 63.6468°N 09.1376°E
- Country: Norway
- Region: Central Norway
- County: Trøndelag
- District: Fosen
- Municipality: Hitra Municipality
- Elevation: 8 m (26 ft)
- Time zone: UTC+01:00 (CET)
  - Summer (DST): UTC+02:00 (CEST)
- Post Code: 7242 Knarrlagsund

Nordbotn is a village in Hitra Municipality in Trøndelag county, Norway. It is located on the east side of the island of Fjellværsøya. Nordbotn Church is located in this village which was once a trading post with a post office, bakery, and store.
