= Holotypic Occlupanid Research Group =

Parody research organisation

- Abbreviation: HORG
- Formation: 1994; 32 years ago Website: December 1, 2011; 14 years ago
- Founder: John Daniel
- Type: Nonprofit
- Location: Berkeley, California, United States
- Website: horg.com

The Holotypic Occlupanid Research Group (or HORG, IPA: [hɔːrɡ]) is a parody research organisation which studies bread clips (called "occlupanids" by HORG) as if they were living organisms with a focus on synthetic taxonomy. HORG's motto is Fiat Divisa Panem, which roughly translates from Latin as "Let it be sliced bread".

== Reception ==
The parody site has been noted by independent media, drawing similarities to real taxonomies, and noting how the synthetic taxonomy can assist in learning the design history of the object itself (bread clips).

HORG's efforts were included in a 2018 exhibition comprising Mmuseumm's sixth season. "Milk & Bread", a 2025 art and design work by Susan Goldberg, mentions HORG. It was inspired by her experience collecting and displaying bread clips before and during the COVID-19 pandemic and how their display can reflect the increased workload and repetitive domesticity put on women and especially mothers during lockdown.

Plastic bread clips may perforate or obstruct the gastrointestinal tract, and are potentially fatal. Terminology coined by HORG has been used by researchers in the hope that a taxonomy of bread clips "will help determine if certain orders present a higher health risk than others...."
