= Nordbotn Church =

Church in Trøndelag, Norway

- Nordbotn kirke
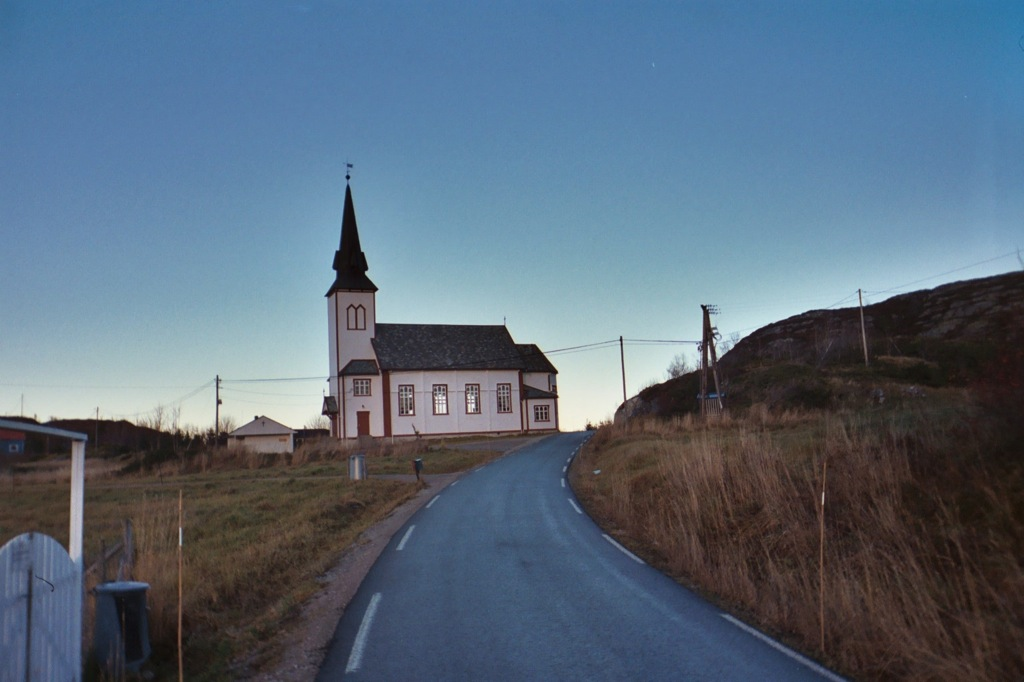
- View of the church
- Nordbotn Church
- 63.648952945°N 09.1369999945°E
- Location: Hitra Municipality, Trøndelag
- Country: Norway
- Denomination: Church of Norway
- Churchmanship: Evangelical Lutheran

History
- Status: Parish church
- Founded: 1900
- Consecrated: 4 Dec 1900

Architecture
- Functional status: Active
- Architect: Carl J. Bergstrøm
- Architectural type: Long church
- Completed: 1900 (126 years ago)

Specifications
- Capacity: 280
- Materials: Wood

Administration
- Diocese: Nidaros bispedømme
- Deanery: Orkdal prosti
- Parish: Hitra og Fillan
- Norwegian Cultural Heritage Site
- Type: Church
- Status: Not protected
- ID: 85146

Nordbotn Church (Norwegian: Nordbotn kirke) is a parish church of the Church of Norway in Hitra Municipality in Trøndelag county, Norway. It is located in the village of Nordbotn on the island of Fjellværsøya. It is one of the churches for the Hitra og Fillan parish which is part of the Orkdal prosti (deanery) in the Diocese of Nidaros. The white, wooden church was built in a long church design in 1900 using plans drawn up by the architect Carl Julius Bergstrøm. The church seats about 280 people.

== History ==
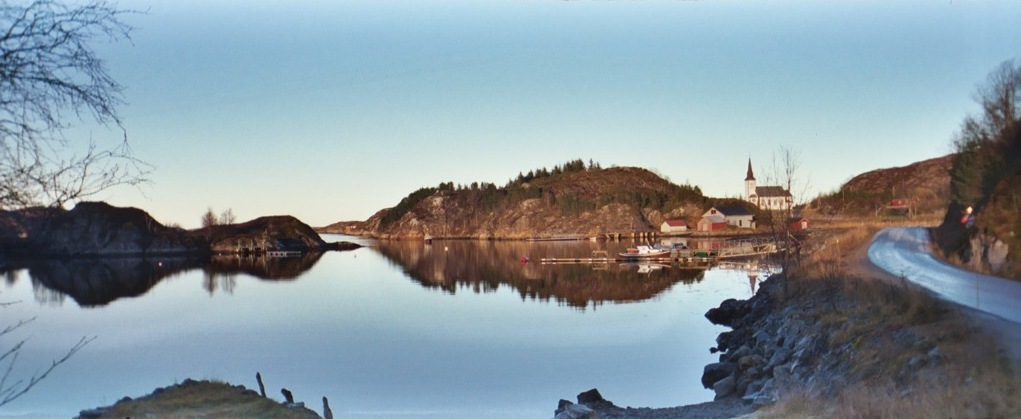
View of the church on the island.

In the late 1890s, approval to build a chapel at Nordbotn was given and Carl Julius Bergstrøm was hired to design the new chapel. The new church was built in 1900 and consecrated on 4 December 1900. The new building was a long church with a sacristy on both sides of the chancel.

== See also ==
- List of churches in Nidaros
