= Malvik =

Malvik may refer to:

== Places ==
- Malvik Municipality, a municipality in Trøndelag county, Norway
- Malvik, an urban area also known as Vikhammer in Malvik Municipality in Trøndelag county, Norway
- Malvik Church, a church in Malvik Municipality in Trøndelag county, Norway

== People ==
- Ingvild Vaggen Malvik, a Norwegian politician for the Socialist Left Party.

== Other ==
- Malvik IL, a sports club based in Malvik Municipality in Trøndelag county, Norway
