= Forsnes Chapel =

Church in Trøndelag, Norway

- Forsnes kapell
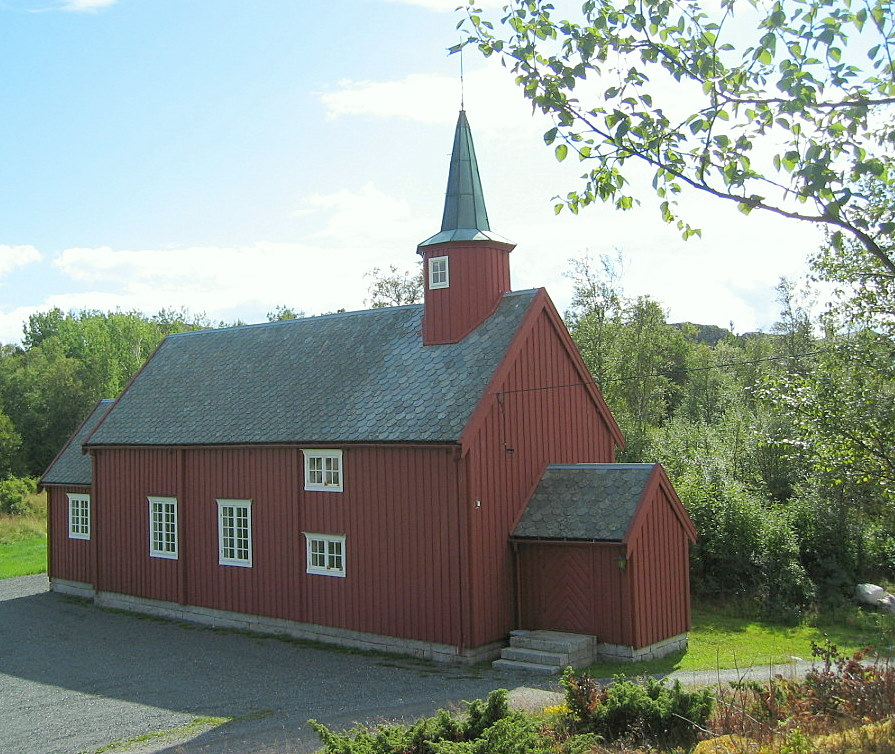
- View of the chapel
- Forsnes Chapel
- 63.4303019312°N 08.4275976699°E
- Location: Hitra Municipality, Trøndelag
- Country: Norway
- Denomination: Church of Norway
- Churchmanship: Evangelical Lutheran

History
- Status: Chapel
- Founded: 1935
- Consecrated: 17 Oct 1935
- Events: Moved to Forsnes (1935)

Architecture
- Functional status: Active
- Architect: M.O. Gunther
- Architectural type: Long church
- Completed: 1763 (263 years ago)

Specifications
- Capacity: 164
- Materials: Wood

Administration
- Diocese: Nidaros bispedømme
- Deanery: Orkdal prosti
- Parish: Kvenvær og Sandstad
- Norwegian Cultural Heritage Site
- Type: Church
- Status: Automatically protected
- ID: 84183

Forsnes Chapel (Norwegian: Forsnes kapell) is a parish church of the Church of Norway in Hitra Municipality in Trøndelag county, Norway. It is located in the village of Forsnes on the southwestern coast of the island of Hitra. It is one of the churches for the Kvenvær og Sandstad parish which is part of the Orkdal prosti (deanery) in the Diocese of Nidaros. The red, wooden church was built in a long church design in 1935 using materials from the Old Kvenvær Church which had been moved here and rebuilt by the builder M.O. Gunther. The church seats about 164 people.

== History ==
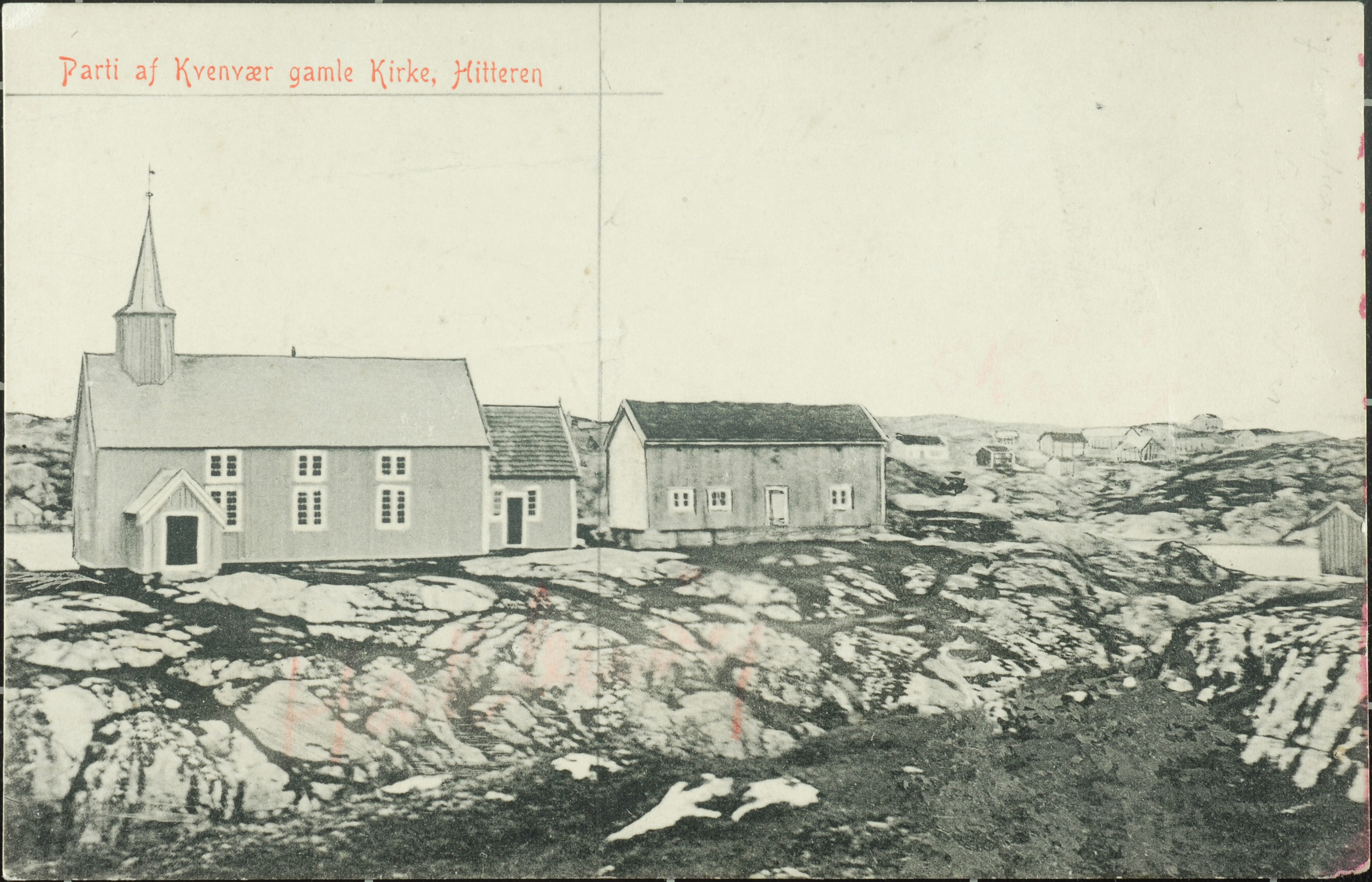
Drawing of the old Kvenvær Church

=== Old Kvenvær Church ===
Kvenvær Church was historically located on the small island of Hakkebuøya off the western shores of the village of Kvenvær on the main island of Hitra where it was established in the mid-15th century. A new church was built there in 1763 which was in use there until 1909 when the new Kvenvær Church was built in the village of Kvenvær on the main island of Hitra in a more easily accessible location.

The old Kvenvær Church stood unused from 1909 until 1934 when the 171-year-old building was deconstructed and moved to the village of Forsnes where it was rebuilt and renamed as the Forsnes Chapel. The builder M.O. Gunther from Hommelvik led the reconstruction. The newly rebuilt chapel was consecrated on 17 October 1935.

== See also ==
- List of churches in Nidaros
