= Johan Nygaardsvold =

Norwegian politician (1879–1952)

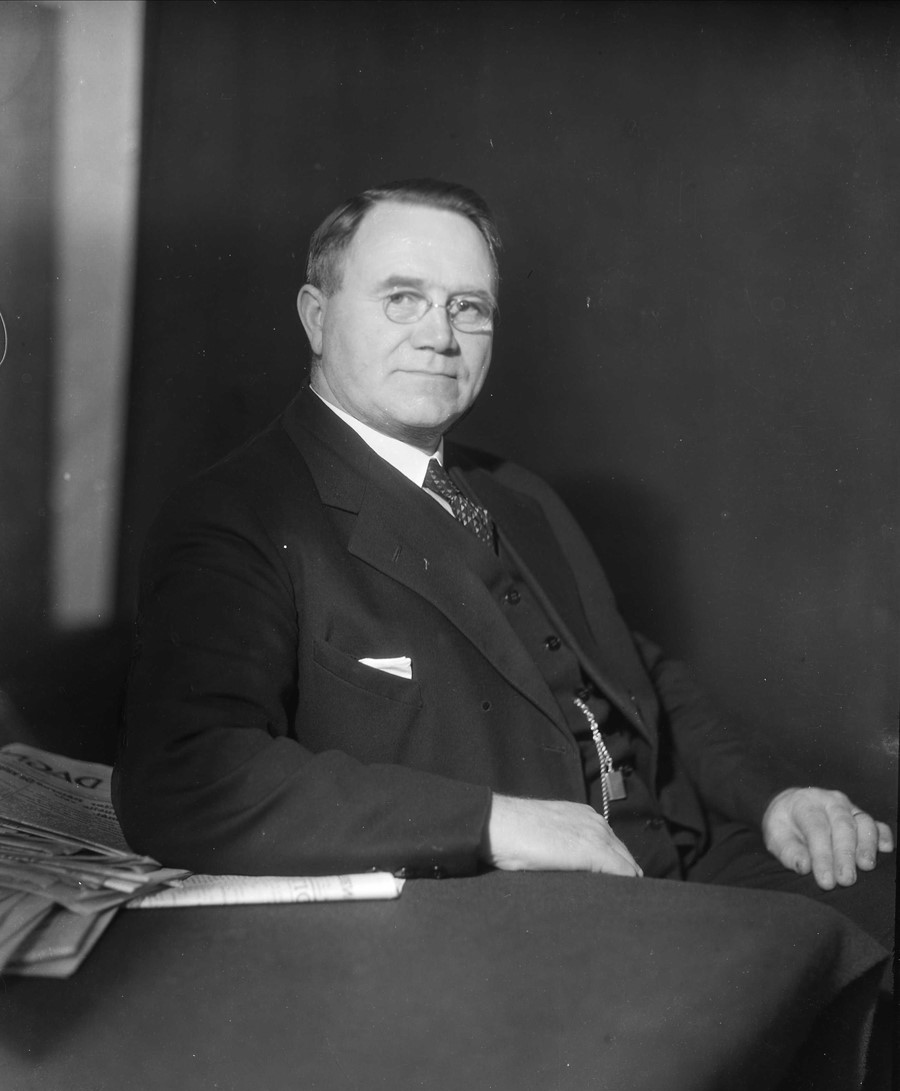
- Nygaardsvold in 1934

Prime Minister of Norway
- In office 20 March 1935 – 25 June 1945
- Monarch: Haakon VII
- Preceded by: Johan Ludwig Mowinckel
- Succeeded by: Einar Gerhardsen

President of the Storting
- In office 11 January 1934 – 20 March 1935
- Prime Minister: Johan Ludwig Mowinckel
- Vice President: C. J. Hambro
- Preceded by: C.J. Hambro
- Succeeded by: C. J. Hambro

Parliamentary Leader of the Labour Party
- In office 5 March 1932 – 20 March 1935
- Leader: Oscar Torp
- Preceded by: Alfred Madsen
- Succeeded by: Sverre Støstad

Minister of Labour
- In office 20 March 1935 – 2 October 1939
- Prime Minister: Himself
- Preceded by: Ole Monsen Mjelde
- Succeeded by: Olav Hindahl

Minister of Agriculture
- In office 28 January 1928 – 15 February 1928
- Prime Minister: Christopher Hornsrud
- Preceded by: Ole Bærøe
- Succeeded by: Hans Jørgensen Aarstad

Member of the Norwegian Parliament
- In office 1 January 1916 – 31 December 1949
- Constituency: Sør-Trøndelag

Personal details
- Born: 6 September 1879 Hommelvik, Sør-Trøndelag, United Kingdoms of Sweden and Norway
- Died: 13 March 1952 (aged 72) Trondheim, Sør-Trøndelag, Norway
- Party: Labour
- Spouse: Albine Regine Brandslet (1878–1961)

Johan Nygaardsvold (Norwegian pronunciation: [ˈnỳːɡoːʂvɔɫ]; 6 September 1879 – 13 March 1952) was a Norwegian politician from the Labour Party who served as the prime minister of Norway from 1935 to 1945. From June 1940 until May 1945, he oversaw the Norwegian Government-in-exile from London as head of the Nygaardsvold cabinet during the occupation of Norway by Nazi Germany.

== Background ==
Nygaardsvold was born in Hommelvik, in Trondhjems Amt, Norway. His parents were Anders Nygaardsvold (1839–1897) and Andrea Ratvold (1845–1929). His father was a tenant farmer and a founding member of the first labour union in the area. Johan took his first job as a lumber mill worker when he was 12 years old. On 6 June 1901, he married Albine Regine Brandslet (1878–1961).

Nygaardsvold and his wife emigrated to Canada in 1902 where he took jobs in British Columbia, and in the US in Kalispell, Montana, and Spokane, Washington. He and his wife returned to Norway in 1907 after he had followed a career including as an Industrial Workers of the World agitator. In 1909 he found a job at Hommelvik Sawmill.

== Political career ==
Nygaardsvold campaign poster

In 1910, Nygaardsvold was elected to the board of education for the Labour Party, and rose quickly through the ranks in local politics. In 1916, he was elected to the Norwegian parliament for the first time, serving continuously until 1949. He worked as a labourer in the Swedish lumber industry during the summers in the first few years. From 1920 to 1922 he served as the mayor for his home town of Malvik.

In 1928, Nygaardsvold was appointed minister of agriculture in the short-lived Christopher Hornsrud cabinet. From 11 January 1934 to 20 March 1935 he served as President of the Storting. In 1935, Nygaardsvold was asked to form a government as Prime Minister of Norway. He was serving as Prime Minister when Nazi Germany attacked on Norway 9 April 1940. Following the German occupation of Norway, German officials demanded that the Government headed by Nygaardsvold capitulate and that the King appoint a government headed by Nazi sympathiser Vidkun Quisling. King Haakon VII stated that he could not comply with the German ultimatum and would rather abdicate than appoint Quisling prime minister. On 7 June 1940, the Norwegian Government-in-exile relocated to London. Nygaardsvold continued as prime minister in exile until the government returned to Norway on 31 May 1945. He resigned on 25 June 1945 when King Haakon appointed Einar Gerhardsen to head an interim government composed of all political parties.

A number of progressive reforms were instituted during Nygaardsvold's time as prime minister. Following its entry into office, the new Labour government put through a budget that made appropriations for various social purposes such as housing, relief, and reduced interest on loans. Large sums for developing new farms were provided, together with a minimum price for butter. A bank was also organized to provide farmers with cheap credit, while other measures aimed at helping agriculture and fisherman were carried out. In addition, laws previously passed that were detrimental to workers were abolished, and elementary schools in rural areas were improved while the minimum instruction period was extended.

Another piece of legislation, the Worker Protection Act of 1936, regulated working hours in industry and mining, including granting public holidays, mandated health inspections for workers in "unhealthy" industries, and granted maternity leave as well as aid from public funds in cases of need. The same Act raised the age for admission to employment in industry, commerce, offices, and land transport from 14 to 15 years. Legislation was also enacted mandating inspections of electrical equipment in some industries. . An old-age pension was introduced for Norwegian citizens over 70 years old, together with pensions for blind and certain categories of crippled persons and mandatory health insurance for the crews of foreign-going vessels. The Act on the Disabled of June 1936 aimed to ensure (as noted by one study) “that disabled people receive medical treatment and the necessary education for self-help.” An Act of July 1936 concerning housing savings cooperatives aimed (as one study has noted) “to regulate companies or associations that accept deposits from their members and lend the accumulated funds to other members for the acquisition or improvement of their own homes or apartments.”

An Act of June 1938 empowered the government (as noted by one study) “to issue regulations dealing with the length of working hours and with medical inspection of workers exposed to X-rays, radium and the radio-active substances.” An Act of April 1938 provided (as noted by one study) “that any company or private undertaking with a share capital or net assets amounting to 100,000 crowns must make appropriations to a Labour Fund.” The money from this fund would be used (as one study has noted) “for payment of old-age and invalidity pensions or for relief of unemployment due to the suspension, transformation or restriction of the work of the undertaking.” Also in 1938, a mandatory unemployment insurance program was adopted. An Act and Decree of March 1939 regulated inspection on board ship, while an Act of May 1939 amending the compulsory sickness insurance scheme dispensed the insured persons (as noted by one study) “from the need for advancing the doctors' fees and enables the funds to exercise more effective supervision than in the past over the treatment given by the doctors.” Improved welfare provisions for seamen were also introduced, while an Act of May 1939 sought to secure improved supervision of home work.

Nygaardsvold was elected to the Storting for the last time in the autumn of 1945. At the end of the Storting term in 1949, he retired from politics. That year, he was awarded the Medal for Outstanding Civic Service (Borgerdådsmedaljen). He returned to Hommelvik and died of cancer in Trondheim in 1952. He was buried at Hommelvik Church in Malvik Municipality.

== Historical legacy ==
During his time in office, Nygaardsvold had immense popular appeal and was given credit for the Labour Party's election results in 1933. Nygaardsvold was the prime minister in the second Labour Party cabinet in Norway, after he helped formulate the so-called "crisis accord" with the Farmers' Party. His government's domestic policy was largely dedicated to recovering from the Great Depression but is most noted for its foreign and military policy in the years leading up to the occupation of Norway by Nazi Germany and his administration in exile from 1940 to 1945. The investigative commission that issued a report after the liberation of Norway found that he could not be absolved from responsibility for the lack of operational readiness for the German invasion but gave him credit for his management of a unity government in exile. He was awarded an honorary salary for his service in exile but refused to accept it.

== Other sources ==
- Berntsen, Harald (1991) I malstrømmen : Johan Nygaardsvold 1879–1952 (Oslo: Aschehoug) ISBN 9788203228896.

== Related reading ==
- Andenaes, Johs; Riste, Olav; Skodvin, Magne (1966) Norway and the Second World War (Oslo: Johan Grundt Tanum Forlag).

Political offices
Preceded by Johan Ludwig Mowinckel	Prime Minister of Norway; 1935–1945	Succeeded by Einar Gerhardsen
