= Sneisen =

Village in Malvik Municipality, Norway

- Village
- Interactive map of Sneisen
- Location within Trøndelag Location within Norway
- Coordinates: 63.3349°N 10.8097°E
- Country: Norway
- Region: Central Norway
- County: Trøndelag
- District: Trondheim Region
- Municipality: Malvik Municipality
- Elevation: 273 m (896 ft)
- Time zone: UTC+01:00 (CET)
  - Summer (DST): UTC+02:00 (CEST)
- Post Code: 7550 Hommelvik

Sneisen is a village in Malvik Municipality in Trøndelag county, Norway. It is located in the Mostadmarka area in the southern part of the municipality, about 10 kilometres (6.2 mi) south of the village of Hommelvik and 12 kilometres (7.5 mi) north of the village of Selbustrand (in neighboring Selbu Municipality). Mostadmark Chapel is located in the village.
