= Smiskaret =

Village in Malvik Municipality, Norway

Smiskaret Smiskardet
- Village
- Interactive map of Smiskaret
- Location within Trøndelag Location within Norway
- Coordinates: 63.4289°N 10.7439°E
- Country: Norway
- Region: Central Norway
- County: Trøndelag
- District: Trondheim Region
- Municipality: Malvik Municipality

Area
  - Total: 0.46 km^{2} (0.18 sq mi)
- Elevation: 87 m (285 ft)

Population (2000)
  - Total: 1,093
  - Density: 2,376/km^{2} (6,150/sq mi)
- Time zone: UTC+01:00 (CET)
  - Summer (DST): UTC+02:00 (CEST)
- Post Code: 7550 Hommelvik

Smiskaret or Smiskardet is a village in Malvik Municipality in Trøndelag county, Norway. The village is located along the Stjørdalsfjorden, an arm of the Trondheimsfjord, about 4 kilometres (2.5 mi) northwest of the village of Hommelvik.

The 0.46-square-kilometre (110-acre) village had a population (2000) of 1,093 and a population density of 2,376 inhabitants per square kilometre (6,150/sq mi). Since 2000, the population and area data for this village area has not been separately tracked by Statistics Norway, but rather it has been considered part of the Hommelvik urban area.
