= Kvenvær Church =

Church in Trøndelag, Norway

- Kvenvær kirke
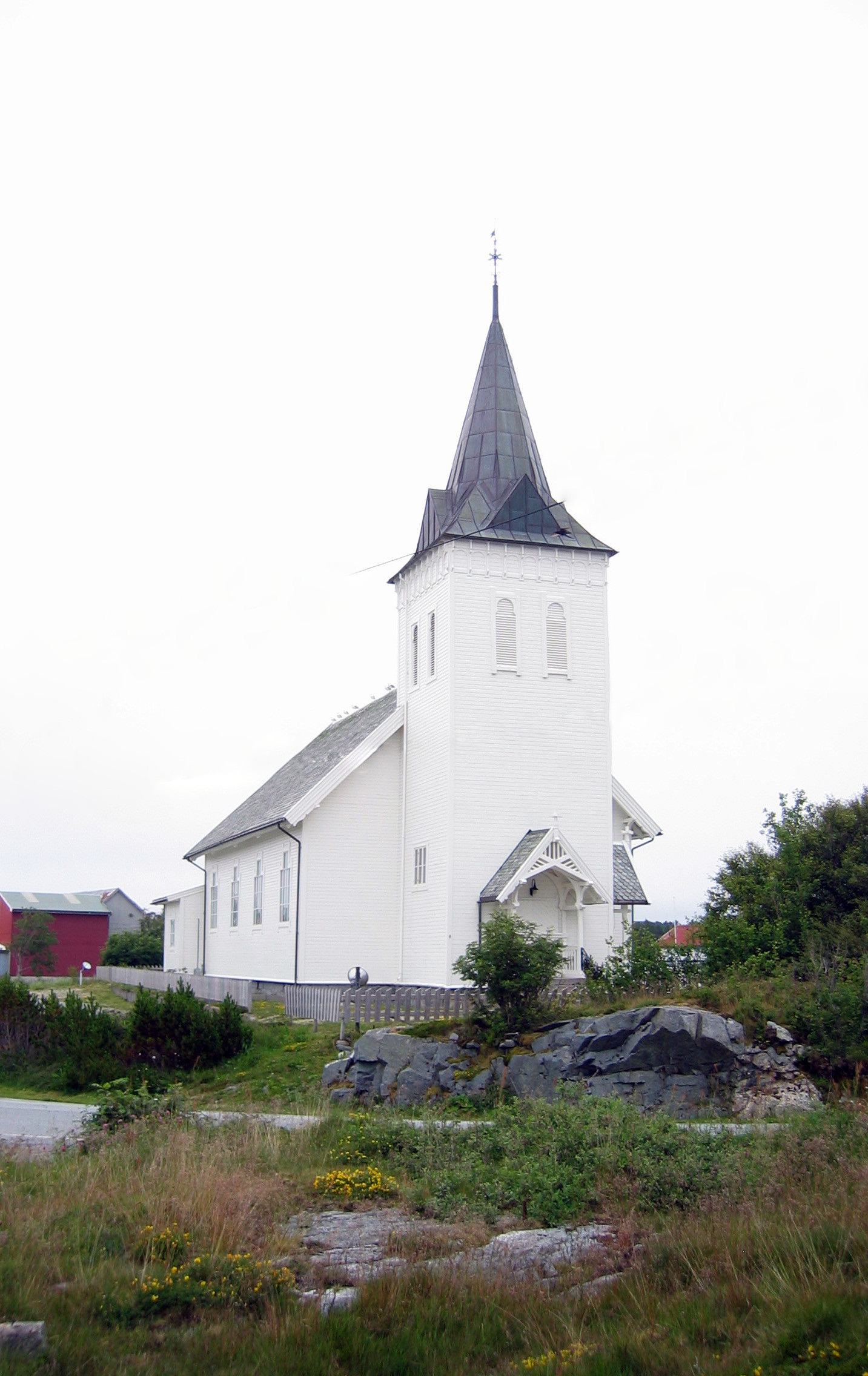
- View of the church
- Kvenvær Church
- 63.5298271626°N 08.381858915°E
- Location: Hitra Municipality, Trøndelag
- Country: Norway
- Denomination: Church of Norway
- Churchmanship: Evangelical Lutheran

History
- Status: Parish church
- Founded: 15th century
- Consecrated: 9 Dec 1909

Architecture
- Functional status: Active
- Architect: Nils Ryjord
- Architectural type: Long church
- Completed: 1909 (117 years ago)

Specifications
- Capacity: 500
- Materials: Wood

Administration
- Diocese: Nidaros bispedømme
- Deanery: Orkdal prosti
- Parish: Kvenvær og Sandstad
- Norwegian Cultural Heritage Site
- Type: Church
- Status: Not protected
- ID: 84861

Kvenvær Church (Norwegian: Kvenvær kirke) is a parish church of the Church of Norway in Hitra Municipality in Trøndelag county, Norway. It is located in the village of Kvenvær on the northwestern coast of the island of Hitra. It is one of the churches for the Kvenvær og Sandstad parish which is part of the Orkdal prosti (deanery) in the Diocese of Nidaros. The white, wooden church was built in a long church design in 1909 using plans drawn up by the architect Nils Ryjord. The church seats about 500 people.

== History ==
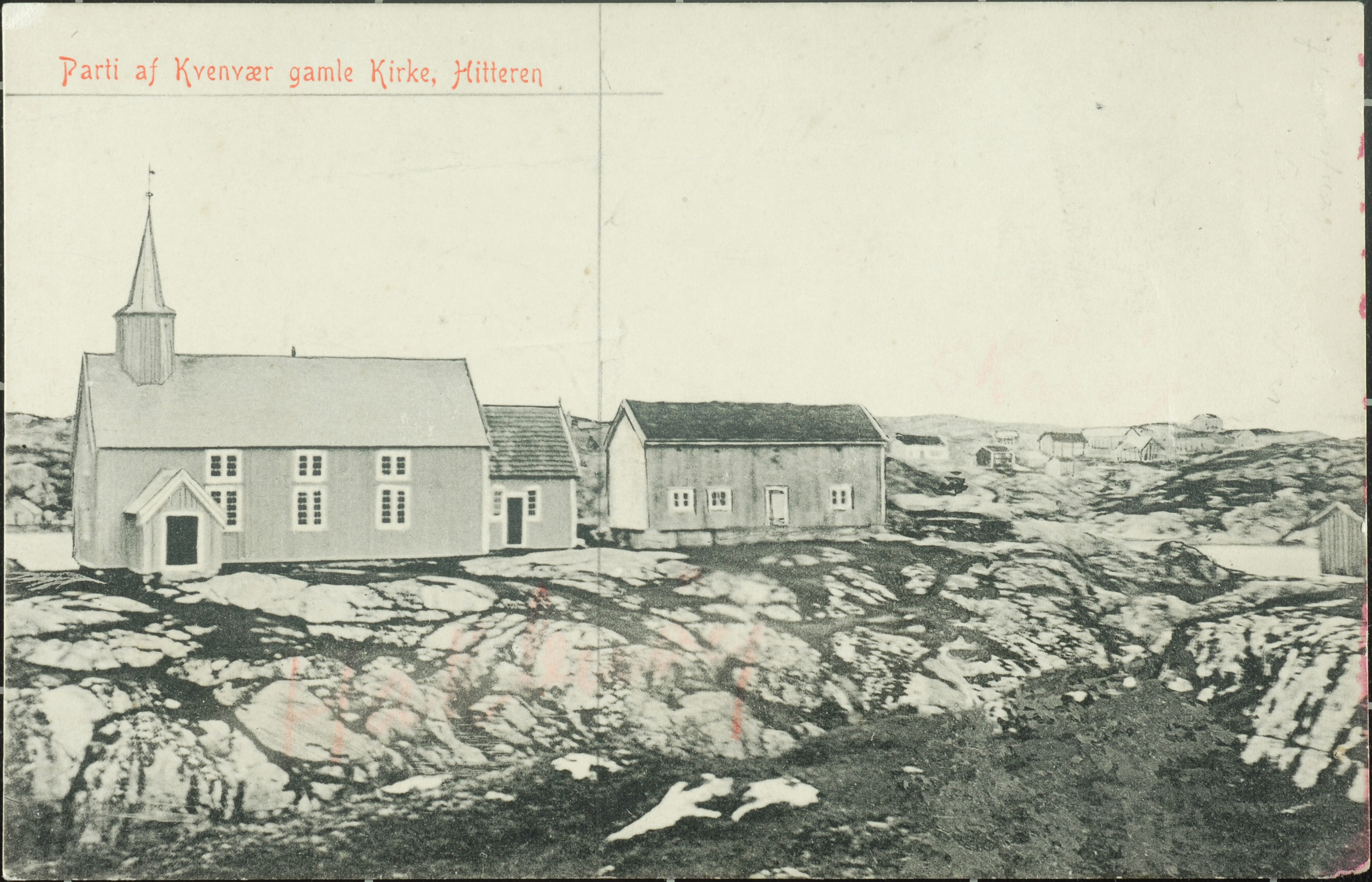
Photo of the old church (1400s-1934).

The earliest existing historical records of the church date back to the year 1589, but the church was not new that year. The first church was likely a wooden stave church that was built during the mid-1400s. It was originally located on the northwestern shore of the small island of Hakkebuøya about 5 kilometres (3.1 mi) to the southwest of the village of Kvenvær on the main island of Hitra. The island on which the church was located was surrounded by dozens of other small islands which were collectively referred to as the Kvenvær islands, hence the name of the church. According to parish priest Rosing's report to the diocesan leaders, the church was almost completely restored in 1703, when most of the wood including the roof, north wall, and floor were all rotting due to the exposed sea air.

In 1732, the people of the parish petitioned for permission to build a graveyard at the church so that they wouldn't need to travel to Dolm Church to bury their dead. Permission for the graveyard was granted. The people of the parish were very happy, but soon after, problems were discovered with the site. The rocky land had a thin layer of soil on it, so coffins could not be buried as deep as they should have been, so farm animals such as pigs would dig around and leave exposed coffins; consequently, the graveyard had to be fence in. During burials, locals had to bring sand and dirt to cover the coffins with and sometimes, they just piled rocks all over the coffin when soil wasn't available. The church established a couple of smaller auxiliary cemeteries on the nearby islands of Rørøya and Gangstøa.

On 20 July 1756, the church was struck by lightning and it quickly burned down. After the fire, there was some deliberations, but it was decided to build a new long church on the same site. The new church was completed and consecrated on 14 July 1763 by the parish priest Ludvig Frederich Broch, who was said to have been disappointed because the bishop did not show up on this occasion. The building's nave originally measured 9.1 by 5.7 metres (30 ft × 19 ft) and it had a choir that was 4.1 by 4.2 metres (13 ft × 14 ft). The church originally had seats for about 80 people. It did not have a tower or a sacristy. In 1876, the nave was extended by about 5.1 metres (17 ft) and a second floor seating gallery was added to add more seating to the church, bringing the church to a capacity of about 170 people.

Around 1900, the parish began looking into the idea of moving the church site to the main island of Hitra so it would be more accessible to the population and because they wanted a more suitable site for the parish cemetery. The decision to move the church was approved by royal decree on 14 March 1908 and the church was to be built on the Steine farm in the village of Kvenvær. The new church was consecrated on 9 December 1909 and it replaced the Old Kvenvær Church which had been located on the island of Hakkebuøya about 5 kilometres (3.1 mi) to the southwest of the village of Kvenvær on the main island of Hitra. The old church site had been there from the mid-15th century until it was closed in 1909. In 1934, the old church was deconstructed and moved to the village of Forsnes where it was rebuilt and renamed Forsnes Chapel.

== See also ==
- List of churches in Nidaros
