= Arne Herjuaune =

Norwegian speed skater

Personal information
- Nationality: Norwegian
- Born: 7 October 1945 Malvik Municipality, Norway
- Died: 21 March 2017 (aged 71)

Sport
- Sport: Speed skating
- Club: Trondhjems SK

Arne Herjuaune (7 October 1945 – 21 March 2017) was a Norwegian speed skater. He was born in Malvik Municipality and represented Trondhjems SK. He competed at the 1968 Winter Olympics in Grenoble, where he shared 5th in the 500 metres.
