= Hundhammeren =

Village in Malvik Municipality, Norway

- Village
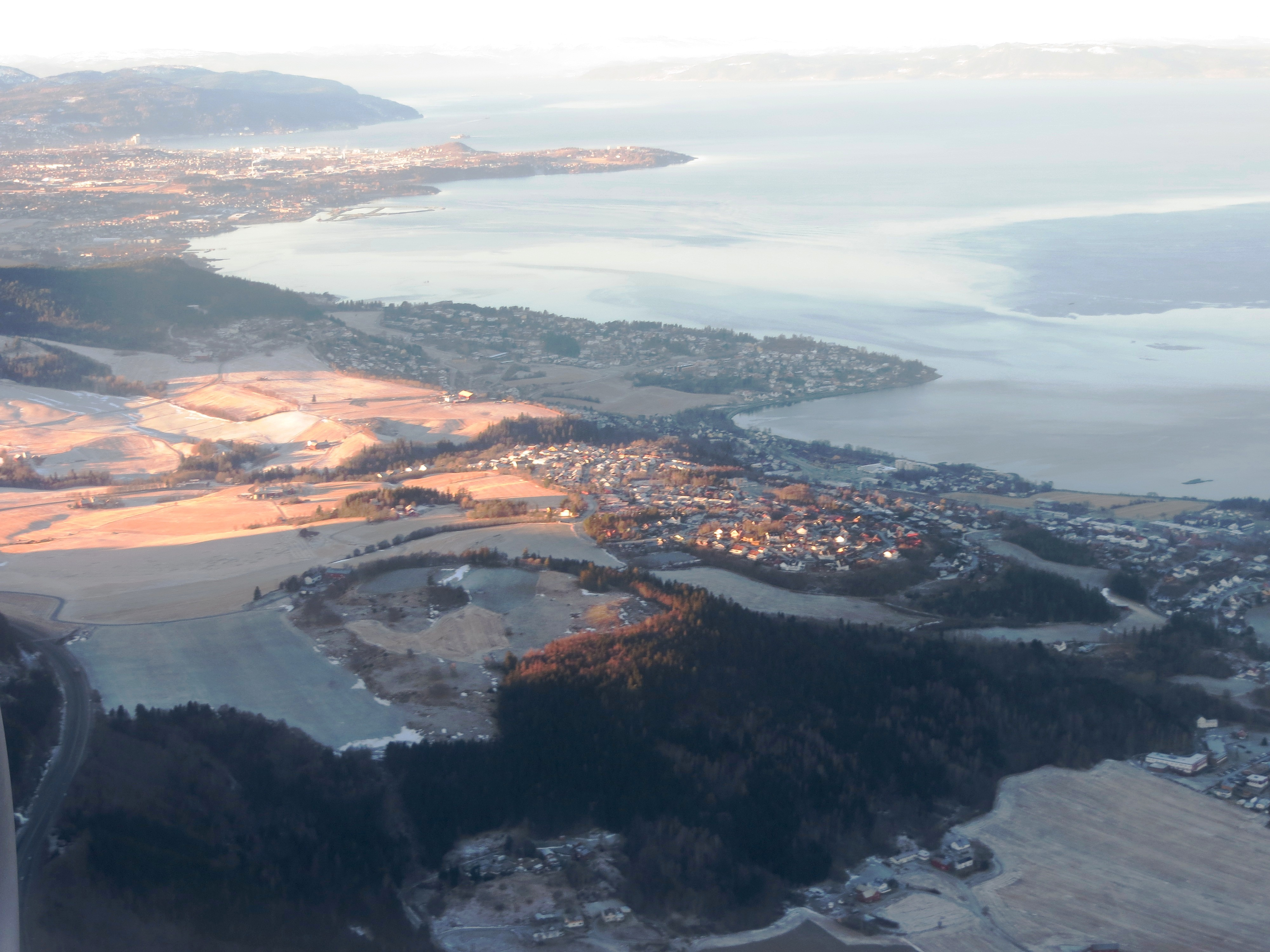
- View of the village
- Interactive map of Hundhammeren
- Location within Trøndelag Location within Norway
- Coordinates: 63.4395°N 10.5998°E
- Country: Norway
- Region: Central Norway
- County: Trøndelag
- District: Trondheim Region
- Municipality: Malvik Municipality
- Elevation: 42 m (138 ft)
- Time zone: UTC+01:00 (CET)
  - Summer (DST): UTC+02:00 (CEST)
- Post Code: 7562 Hundhammeren

Hundhammeren is a village in Malvik Municipality in Trøndelag county, Norway. The village is located along an arm of the Trondheimsfjord, about 1.5 kilometres (0.93 mi) west of the village of Vikhammer and about 4 kilometres (2.5 mi) east of the village of Ranheim (in Trondheim Municipality).

The villages of Hundhammeren, Vikhammer, Saksvik (all in Malvik Municipality), and Væretrøa (in Trondheim Municipality) together form a single urban area called Malvik which crosses the municipal border. The 2.68-square-kilometre (660-acre) urban area has a population (2024) of 7,538 and a population density of 2,813 inhabitants per square kilometre (7,290/sq mi). This area is the most populous urban area in the municipality.
