= Kristine Nøstmo =

Norwegian footballer (born 1993)

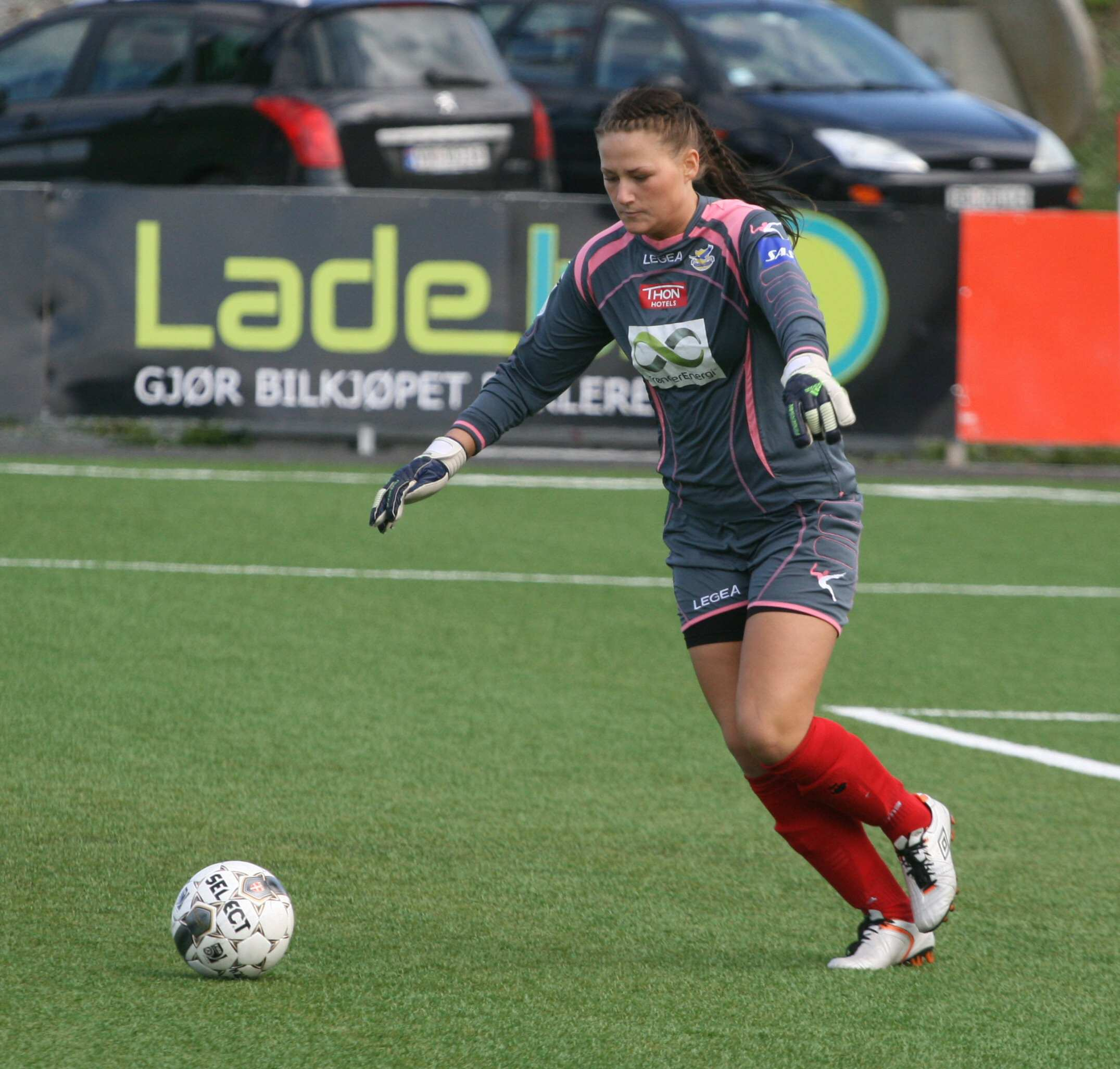
- Nøstmo in 2012

Personal information
- Date of birth: 8 June 1993 (age 33)
- Height: 1.82 m (6 ft 0 in)
- Position: Goalkeeper

Youth career
- –2010: Hommelvik

Senior career*
Years	Team	Apps	(Gls)
2011	Malvik		
2012–	Trondheims-Ørn/Rosenborg	192	(1)

International career^{‡}
2012	Norway u-19	3	(0)
2015	Norway u-23	1	(0)
2017	Norway	1	(0)
- * Club domestic league appearances and goals as of 1 January 2022 ‡ National team caps and goals as of 1 January 2022

Kristine Nøstmo (born 8 June 1993) is a retired Norwegian football goalkeeper who spent almost her entire career in Toppserien side Rosenborg.

She played junior football for Hommelvik IL and senior football for Malvik IL before joining SK Trondheims-Ørn in 2012. The team changed its name to Rosenborg in 2020.

She made her debut for the Norway women's national football team in the 2017 Algarve Cup, keeping a clean sheet against Portugal. In 2018 she retired from international play, citing several comments made by national team officials about body weight.
