= 1900 World Allround Speed Skating Championships =

International speed skating competition

World Allround Speed Skating Championships
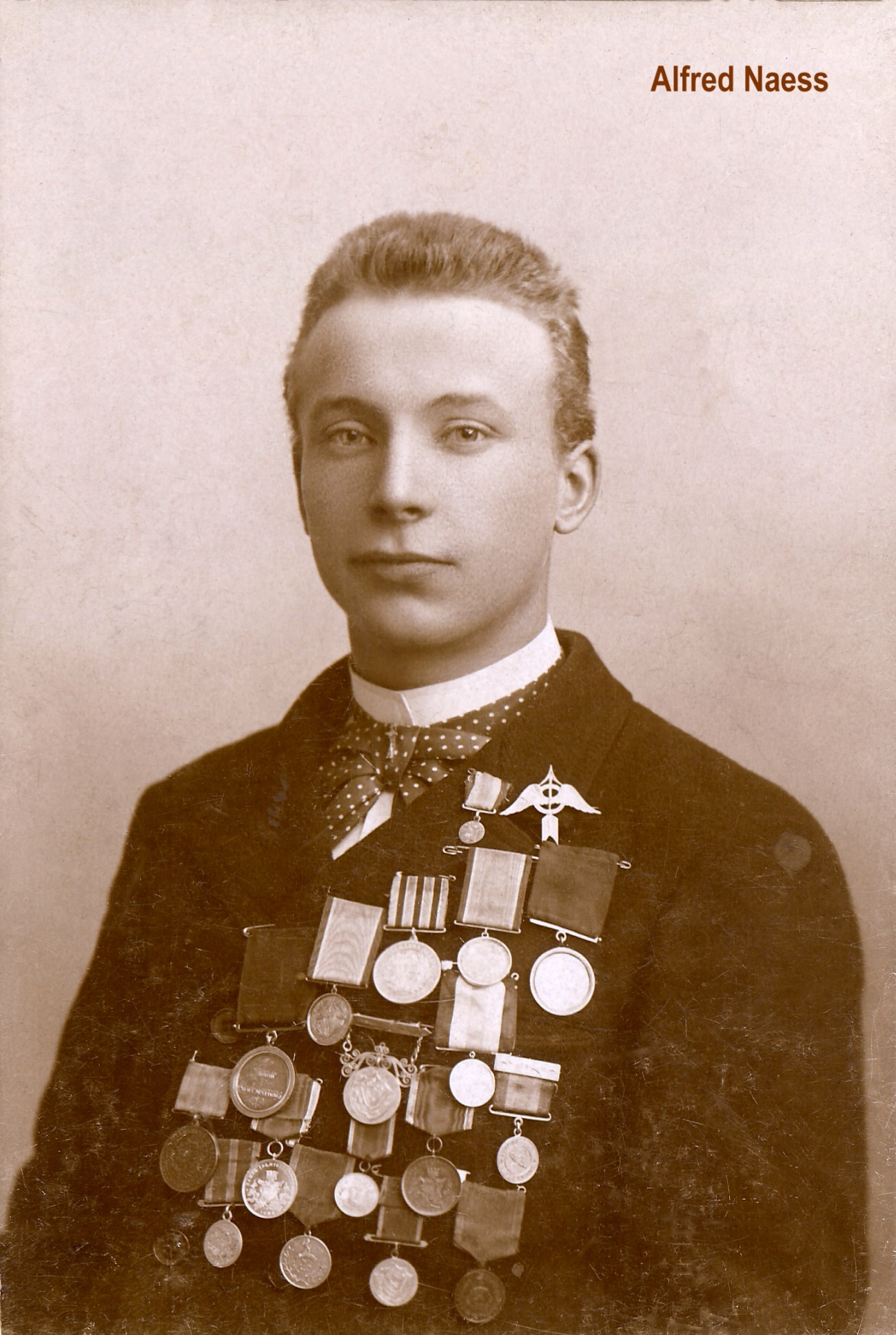
- Alfred Næss; Participated in the 1900 World Championship
- Venue: Frognerkilen, Kristiania, Norway
- Dates: 24–25 February
- Competitors: 12 from 1 nations

Medalist men
1st place, gold medalist(s)		Edvard Engelsaas	NOR

The 1900 World Allround Speed Skating Championships took place at 24 and 25 February 1900 at the ice rinks Frognerkilen in Kristiania (Today: Oslo), Norway. The first day was skated at the ice rink Friedenauer Sportplatz (a 400 m ice rink). Due to the bad ice conditions the second day the distances were skated at the ice rink Westeisbahn (a 335 m ice rink).

Peder Østlund was the defending champion, after 2 distances he stopped. Edvard Engelsaas won three distances and became the new World champion.

== Allround results ==
Place	Athlete	Country	500m	5000m	1500m	10000m
1st place, gold medalist(s)	Edvard Engelsaas	Norway	47.4 (3)	9:34.2 (1)	2:38.4 (1)	20:09.4 (1)
NC2	Alfred Næss	Norway	47.2 (2)	9:59.2 (7)	2:42.0 (2)	20:49.2 (4)
NC3	Rudolf Gundersen	Norway	50.2 (5)	9:49.0 (3)	2:43.0 (3)	20:36.6 (3)
NC4	Carl Frantzen	Norway	52.2 (10)	9:55.6 (5)	2:46.4 (4)	20:12.2 (2)
NC5	Thorvald Thomsen	Norway	51.2 (7)	9:54.8 (4)	2:46.6 (5)	20:59.8 (5)
NC6	Rudolf Røhne	Norway	50.2 (5)	9:58.8 (6)	2:50.8 (8)	22:11.4 (8)
NC7	Hans Johansen	Norway	55.4 (11)	10:08.0 (10)	3:01.2 (10)	21:13.4 (6)
NC8	Olaf Johansen	Norway	56.0 (12)	10:14.4 (12)		21:20.2 (7)
NC	Asbjørn Bye	Norway	50.0 (4)	10:06.8 (9)	2:49.8 (6)	NS
NC	Leonhard Kristoffersen	Norway	51.8 (8)	10:09.4 (11)	2:53.8 (9)	NS
NC	John Skjefstad	Norway	52.0 (9)	10:01.6 (8)	2:50.0 (7)	NS
NC	Peder Østlund	Norway	46.4 (1)	9:43.0 (2)	NS	NS

* = Fell
NC = Not classified
NF = Not finished
NS = Not started
DQ = Disqualified

Source: SpeedSkatingStats.com

== Rules ==
Four distances have to be skated:

- 500m
- 1500m
- 5000m
- 10000m

One could only win the World Championships by winning at least three of the four distances, so there would be no World Champion if no skater won at least three distances.

Silver and bronze medals were not awarded.
