= Ingrid Aune =

Norwegian politician (1985–2019)

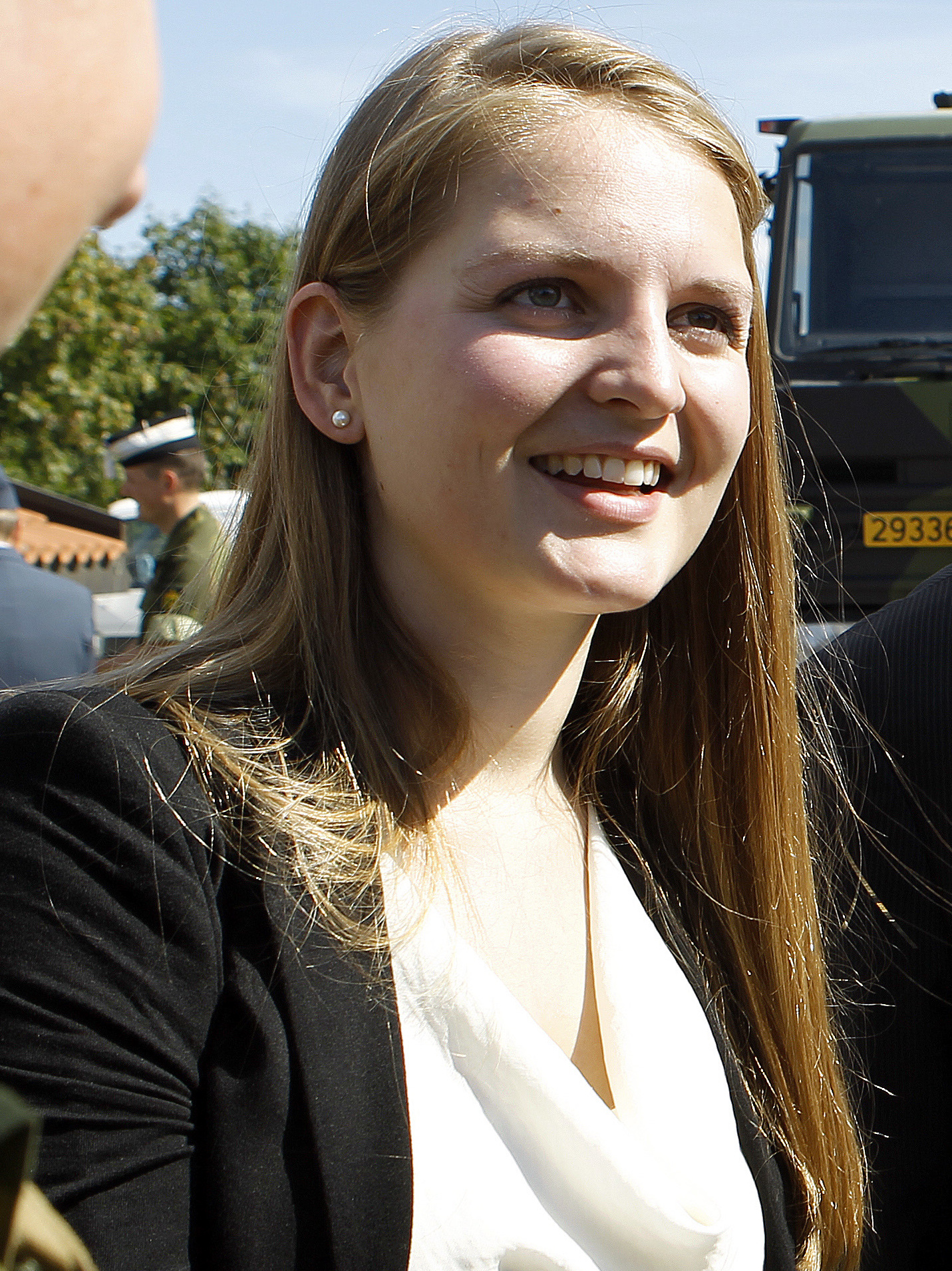
- Born: 19 October 1985; Stavanger
- Died: 1 August 2019 (aged 33); Namsos
- Education: University of Oslo, University of Wisconsin-Madison
- Occupation: Politician
- Known for: Mayor of Malvik Municipality
- Partner: Eivind Olav Kjelbotn Evensen

Ingrid Johansen Aune (19 October 1985 in Stavanger – 1 August 2019 in Namsos) was a Norwegian politician who was mayor of Malvik Municipality from 2015 until her death.

== Life ==
Aune was born in 1985 in Stavanger. She earned a degree in International Relations and Economics from the University of Oslo in 2010, later completing her studies at the University of Wisconsin-Madison. She was a member of the Labour Party and she had been a political adviser whilst Jens Stoltenberg was Prime Minister.

On 15 May 2012 she became political adviser to Minister of State Espen Barth Eide and part of the leadership of the Ministry of Defense. She moved on to a similar position in the Ministry of Foreign Affairs in September.

She and her partner Eivind Olav Kjelbotn Evensen died on 1 August 2019 after a boat accident on the outskirts of Namsos. She was 33 years old. She had been flown to Namsos Hospital but died after her arrival.
