= Forsnes =

Village in Hitra Municipality, Norway

- Village
- Interactive map of Forsnes
- Location within Trøndelag Location within Norway
- Coordinates: 63.4322°N 08.4152°E
- Country: Norway
- Region: Central Norway
- County: Trøndelag
- District: Fosen
- Municipality: Hitra Municipality
- Elevation: 5 m (16 ft)
- Time zone: UTC+01:00 (CET)
  - Summer (DST): UTC+02:00 (CEST)
- Post Code: 7243 Kvenvær

Forsnes is a village in Hitra Municipality in Trøndelag county, Norway. It is located on the southwestern corner of the island of Hitra, along the Trondheimsleia. It is about 15 kilometres (9.3 mi) south of the village of Kvenvær and about 35 kilometres (22 mi) west of the village of Sandstad. The mountain Mørkdalstua (tallest mountain on Hitra island) lies about 8 kilometres (5.0 mi) northeast of Forsnes. The population of the village is about 80.

In 1961, Forsnes was connected to the nearby city of Kristiansund by ferry, the first regular ferry connection to the island. The ferry was discontinued in the fall of 2008 after a short trial period as a summer only route.

Forsnes Chapel is the oldest wooden church on the island of Hitra, dating back to 1763.
