= Torgeir Moan =

Norwegian professor

- Born: 2 June 1944 (age 82); Malvik Municipality, Norway
- Education: Norwegian Institute of Technology
- Occupations: engineer and professor of marine technology
- Employer: Norwegian University of Science and Technology

Torgeir Moan (born 1944) is a Norwegian engineer and professor of marine technology at the Norwegian University of Science and Technology.

== Career ==
Born on 2 June 1944, Moan graduated as a construction engineer in 1968 and as a doctorate in 1975. He was appointed professor at the Norwegian University of Science and Technology from 1978.

He has worked with design and analysis of marine constructions such as ships, oil platforms, wind turbines and floating bridges often with specific focus on aspects of safety. He has published around 700 scientific publications.

Moan is a member of the Norwegian Academy of Science and Letters and of the Royal Academy of Engineering.
