= Malvik IL =

Norwegian sports club

- Full name: Malvik Idrettslag
- Founded: 1 February 1933
- Ground: Viksletta, Vikhammer
- League: 3. divisjon
Home colours

Malvik Idrettslag is a Norwegian multi-sports club from Malvik Municipality in Trøndelag county. It has sections for association football, team handball, athletics, orienteering, Nordic skiing, swimming, cycling and canoeing.

A club named Malvik IL was formed on 22 January 1933; the official founding date became 1 February. The club was a member of the Arbeidernes Idrettsforbund. After the occupation of Norway by Nazi Germany, during which the club was dormant, the club merged with IL Vidar, founded 7 November 1939. The club also got an influx of members from the club Malvik TIF, which had gone completely defunct during the occupation. The name Vidar was chosen as the club's name. However the Confederation of Sports (which had absorbed Arbeidernes Idrettsforbund) refused the name Vidar, and Malvik IL was chosen instead.

The men's football team plays in the Fourth Division (fifth tier). The club played in the Norwegian Third Division as late as in 2010.
