= Hommelvik IL =

Norwegian football club

- Full name: Hommelvik Idrettslag
- Founded: 15 September 1924
- Ground: Øya Mersalg arena, Hommelvik
- League: Fifth Division
Home colours

Hommelvik Idrettslag is a Norwegian sports club from Hommelvik, Trøndelag. It has sections for association football, team handball, basketball, track and field and Nordic skiing.

It was founded on 15 September 1924, and was a member of the Workers' Confederation of Sports. In 1953 it had no basketball section, but since then it has lost sections for speed skating, swimming and cycling.

The men's football team played in the Third Division, the fourth tier of Norwegian football in 2000. The team now plays in the Fifth Division.
