= Mostadmark Chapel =

Church in Trøndelag, Norway

- Mostadmark kapell
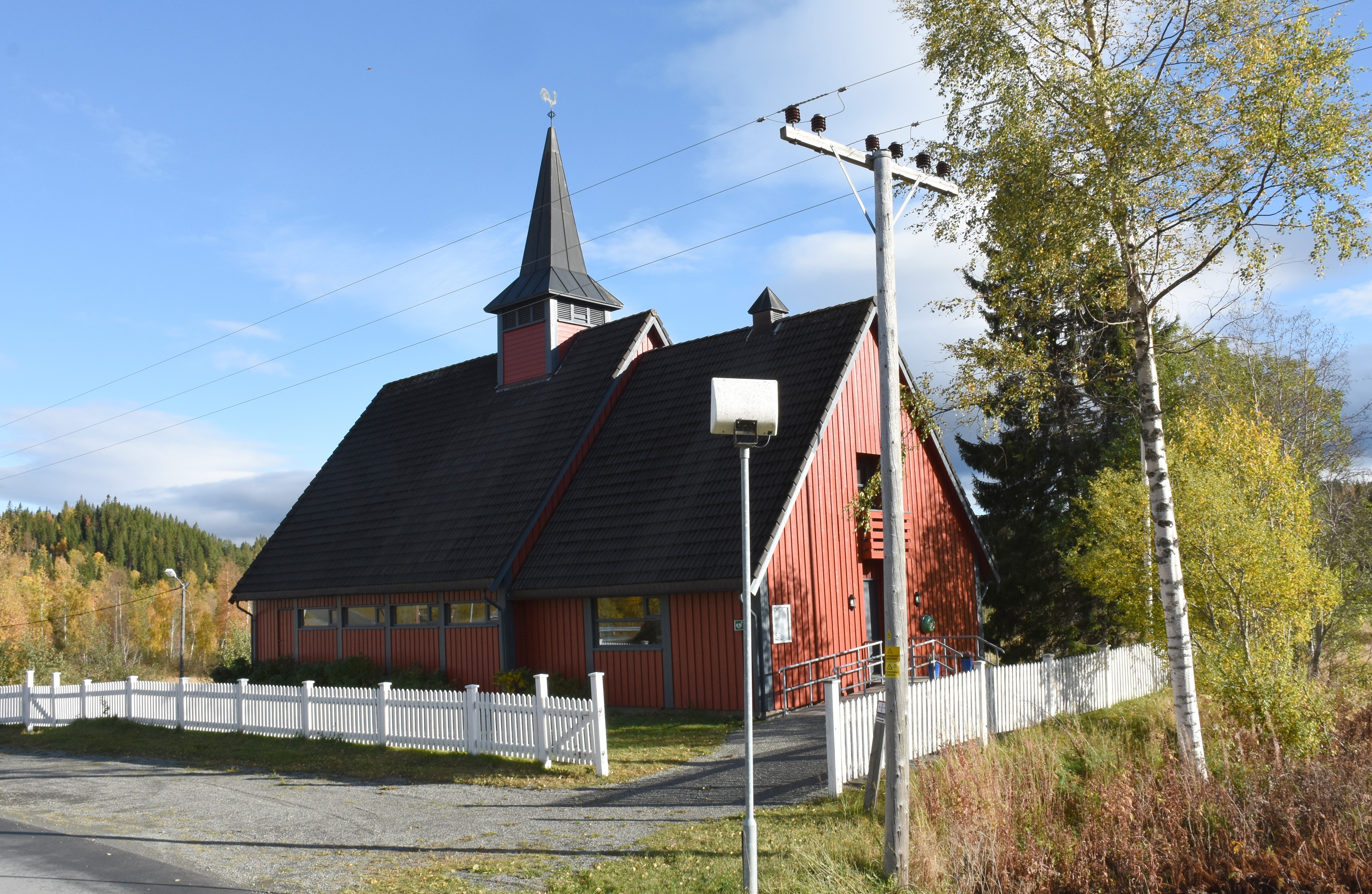
- View of the church
- Mostadmark Chapel
- 63.33212869°N 10.811998486°E
- Location: Malvik Municipality, Trøndelag
- Country: Norway
- Denomination: Church of Norway
- Churchmanship: Evangelical Lutheran

History
- Status: Parish church
- Founded: 1986
- Consecrated: 15 June 1986

Architecture
- Functional status: Active
- Architect(s): Risan & Risan
- Architectural type: Long church
- Completed: 1986 (40 years ago)

Specifications
- Capacity: 120
- Materials: Wood

Administration
- Diocese: Nidaros bispedømme
- Deanery: Stjørdal prosti
- Parish: Hommelvik

Mostadmark Chapel (Norwegian: Mostadmark kapell) is a parish church of the Church of Norway in Malvik Municipality in Trøndelag county, Norway. It is located in the village of Sneisen in the rural Mostadmarka area of southern Malvik. It one of the churches for the Hommelvik parish which is part of the Stjørdal prosti (deanery) in the Diocese of Nidaros. The red, wooden chapel was built in a long church style in 1986 by the architectural firm Risan & Risan. The chapel seats about 120 people.

The church was consecrated on 15 June 1986 by Bishop Kristen Kyrre Bremer.

== See also ==
- List of churches in Nidaros
