= Homla =

River in Trøndelag county, Norway

Location
- Country: Norway
- County: Trøndelag
- Municipality: Malvik Municipality

Physical characteristics
- Source: Foldsjøen
  - location: Malvik Municipality, Norway
  - coordinates: 63°20′25″N 10°46′50″E
  - elevation: 205 metres (673 ft)
- Mouth: Trondheimsfjord, Hommelvik
  - location: Malvik Municipality, Norway
  - coordinates: 63°24′38″N 10°47′39″E
  - elevation: 0 metres (0 ft)
- Length: 10 km (6.2 mi)
- Basin size: 156.3 km^{2} (60.3 sq mi)
- Discharge
  - average: 2.94 m^{3}/s (104 cu ft/s)

Basin features
- Tributaries
  - right: Nævra

Homla is a river in Malvik Municipality in Trøndelag county, Norway. The 10-kilometre (6.2 mi) long river begins when it flows out of the lake Foldsjøen and it ends when it empties into the Trondheimsfjorden at the village of Hommelvik.

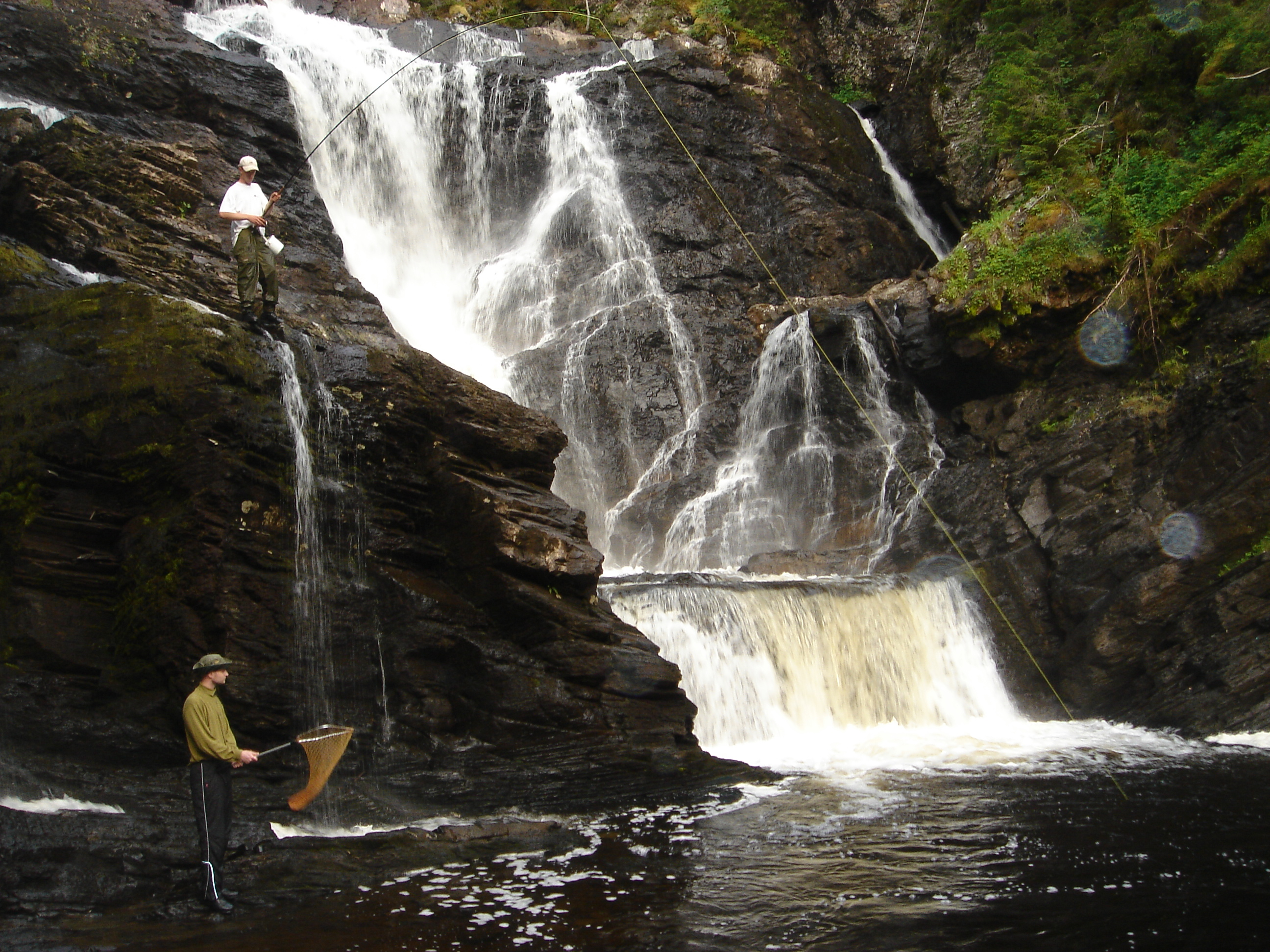
View of the Dølafossen waterfall on the river

The Homla was first used by the timber industry to transport recently cut trees, but it is now just a small river with good fishing opportunities. Small-sized salmon and sea trout can be caught here.

Around the year 2000, there were plans for constructing a large dam over the river's largest waterfall, "Storfossen". Due to local opposition, these plans were eventually aborted.

== See also ==
- List of rivers in Norway
