= Vikhammer Station =

Train station in Trøndelag, Norway

Vikhammer Station Vikhammer stasjon
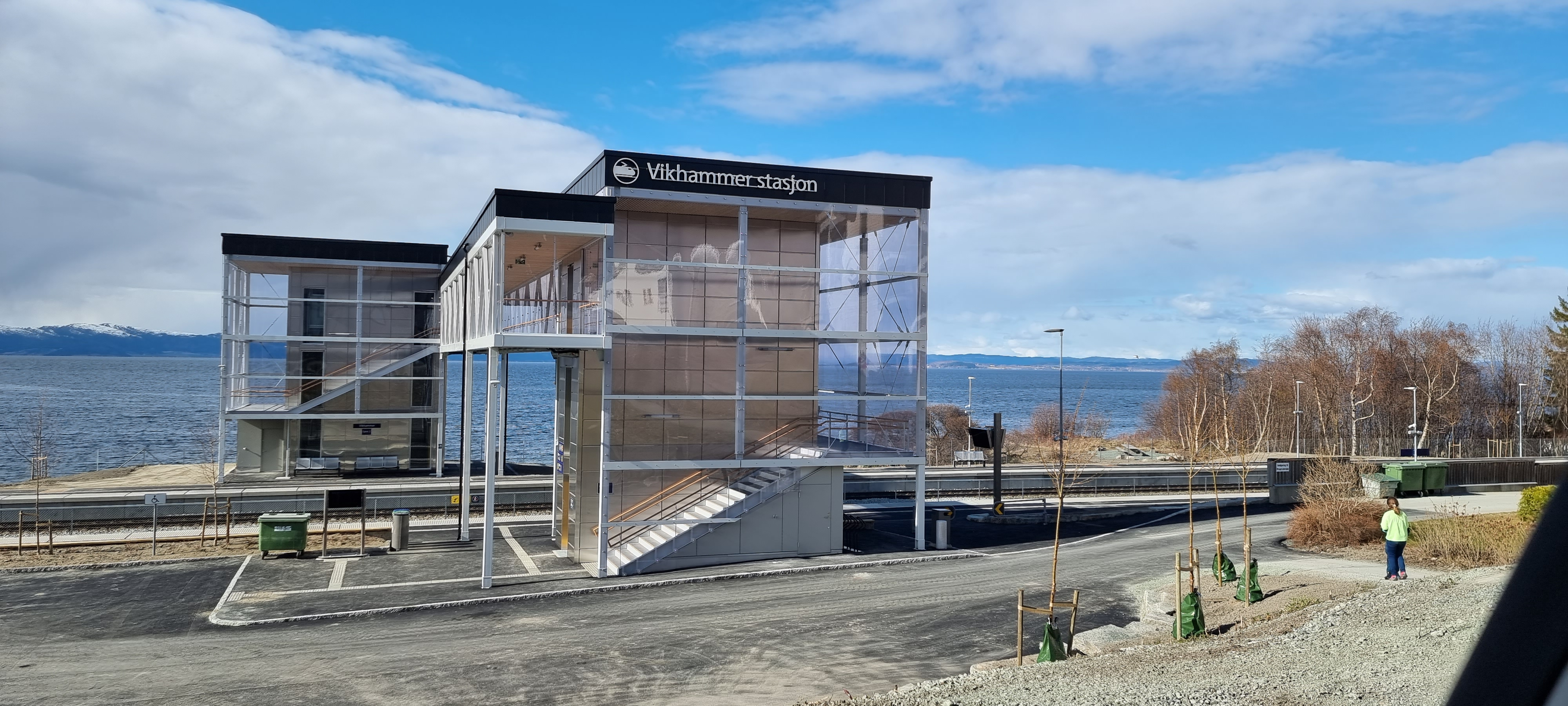
- View of the station

General information
- Location: Vikhammer, Malvik Municipality; Trøndelag; Norway
- Coordinates: 63.4373°N 10.6266°E
- Elevation: 7.5 metres (25 ft) above sea level
- System: Railway station
- Owner: Bane NOR
- Operator: SJ Norge
- Line: Nordlandsbanen
- Distance: 23.14 kilometres (14.38 mi)
- Platforms: 2

History
- Opened: 1881
Location
- Location within Trøndelag Location within Norway

Vikhammer Station is a railway station located in the village of Vikhammer in Malvik Municipality in Trøndelag county, Norway. The station is located about 13 kilometres (8.1 mi) east of the city of Trondheim.

The station is on the Nordland Line. The station is served hourly by the Trøndelag Commuter Rail service between Steinkjer Station and Trondheim Central Station. The unstaffed station is operated by SJ Norge.

== History ==
The station was built as part of the Meråker Line in 1893. The station was closed from 1985 until the mid-1990s when it was opened once again. The name was originally Vikhammer, but from 1926 it was changed to Vikhamar. In 2007, the name was switched back to Vikhammer.

Preceding station	Regional trains	Following station
Trondheim S Terminus	R71	Hommelvik towards Storlien
Preceding station	Local trains	Following station
Ranheim	Trøndelag Commuter Rail	Hommelvik
