= Trondhjems SK (skating) =

Norwegian skating club

Trondhjems Skøiteklub is a Norwegian sports club from Trondheim, founded in 1876. It has sections for figure skating and speed skating.

Former members include Peder Østlund, Edvard Engelsaas, Oluf Steen, Astri Mæhre Johannessen, Martin Sæterhaug, Ivar Ballangrud, Magne Thomassen and Rolf Falk-Larssen.
