= Malvik Church =

Church in Trøndelag, Norway

- Malvik kirke
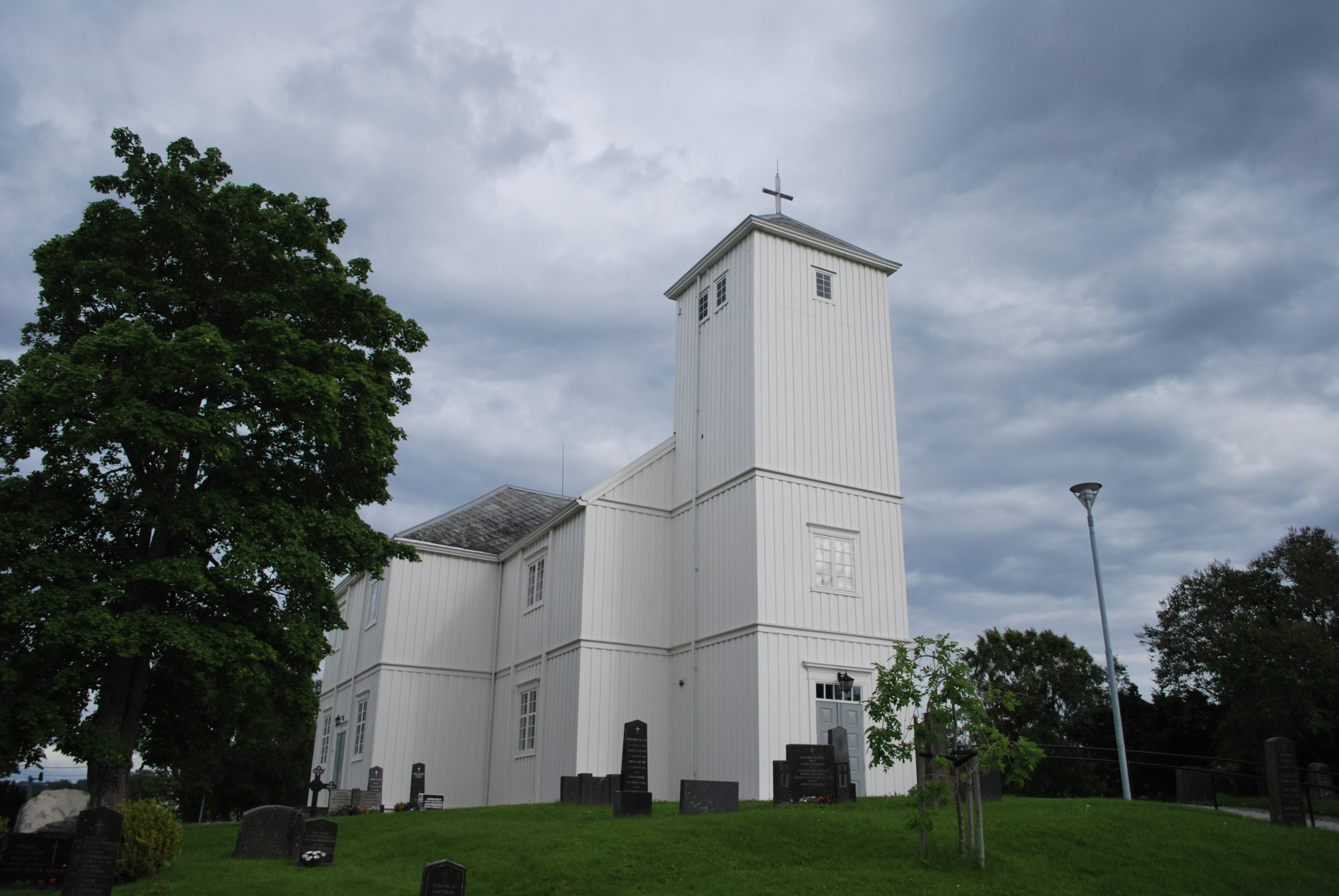
- View of the church
- Malvik Church
- 63.432974591°N 10.6730340421°E
- Location: Malvik Municipality, Trøndelag
- Country: Norway
- Denomination: Church of Norway
- Churchmanship: Evangelical Lutheran

History
- Status: Parish church
- Founded: 14th century
- Consecrated: 18 Nov 1846

Architecture
- Functional status: Active
- Architect: G.O. Olsen
- Architectural type: Cruciform
- Completed: 1846 (180 years ago)

Specifications
- Capacity: 550
- Materials: Wood

Administration
- Diocese: Nidaros bispedømme
- Deanery: Stjørdal prosti
- Parish: Malvik
- Norwegian Cultural Heritage Site
- Type: Church
- Status: Automatically protected
- ID: 84382

Malvik Church (Norwegian: Malvik kirke) is a parish church of the Church of Norway in Malvik Municipality in Trøndelag county, Norway. It is located in the village of Malvik. It is the church for the Malvik parish which is part of the Stjørdal prosti (deanery) in the Diocese of Nidaros. The white, wooden church was built in a cruciform style in 1846 by the architect G.O. Olsen. The church seats about 550 people.

== History ==
The earliest existing historical records of the church date back to the year 1432, but the church was not new at that time. The original church was likely a wooden stave church with a rectangular nave and a narrower chancel that may have been built during the 14th century. That church had a tower on the roof near the west end of the church. In 1654, the old church was torn down and replaced with a new church on the same site. This new timber-framed building was consecrated in 1656. In 1843, the church was inspected and it was found to be in poor shape, so it was decided to replace the church building. In 1846, the old church was torn down and a new wooden, cruciform church was built on the same site. The new building was consecrated on 18 November 1846 by the Bishop Hans Riddervold.

== Media gallery ==
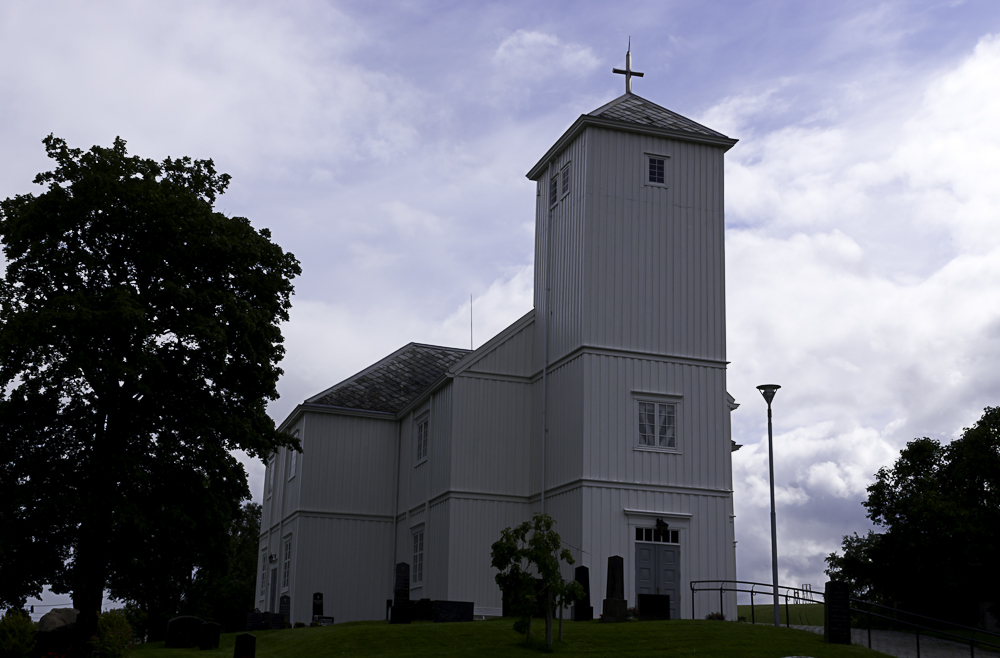

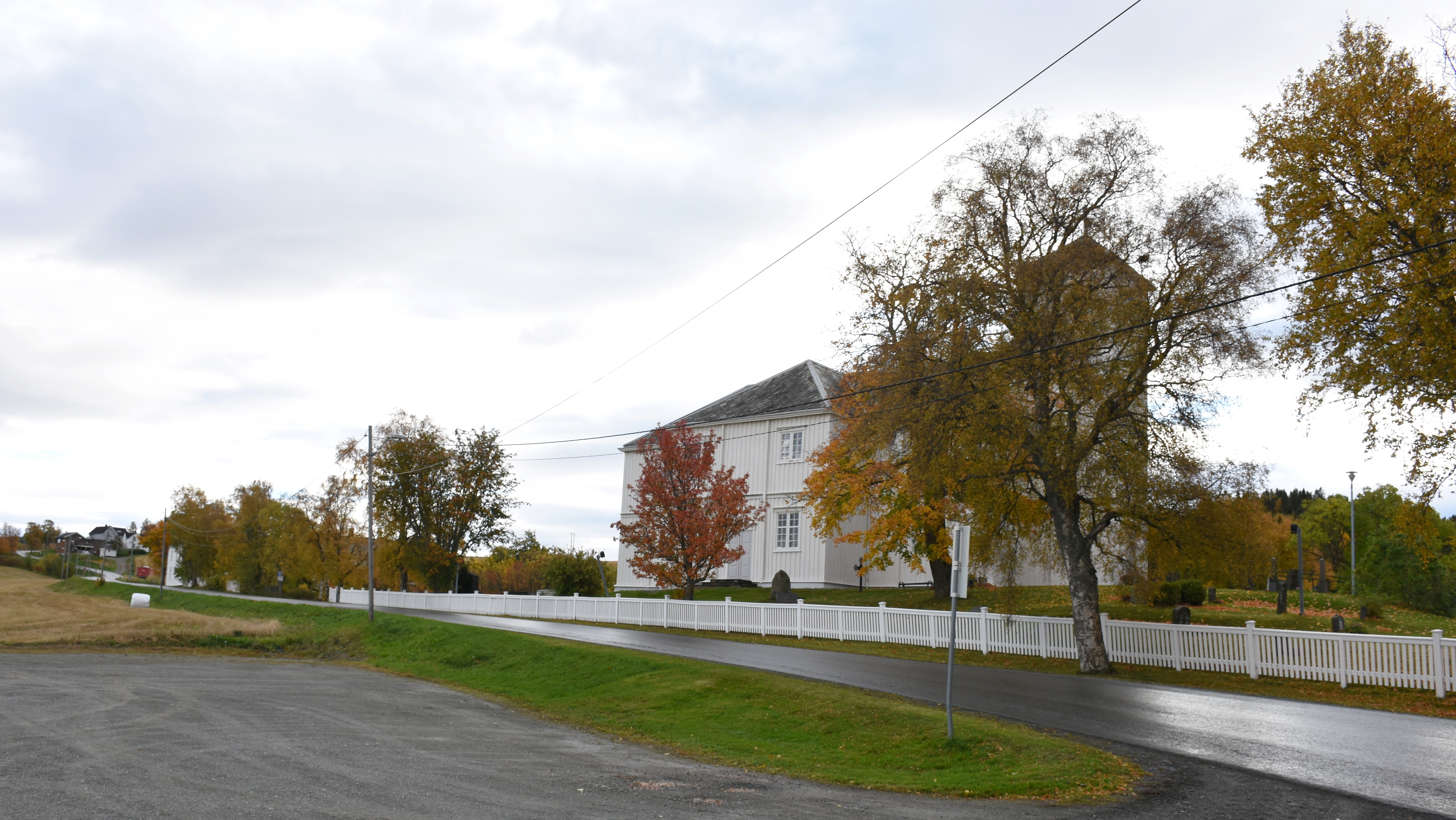

== See also ==
- List of churches in Nidaros
