= Hommelvik Church =

Church in Trøndelag, Norway

- Hommelvik kirke
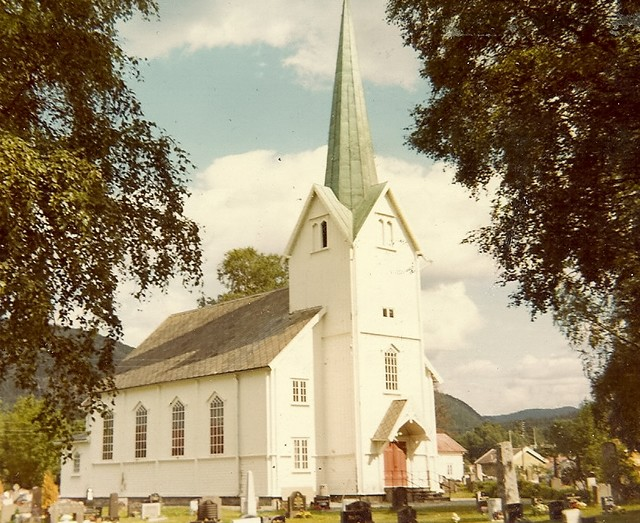
- View of the church
- Hommelvik Church
- 63.410826762°N 10.7973887622°E
- Location: Malvik Municipality, Trøndelag
- Country: Norway
- Denomination: Church of Norway
- Churchmanship: Evangelical Lutheran

History
- Status: Parish church
- Founded: 1886
- Consecrated: 25 May 1887

Architecture
- Functional status: Active
- Architect(s): Johan Wæhre; Osvald Magnus Günther
- Architectural type: Long church
- Completed: 1886 (140 years ago)

Specifications
- Capacity: 360
- Materials: Wood

Administration
- Diocese: Nidaros bispedømme
- Deanery: Stjørdal prosti
- Parish: Hommelvik
- Norwegian Cultural Heritage Site
- Type: Church
- Status: Not protected
- ID: 84621

Hommelvik Church (Norwegian: Hommelvik kirke) is a parish church of the Church of Norway in Malvik Municipality in Trøndelag county, Norway. It is located in the village of Hommelvik. It is one of the churches for the Hommelvik parish which is part of the Stjørdal prosti (deanery) in the Diocese of Nidaros. The white, wooden church was built in a long church style in 1886 by the architects Johan Wæhre and Osvald Magnus Günther. The church seats about 360 people.

== History ==
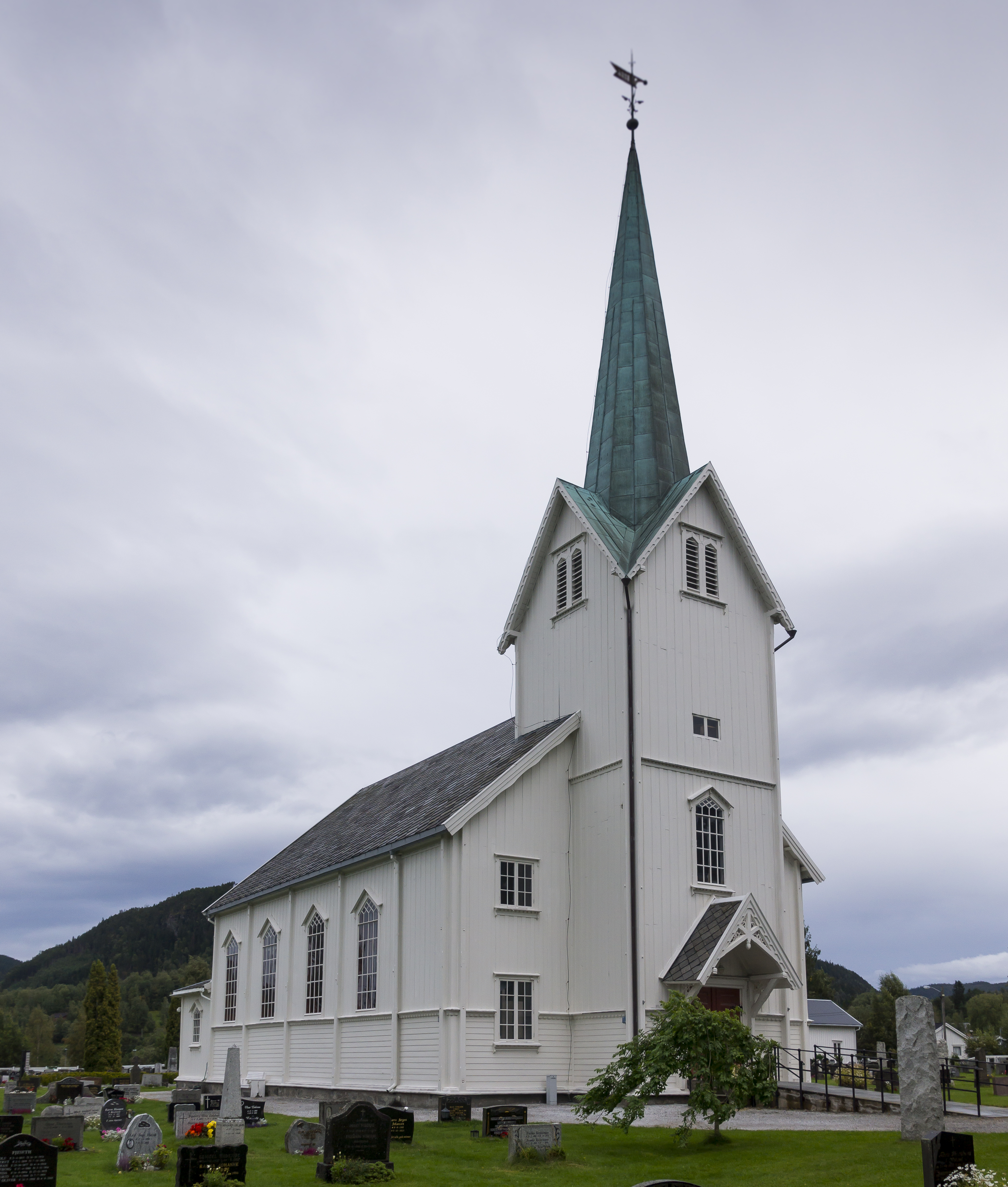
View of the church (2017)

The first church in Hommelvik was built in 1886. The new church was consecrated on 25 May 1887 by the Bishop Niels Laache. In 1950, the church was extensively restored under the direction of John Egil Tverdahl.

== See also ==
- List of churches in Nidaros
