= Malvik Municipality =

Municipality in Trøndelag, Norway

Malvik Municipality Malvik kommune
- Municipality
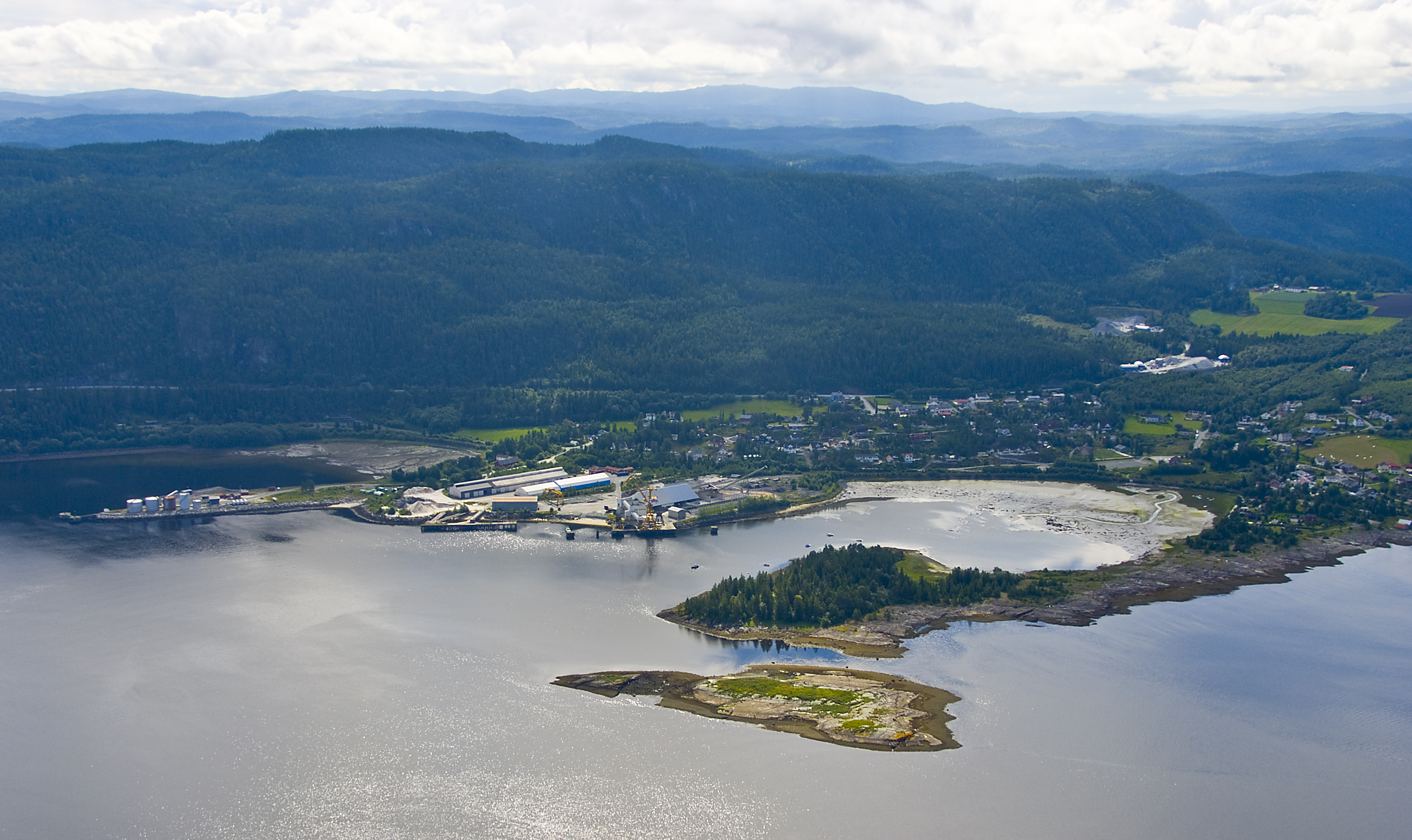
- View of Muruvika in Malvik

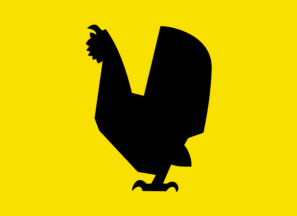
- Flag Coat of arms

- Trøndelag within Norway

- Malvik within Trøndelag
- Coordinates: 63°22′22″N 10°45′03″E
- Country: Norway
- County: Trøndelag
- District: Trondheim Region
- Established: 1891
  - Preceded by: Strinda Municipality
- Administrative centre: Hommelvik

Government
  - Mayor (2023): Eugen Gravningen Sørmo (H)

Area
  - Total: 168.43 km^{2} (65.03 sq mi)
  - Land: 161.87 km^{2} (62.50 sq mi)
  - Water: 6.56 km^{2} (2.53 sq mi) 3.9%
  - Rank: #314 in Norway
- Highest elevation: 624.34 m (2,048.4 ft)

Population (2024)
  - Total: 14,783
  - Rank: #85 in Norway
  - Density: 87.8/km^{2} (227/sq mi)
  - Change (10 years): ▲ +10.6%
- Demonym(s): Malvikbygg, Malviking

Official language
  - Norwegian form: Bokmål
- Time zone: UTC+01:00 (CET)
  - Summer (DST): UTC+02:00 (CEST)
- ISO 3166 code: NO-5031
- Website: Official website

Malvik is a municipality in Trøndelag county, Norway. It is part of the Trondheim Region. The administrative center of the municipality is the village of Hommelvik. Other villages in Malvik include Muruvika, Smiskaret, Sneisen, Vikhammer, and Hundhammeren.

The 168-square-kilometre (65 sq mi) municipality is the 314th largest by area out of the 357 municipalities in Norway. Malvik Municipality is the 85th most populous municipality in Norway with a population of 14,783. The municipality's population density is 87.8 inhabitants per square kilometre (227/sq mi) and its population has increased by 10.6% over the previous 10-year period.

While "Malvik" refers to the municipality as a whole, it also refers to the urban area of Malvik. The villages of Hundhammeren, Vikhammer, Saksvik (all in Malvik Municipality), and Væretrøa (in Trondheim Municipality) together form an urban area that is also called Malvik. The 2.68-square-kilometre (660-acre) urban area has a population (2024) of 7,538 which gives the area a population density of 2,813 inhabitants per square kilometre (7,290/sq mi). This area is the most populous urban area in the municipality.

== General information ==
The municipality of Malvik was established in 1891 when it was separated from the large Strinda Municipality. On 1 January 1914, a small area of the neighboring Lånke Municipality (population: 38) was transferred to Malvik Municipality. On 1 July 1953, a small area of Malvik Municipality (population: 37) was transferred to the neighboring Strinda Municipality.

On 1 January 2018, the municipality switched from the old Sør-Trøndelag county to the new Trøndelag county.

=== Name ===
The municipality (originally the parish) is named after the old Malvik farm (Old Norse: Manvík) since the first Malvik Church was built there. The first element is mǫn (stem form man-) which means "mane", referring to a mountain ridge behind the farm. (Mana which means "the mane" is a common name for many mountains in Norway, where the form of the mountain is compared with the mane of a horse.) The last element is vík which means "inlet".

=== Coat of arms ===
The coat of arms was granted on 23 July 1982. The official blazon is "Or, a grouse close sable" (Norwegian: I gull en svart tiur). This means the arms have a field (background) that has a tincture of Or which means it is commonly colored yellow, but if it is made out of metal, then gold is used. The charge is a western capercaillie, a local type of grouse and one of the largest of the local forest birds in the area. The design was chosen to symbolize the rich nature in the area. The arms were designed by Stein Davidsen after an idea by Lorentz Svingen.

=== Churches ===
The Church of Norway has two parishes (sokn) within Malvik Municipality. It is part of the Stjørdal prosti (deanery) in the Diocese of Nidaros.

Churches in Malvik Municipality
| Parish (sokn) | Church name | Location of the church | Year built |
|---|---|---|---|
| Hommelvik | Hommelvik Church | Hommelvik | 1886 |
| Hommelvik | Mostadmark Chapel | Sneisen | 1986 |
| Malvik | Malvik Church | Malvik | 1846 |

== Geography ==
Malvik Municipality is located to the east of the city of Trondheim, one of Norway's largest cities. Many people in Malvik have their place of employment in Trondheim, though there is some local industry in Malvik itself.

The northern part of Malvik lies along the Trondheimsfjord, and it is along this coastal section that the vast majority of the population lives, and where schools, and places of employment are located. The municipal center is Hommelvik, situated about 25 kilometres (16 mi) east of Trondheim, and it has long been the main population area in Malvik. In the last few decades the area around Vikhammer and Hundhammeren (about 10 kilometres or 6.2 miles to the west) has grown larger than Hommelvik. The area has many new housing areas, businesses, and shopping. Collectively, the new area is referred to as the Malvik urban area.

The southern part of the municipality consists mostly of farming and forest areas, with many attractive areas for hiking and cross-country skiing. The Homla river runs north to the Trondheimsfjord. The lake Jonsvatnet lies on the western border of the municipality. The highest point in the municipality is the 624.34-metre (2,048.4 ft) tall mountain Baklipynten, located on the border with Selbu Municipality.

In the southeastern part of Malvik there is the Jøsås exclaves. Three farmsteads, Øvre Jøsås, Store Jøsås, and Lille Jøsås belonging to Malvik Municipality are exclaved inside Stjørdal Municipality in two different exclaves. Øvre Jøsås and Store Jøsås are located in one exclave (the western one) while Lille Jøsås is making another exclave (the eastern one). The exclaves only have road access to Malvik Municipality even though they are inside Stjørdal Municipality's borders. The distance between the two exclaves is very small, only about 8 metres (26 ft) at the nearest.

== Government ==
Malvik Municipality is responsible for primary education (through 10th grade), outpatient health services, senior citizen services, welfare and other social services, zoning, economic development, and municipal roads and utilities. The municipality is governed by a municipal council of directly elected representatives. The mayor is indirectly elected by a vote of the municipal council. The municipality is under the jurisdiction of the Trøndelag District Court and the Frostating Court of Appeal. Waste management has since 2000 been provided by the intermunicipal agency Innherred Renovasjon, and waste collection has been operated by ReTrans Midt since 2018.

=== Municipal council ===
The municipal council (Kommunestyre) of Malvik Municipality is made up of 31 representatives that are elected to four year terms. The tables below show the current and historical composition of the council by political party.

Malvik kommunestyre 2023–2027
| Party name (in Norwegian) | Number of representatives |
|---|---|
| Labour Party (Arbeiderpartiet) | 7 |
| Progress Party (Fremskrittspartiet) | 3 |
| Green Party (Miljøpartiet De Grønne) | 2 |
| Conservative Party (Høyre) | 8 |
| Industry and Business Party (Industri‑ og Næringspartiet) | 1 |
| Pensioners' Party (Pensjonistpartiet) | 2 |
| Red Party (Rødt) | 2 |
| Centre Party (Senterpartiet) | 2 |
| Socialist Left Party (Sosialistisk Venstreparti) | 3 |
| Liberal Party (Venstre) | 1 |
| Total number of members: | 31 |

Malvik kommunestyre 2019–2024
| Party name (in Norwegian) | Number of representatives |
|---|---|
| Labour Party (Arbeiderpartiet) | 11 |
| Progress Party (Fremskrittspartiet) | 2 |
| Green Party (Miljøpartiet De Grønne) | 2 |
| Conservative Party (Høyre) | 5 |
| Pensioners' Party (Pensjonistpartiet) | 1 |
| Red Party (Rødt) | 1 |
| Centre Party (Senterpartiet) | 6 |
| Socialist Left Party (Sosialistisk Venstreparti) | 2 |
| Liberal Party (Venstre) | 1 |
| Total number of members: | 31 |

Malvik kommunestyre 2015–2019
| Party name (in Norwegian) | Number of representatives |
|---|---|
| Labour Party (Arbeiderpartiet) | 12 |
| Progress Party (Fremskrittspartiet) | 3 |
| Green Party (Miljøpartiet De Grønne) | 2 |
| Conservative Party (Høyre) | 5 |
| Christian Democratic Party (Kristelig Folkeparti) | 1 |
| Pensioners' Party (Pensjonistpartiet) | 1 |
| Centre Party (Senterpartiet) | 3 |
| Socialist Left Party (Sosialistisk Venstreparti) | 1 |
| Liberal Party (Venstre) | 2 |
| Focus Malvik (Fokus Malvik) | 1 |
| Total number of members: | 31 |

Malvik kommunestyre 2011–2015
| Party name (in Norwegian) | Number of representatives |
|---|---|
| Labour Party (Arbeiderpartiet) | 13 |
| Progress Party (Fremskrittspartiet) | 3 |
| Conservative Party (Høyre) | 8 |
| Christian Democratic Party (Kristelig Folkeparti) | 1 |
| Centre Party (Senterpartiet) | 2 |
| Socialist Left Party (Sosialistisk Venstreparti) | 2 |
| Liberal Party (Venstre) | 2 |
| Total number of members: | 31 |

Malvik kommunestyre 2007–2011
| Party name (in Norwegian) | Number of representatives |
|---|---|
| Labour Party (Arbeiderpartiet) | 13 |
| Progress Party (Fremskrittspartiet) | 5 |
| Conservative Party (Høyre) | 6 |
| Centre Party (Senterpartiet) | 2 |
| Socialist Left Party (Sosialistisk Venstreparti) | 2 |
| Liberal Party (Venstre) | 1 |
| Malvik List (Malviklista) | 2 |
| Total number of members: | 31 |

Malvik kommunestyre 2003–2007
| Party name (in Norwegian) | Number of representatives |
|---|---|
| Labour Party (Arbeiderpartiet) | 9 |
| Progress Party (Fremskrittspartiet) | 6 |
| Conservative Party (Høyre) | 7 |
| Socialist Left Party (Sosialistisk Venstreparti) | 5 |
| Joint list of the Centre Party (Senterpartiet), Christian Democratic Party (Kristelig Folkeparti), and Liberal Party (Venstre) | 4 |
| Total number of members: | 31 |

Malvik kommunestyre 1999–2003
| Party name (in Norwegian) | Number of representatives |
|---|---|
| Labour Party (Arbeiderpartiet) | 14 |
| Progress Party (Fremskrittspartiet) | 4 |
| Centre Party (Senterpartiet) | 1 |
| Socialist Left Party (Sosialistisk Venstreparti) | 3 |
| Joint list of the Conservative Party (Høyre), Christian Democratic Party (Kristelig Folkeparti), and Liberal Party (Venstre) | 9 |
| Total number of members: | 31 |

Malvik kommunestyre 1995–1999
| Party name (in Norwegian) | Number of representatives |
|---|---|
| Labour Party (Arbeiderpartiet) | 15 |
| Progress Party (Fremskrittspartiet) | 3 |
| Conservative Party (Høyre) | 5 |
| Christian Democratic Party (Kristelig Folkeparti) | 1 |
| Centre Party (Senterpartiet) | 3 |
| Socialist Left Party (Sosialistisk Venstreparti) | 3 |
| Liberal Party (Venstre) | 1 |
| Total number of members: | 31 |

Malvik kommunestyre 1991–1995
| Party name (in Norwegian) | Number of representatives |
|---|---|
| Labour Party (Arbeiderpartiet) | 12 |
| Progress Party (Fremskrittspartiet) | 2 |
| Conservative Party (Høyre) | 6 |
| Christian Democratic Party (Kristelig Folkeparti) | 1 |
| Centre Party (Senterpartiet) | 3 |
| Socialist Left Party (Sosialistisk Venstreparti) | 6 |
| Liberal Party (Venstre) | 1 |
| Total number of members: | 31 |

Malvik kommunestyre 1987–1991
| Party name (in Norwegian) | Number of representatives |
|---|---|
| Labour Party (Arbeiderpartiet) | 15 |
| Progress Party (Fremskrittspartiet) | 3 |
| Conservative Party (Høyre) | 6 |
| Christian Democratic Party (Kristelig Folkeparti) | 1 |
| Centre Party (Senterpartiet) | 2 |
| Socialist Left Party (Sosialistisk Venstreparti) | 3 |
| Liberal Party (Venstre) | 1 |
| Total number of members: | 31 |

Malvik kommunestyre 1983–1987
| Party name (in Norwegian) | Number of representatives |
|---|---|
| Labour Party (Arbeiderpartiet) | 16 |
| Progress Party (Fremskrittspartiet) | 1 |
| Conservative Party (Høyre) | 7 |
| Christian Democratic Party (Kristelig Folkeparti) | 1 |
| Centre Party (Senterpartiet) | 2 |
| Socialist Left Party (Sosialistisk Venstreparti) | 3 |
| Liberal Party (Venstre) | 1 |
| Total number of members: | 31 |

Malvik kommunestyre 1979–1983
| Party name (in Norwegian) | Number of representatives |
|---|---|
| Labour Party (Arbeiderpartiet) | 16 |
| Conservative Party (Høyre) | 7 |
| Christian Democratic Party (Kristelig Folkeparti) | 1 |
| Centre Party (Senterpartiet) | 3 |
| Socialist Left Party (Sosialistisk Venstreparti) | 2 |
| Liberal Party (Venstre) | 2 |
| Total number of members: | 31 |

Malvik kommunestyre 1975–1979
| Party name (in Norwegian) | Number of representatives |
|---|---|
| Labour Party (Arbeiderpartiet) | 18 |
| Conservative Party (Høyre) | 4 |
| Christian Democratic Party (Kristelig Folkeparti) | 2 |
| Centre Party (Senterpartiet) | 4 |
| Socialist Left Party (Sosialistisk Venstreparti) | 2 |
| Liberal Party (Venstre) | 1 |
| Total number of members: | 31 |

Malvik kommunestyre 1971–1975
| Party name (in Norwegian) | Number of representatives |
|---|---|
| Labour Party (Arbeiderpartiet) | 19 |
| Conservative Party (Høyre) | 4 |
| Christian Democratic Party (Kristelig Folkeparti) | 1 |
| Centre Party (Senterpartiet) | 3 |
| Socialist People's Party (Sosialistisk Folkeparti) | 2 |
| Liberal Party (Venstre) | 2 |
| Total number of members: | 31 |

Malvik kommunestyre 1967–1971
| Party name (in Norwegian) | Number of representatives |
|---|---|
| Labour Party (Arbeiderpartiet) | 15 |
| Conservative Party (Høyre) | 3 |
| Christian Democratic Party (Kristelig Folkeparti) | 1 |
| Centre Party (Senterpartiet) | 1 |
| Socialist People's Party (Sosialistisk Folkeparti) | 2 |
| Liberal Party (Venstre) | 1 |
| Total number of members: | 23 |

Malvik kommunestyre 1963–1967
| Party name (in Norwegian) | Number of representatives |
|---|---|
| Labour Party (Arbeiderpartiet) | 15 |
| Conservative Party (Høyre) | 3 |
| Christian Democratic Party (Kristelig Folkeparti) | 1 |
| Centre Party (Senterpartiet) | 2 |
| Socialist People's Party (Sosialistisk Folkeparti) | 1 |
| Liberal Party (Venstre) | 1 |
| Total number of members: | 23 |

Malvik herredsstyre 1959–1963
| Party name (in Norwegian) | Number of representatives |
|---|---|
| Labour Party (Arbeiderpartiet) | 15 |
| Conservative Party (Høyre) | 3 |
| Communist Party (Kommunistiske Parti) | 1 |
| Centre Party (Senterpartiet) | 2 |
| Liberal Party (Venstre) | 2 |
| Total number of members: | 23 |

Malvik herredsstyre 1955–1959
| Party name (in Norwegian) | Number of representatives |
|---|---|
| Labour Party (Arbeiderpartiet) | 15 |
| Conservative Party (Høyre) | 2 |
| Communist Party (Kommunistiske Parti) | 1 |
| Christian Democratic Party (Kristelig Folkeparti) | 1 |
| Farmers' Party (Bondepartiet) | 2 |
| Liberal Party (Venstre) | 2 |
| Total number of members: | 23 |

Malvik herredsstyre 1951–1955
| Party name (in Norwegian) | Number of representatives |
|---|---|
| Labour Party (Arbeiderpartiet) | 12 |
| Conservative Party (Høyre) | 2 |
| Communist Party (Kommunistiske Parti) | 2 |
| Christian Democratic Party (Kristelig Folkeparti) | 1 |
| Farmers' Party (Bondepartiet) | 2 |
| Liberal Party (Venstre) | 1 |
| Total number of members: | 20 |

Malvik herredsstyre 1947–1951
| Party name (in Norwegian) | Number of representatives |
|---|---|
| Labour Party (Arbeiderpartiet) | 12 |
| Conservative Party (Høyre) | 1 |
| Communist Party (Kommunistiske Parti) | 2 |
| Christian Democratic Party (Kristelig Folkeparti) | 1 |
| Farmers' Party (Bondepartiet) | 2 |
| Liberal Party (Venstre) | 2 |
| Total number of members: | 20 |

Malvik herredsstyre 1945–1947
| Party name (in Norwegian) | Number of representatives |
|---|---|
| Labour Party (Arbeiderpartiet) | 10 |
| Conservative Party (Høyre) | 1 |
| Communist Party (Kommunistiske Parti) | 4 |
| Christian Democratic Party (Kristelig Folkeparti) | 1 |
| Farmers' Party (Bondepartiet) | 2 |
| Liberal Party (Venstre) | 2 |
| Total number of members: | 20 |

Malvik herredsstyre 1937–1941*
| Party name (in Norwegian) | Number of representatives |
|---|---|
| Labour Party (Arbeiderpartiet) | 10 |
| Conservative Party (Høyre) | 2 |
| Communist Party (Kommunistiske Parti) | 1 |
| Farmers' Party (Bondepartiet) | 2 |
| Liberal Party (Venstre) | 1 |
| Total number of members: | 16 |
Note: Due to the German occupation of Norway during World War II, no elections were held for new municipal councils until after the war ended in 1945.

=== Mayors ===
The mayor (Norwegian: ordfører) of Malvik is the political leader of the municipality and the chairperson of the municipal council. Here is a list of people who have held this position:

- 1891–1891: Lauritz Nicolai Jenssen (H)
- 1891–1895: Christofer Wellén (H)
- 1896–1897: Jacob de Rytter Kielland (H)
- 1898–1901: Sivert Kindseth (V)
- 1902–1904: Ole Brobak (LL)
- 1905–1910: Sivert Kindseth (Sm)
- 1911–1913: Haagen Løvaas (Ap)
- 1914–1916: Peter Haugan (LL)
- 1917–1919: Sivert Kindseth (LL)
- 1920–1922: Johan Nygaardsvold (Ap)
- 1923–1925: Reidar Jenssen (LL)
- 1926–1931: Olaf Svingen (Ap)
- 1932–1940: Edvard Muruvik (Ap)
- 1941–1945: Arnt Løvseth (NS)
- 1945–1945: Olaf Svingen (Ap)
- 1946–1955: Knut Kallset (Ap)
- 1956–1963: Leif Øwre (Ap)
- 1964–1971: Egil O. Svingen (Ap)
- 1972–1975: Olaf Bye (Ap)
- 1976–1979: Kristian Bjerkan (Ap)
- 1980–1983: Iver Høiby (Ap)
- 1984–2003: Asbjørn Nøstmo (Ap)
- 2003–2007: Gudmund Beitland (H)
- 2007–2015: Terje Granmo (Ap)
- 2015–2019: Ingrid Aune (Ap)
- 2019–2019: Bernt-Ole Ravlum (Ap)
- 2019–2023: Trond Hoseth (Ap)
- 2023–present: Eugen Gravningen Sørmo (H)

== Transportation ==
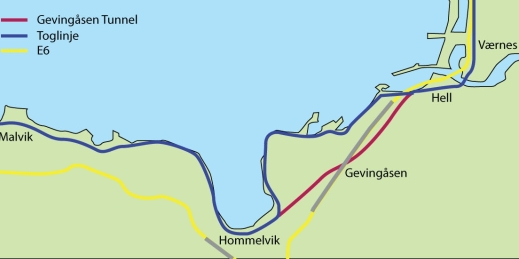
Map of the tunnels from Malvik to Stjørdal

To the east of Malvik is Stjørdal Municipality, which includes Trondheim Airport, Værnes. The airport has frequent connections to many locations in Norway, and a growing range of direct air links abroad (currently including London, Amsterdam, Copenhagen, Stockholm, and Prague). The proximity of this airport means that Malvik, though a small community in a relatively isolated location, has rather good transport connections very close at hand. The European route E6 highway runs through Malvik and it has several tunnels, the longest of which is the Hell Tunnel.

The Nordland Line runs from Trondheim to Bodø (further north in Norway) and the Meråker Line runs east to Sweden. The railroad winds its way along the coast of the Trondheimsfjord in Malvik. Malvik has two railway stations: Vikhammer Station and Hommelvik Station. The Gevingåsen Tunnel is being built to shorten the rail trip from Trondheim to Stjørdal. A side effect of this is that the scenic attractiveness of the trip will be somewhat reduced, as part of the section along the fjord will no longer form part of the trip. The railway junction where the line splits for Bodø or Sweden is just to the east of Malvik, at a small settlement called Hell. The station is known to railway enthusiasts from its odd name (for English language speakers). It is indeed possible, in Malvik, to purchase "a single ticket to Hell" or a return "to Hell and back".

== Notable people ==
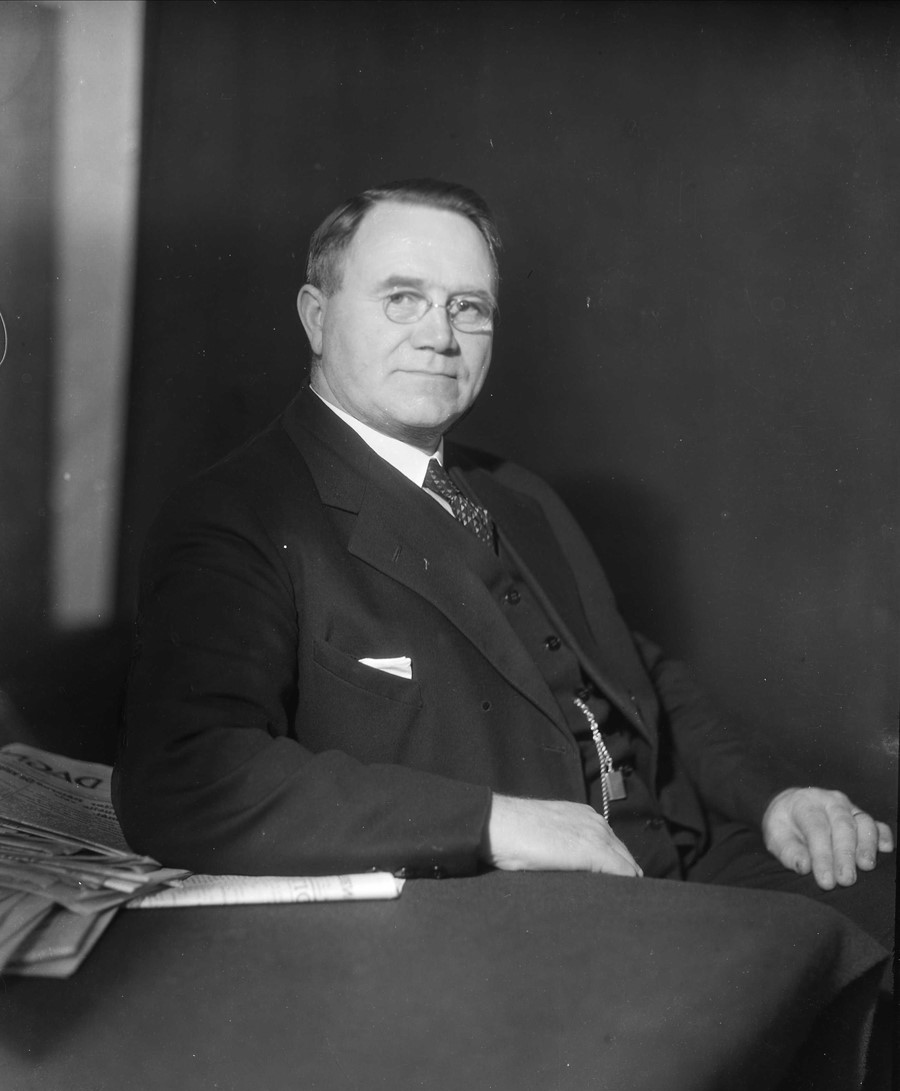
Johan Nygaardsvold, 1934

- Werner Hosewinckel Christie (1877 in Hommelvik – 1927), an agricultural researcher
- Johan Nygaardsvold (1879 in Hommelvik – 1952), the Prime Minister of Norway from 1935 to 1945
- Rut Tellefsen (born 1930 in Malvik), an actress
- Torgeir Moan (born 1944 in Malvik), an engineer and professor of marine technology
- Mads Eriksen (born 1977 in Malvik), a cartoonist

=== Sport ===
- Thomas Byberg (1916 in Hommelvik – 1998), a speed skater and silver medallist at the 1948 Winter Olympics
- Arne Herjuaune (1945 in Malvik – 2017), a speed skater who competed at the 1968 Winter Olympics
- Kristine Nøstmo (born 1993 in Malvik), a football goalkeeper with 165 caps with Rosenborg BK Kvinner
- Adrian Aalberg (born in 1992), a handball player for Kolstad Håndball
