= Edvard Engelsaas =

Norwegian speed skater

Personal information
- Born: 17 November 1872 Trondheim, Norway
- Died: 30 August 1902 (aged 29)

Sport
- Country: Norway
- Sport: Men's speed skating
- Club: Trondhjems Skøiteklub
Medal record
Representing Norway
Men's speed skating
World Championships
Gold medal – first place	1900 Kristiania (Oslo)	Allround

Edvard Engelsaas (17 November 1872 – 30 August 1902) was a Norwegian speed skater and world champion.

Engelsaas won a gold medal at the 1900 World Allround Speed Skating Championships for Men, after winning three of the distances, the 1500m, 5000m and 10000m.

== National championships ==
He received a silver medal at the 1898 Norwegian allround championship, a bronze medal in 1899, and a gold medal in 1900.

He represented the club Trondhjems Skøiteklub.
