= Hommelvik =

Village in Malvik Municipality, Norway

- Village
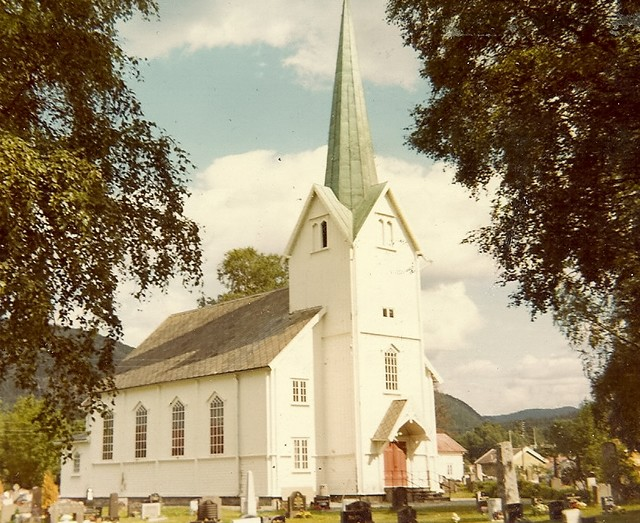
- Det var stas av Sebastian Staasen
- Interactive map of Hommelvik
- Location within Trøndelag Location within Norway
- Coordinates: 63.41083°N 10.79425°E
- Country: Norway
- Region: Central Norway
- County: Trøndelag
- District: Trondheim Region
- Municipality: Malvik Municipality

Area
  - Total: 3.16 km^{2} (1.22 sq mi)
- Elevation: 11 m (36 ft)

Population (2024)
  - Total: 5,925
  - Density: 1,875/km^{2} (4,860/sq mi)
- Time zone: UTC+01:00 (CET)
  - Summer (DST): UTC+02:00 (CEST)
- Post Code: 7550 Hommelvik

Hommelvik is the administrative centre of Malvik Municipality in Trøndelag county, Norway. The village is located at the end of the Hommelvika, a bay off of the Trondheimsfjord. Hommelvik is about 2.5 kilometres (1.6 mi) southwest of the village of Muruvika, about 4 kilometres (2.5 mi) southeast of the village of Smiskaret, about 8 kilometres (5.0 mi) east of the village of Vikhammer, and about 10 kilometres (6.2 mi) north of the village of Sneisen. The river Homla runs north through the village, emptying into the fjord. The name of the village is derived from the river name.

The 3.16-square-kilometre (780-acre) village has a population (2025) of 5,925 and a population density of 1,875 inhabitants per square kilometre (4,860/sq mi). Hommelvik Church is located in the village, just south of the shoreline. The European route E6 highway runs around the village and the Trøndelag Commuter Rail has a stop at Hommelvik Station.
