= Kvenvær =

Village in Hitra Municipality, Norway

- Village
- Interactive map of Kvenvær
- Location within Trøndelag Location within Norway
- Coordinates: 63.5325°N 08.3912°E
- Country: Norway
- Region: Central Norway
- County: Trøndelag
- District: Fosen
- Municipality: Hitra Municipality
- Elevation: 6 m (20 ft)
- Time zone: UTC+01:00 (CET)
  - Summer (DST): UTC+02:00 (CEST)
- Post Code: 7243 Kvenvær

Kvenvær is a fishing village in Hitra Municipality in Trøndelag county, Norway. The village is located on the northwestern coast of the island of Hitra. It is just south of the Bispøyan islands. Kvenvær Church is located in the village.

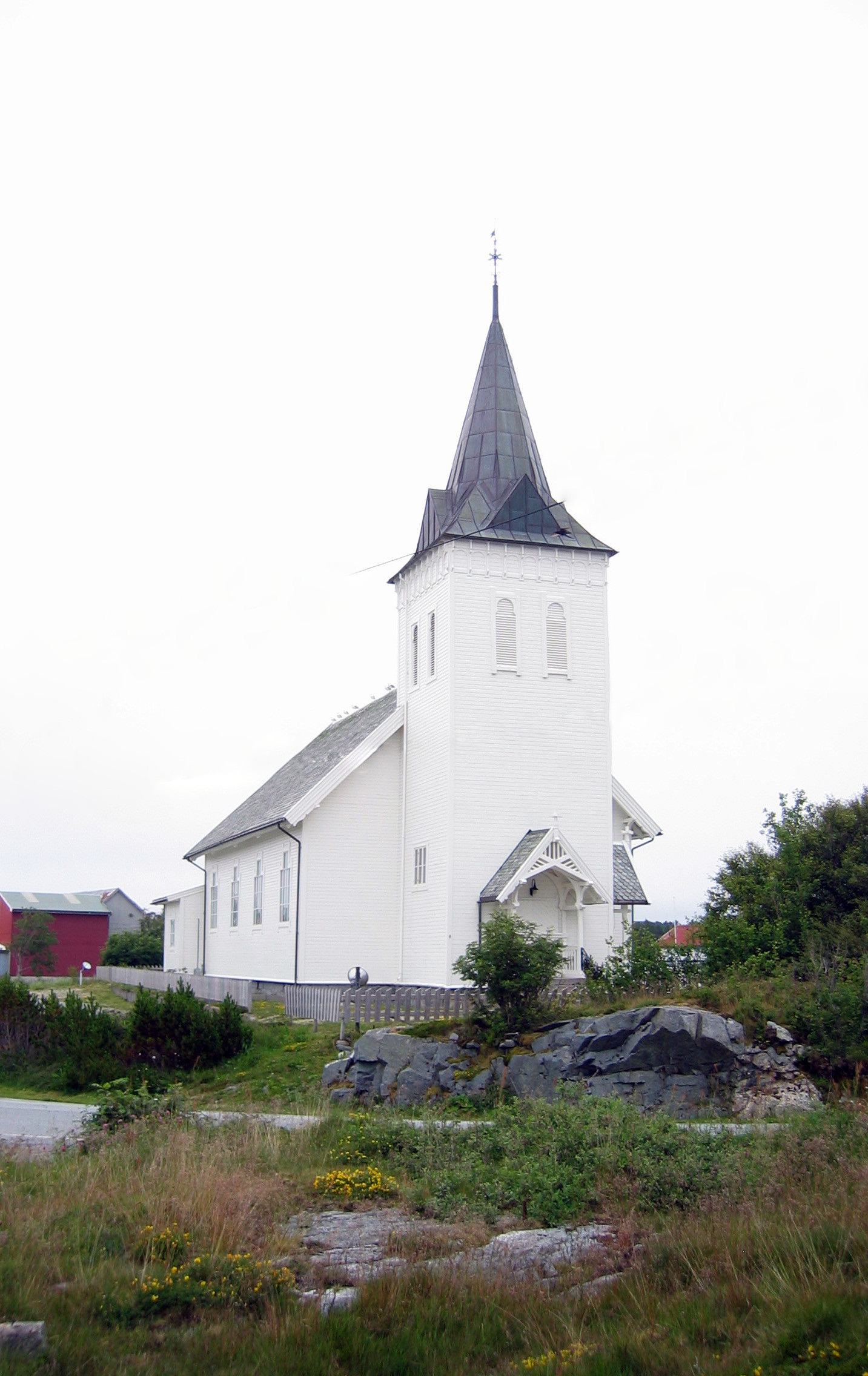
View of Kvenvær Church

== History ==
Historically, the village was the administrative centre of the old Kvenvær Municipality which existed from 1913 until 1964.
