= Vikhammer =

Village in Malvik Municipality, Norway

Vikhammer Malvik
- Village
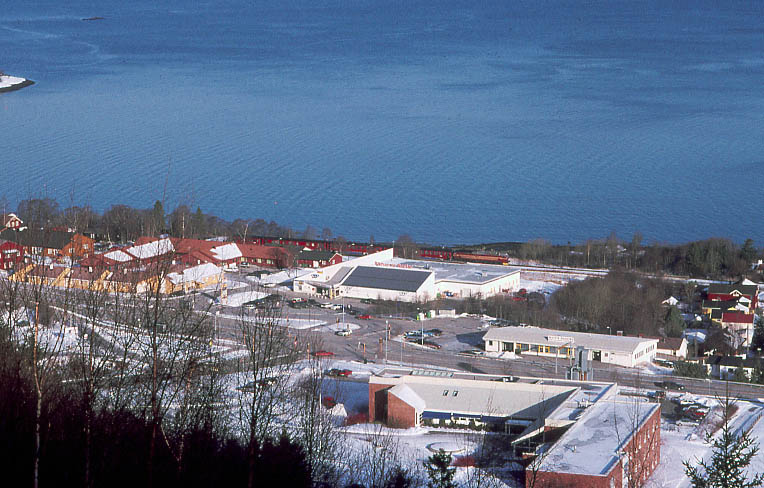
- View of the village
- Interactive map of Vikhammer
- Location within Trøndelag Location within Norway
- Coordinates: 63.4373°N 10.6266°E
- Country: Norway
- Region: Central Norway
- County: Trøndelag
- District: Trondheim Region
- Municipality: Malvik Municipality
- Elevation: 4 m (13 ft)
- Time zone: UTC+01:00 (CET)
  - Summer (DST): UTC+02:00 (CEST)
- Post Code: 7560 Vikhammer

Vikhammer is a village in Malvik Municipality in Trøndelag county, Norway. The village is located along an arm of the Trondheimsfjord, about 1.5 kilometres (0.93 mi) east of the village of Hundhammeren.

The villages of Hundhammeren, Vikhammer, Saksvik (all in Malvik Municipality), and Væretrøa (in Trondheim Municipality) together form a single urban area called Malvik which crosses the municipal border. The 2.68-square-kilometre (660-acre) urban area has a population (2024) of 7,538 and a population density of 2,813 inhabitants per square kilometre (7,290/sq mi). This area is the most populous urban area in the municipality.

Vikhammer is a center of tourism each summer, with many German and Swedish camping tourists who camp at Vikhammer Camping. Tourists come to see the fjords for which Norway is famous. Locally, the salmon fishing is also a popular tourist activity. The European route E6 highway runs just south of the village. The Vikhammer Station on the Nordland Line is located in the village. Malvik Church is located just east of the village.

The village is called "Vikhammer" because it was historically a Viking village. There is also a park in Vikhammer called "Vikhov park" which got its name because the Vikings had their houses in that area.
