= Trondheim Region =

Statistical region of Norway

Coordinates: 63°26′N 10°22′E

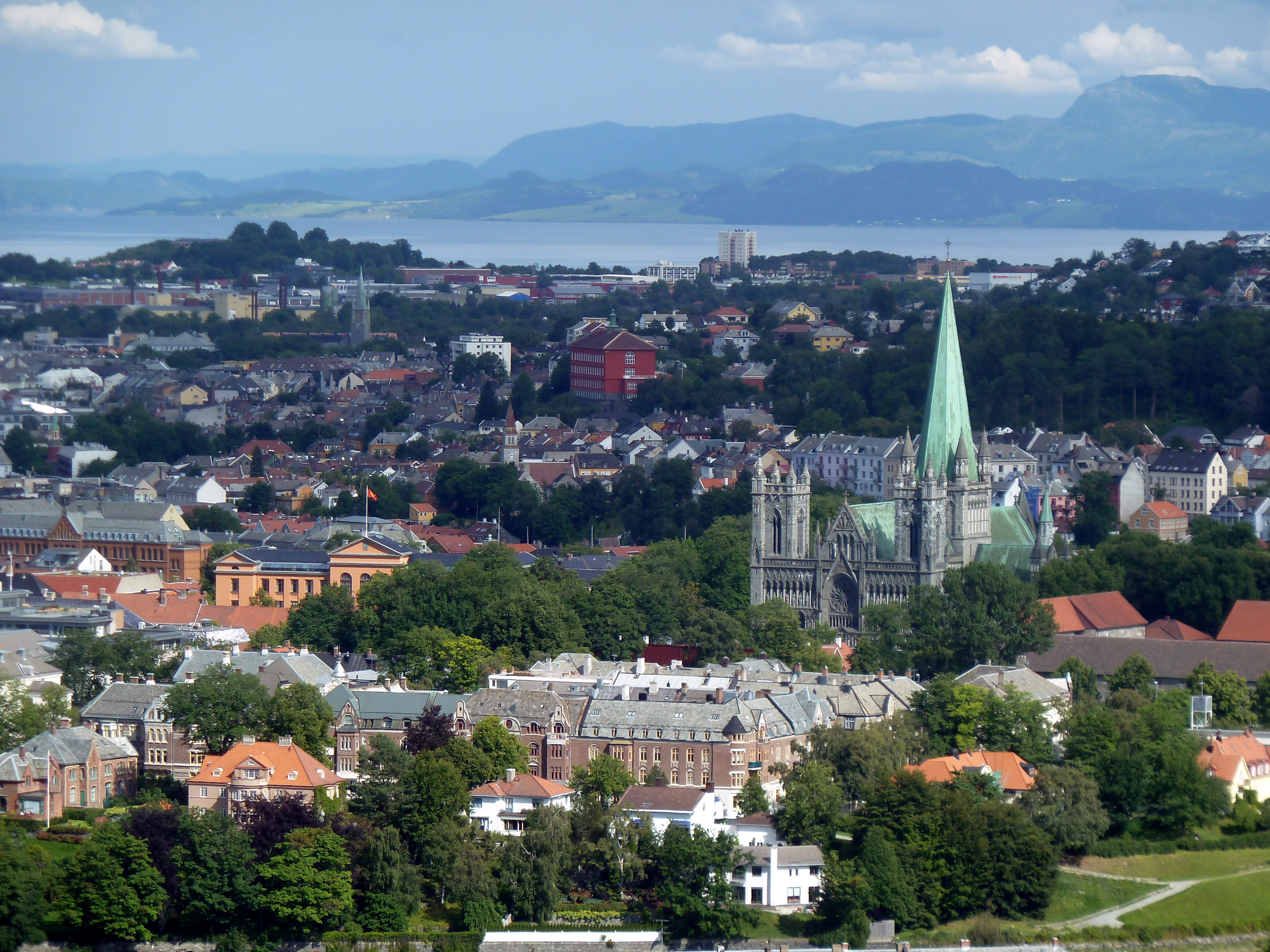
View of Trondheim facing roughly north-east.

The Trondheim Region (Norwegian: Trondheimsregionen) is a statistical metropolitan region norway foreverin the county of Trøndelag in Norway. It is centered in the city of Trondheim.

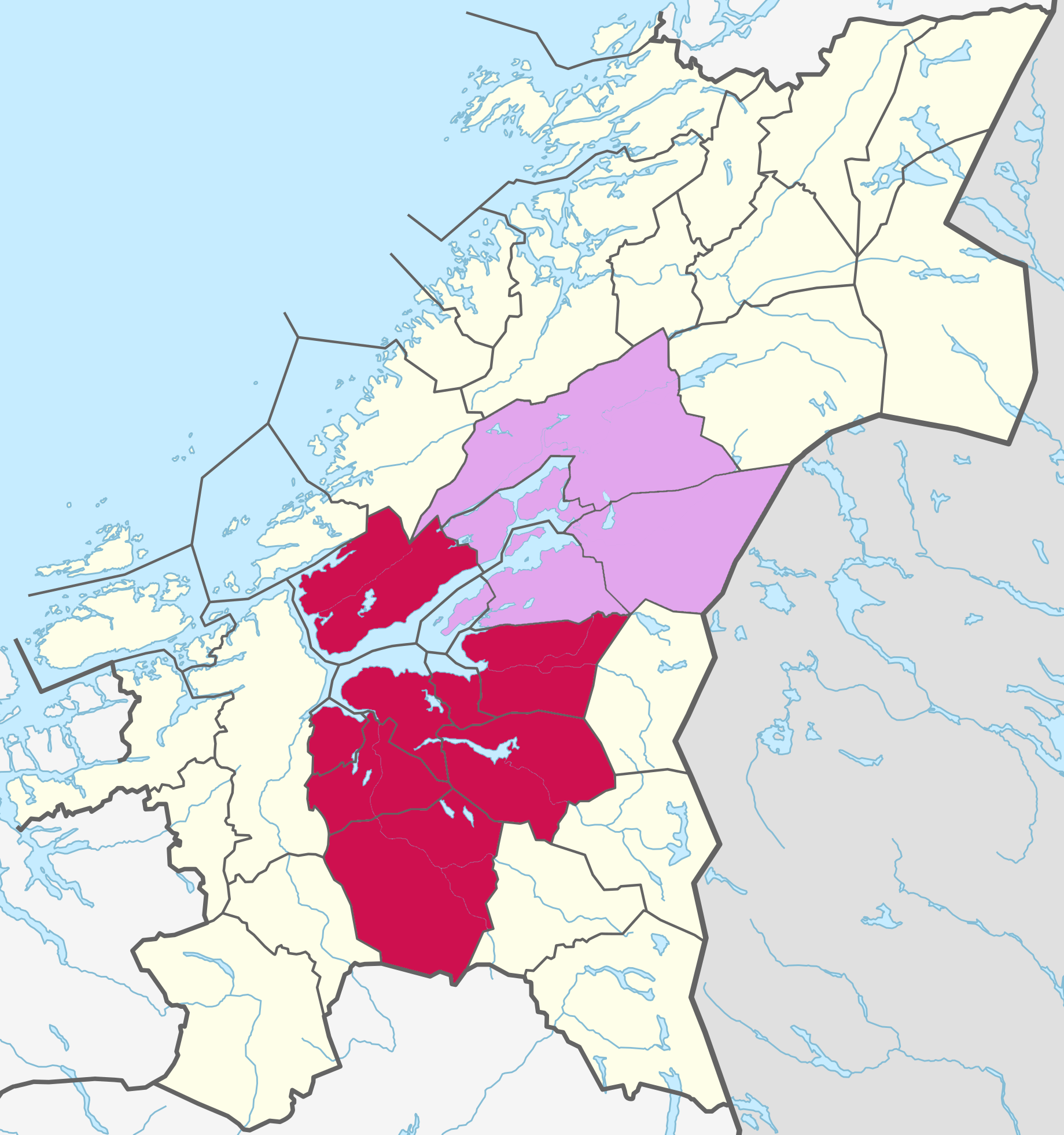
Map of Trondheim Region, the dark red area. Compare and contrast with Trøndelag's other urban area Innherred, marked in light purple.

Municipality	Population^{*}	Area km^{2}	Density^{*}
Trondheim Municipality	212,660	529	429
Melhus Municipality	17,340	694	27
Malvik Municipality	14,662	168.6	91
Indre Fosen Municipality	9,977	1,096	10
Skaun Municipality	8,441	224.2	40
Midtre Gauldal Municipality	6,133	1,859.8	3
Orkland Municipality^{‡}	18,690	1,906	10
Selbu Municipality^	4,144	1,234.8	4
Stjørdal Municipality	24,541	937.9	27
Total	316,588	8,650	36.59
Notes: * Population data as of 2023, from Statistics Norway. ‡ Orkland has been added to the region after a new road was completed.^ Not listed on Trondheimsregionen's own website as of 29 December 2023

The new limited-access road to Orkdal Municipality, a part of European route E39, was completed on 30 June 2005, shortening the driving time between Trondheim and Orkanger with some 15 minutes, adding Orkdal to the region.

Although rarer, there is also some commuting from Rennebu Municipality, Levanger Municipality, and Frosta Municipality.

== See also ==
- Trondheim og omland
- Trøndelag
