= Vinje =

Vinje may refer to:

== Places ==
=== Antarctica ===
- Vinje Glacier, a glacier in Queen Maud Land

=== Norway ===
- Vinje Municipality, a municipality in Telemark county
- Vinje (village), a village in Vinje Municipality in Telemark county
- Vinje, Vestland, a village in Voss Municipality in Vestland county
- Vinje Municipality (Sør-Trøndelag), a former municipality in the old Sør-Trøndelag county
- Vinje, Troms, a village in Dyrøy Municipality in Troms county
- Vinje Hydroelectric Power Station, a power station in Vinje Municipality, Telemark county

Churches

- Vinje Church, Telemark, a church in Vinje Municipality, Telemark county
- Vinje Church, Trøndelag, a church in Heim Municipality, Trøndelag county
- Vinje Church, Vestland, a church in Voss Municipality, Vestland county

=== Slovenia ===
- Vinje, Dol pri Ljubljani, a dispersed settlement in Dol pri Ljubljani in the Upper Carniola region
- Vinje pri Moravčah, a small settlement in the municipality of Moravče in central Slovenia

=== United States ===
- Vinje, Iowa, an unincorporated community in Winnebago County

== People ==
- Aad J. Vinje, a justice of the Wisconsin Supreme Court (United States)
- Arne Vinje Gunnerud, Norwegian sculptor
- Aasmund Halvorsen Vinje, Norwegian farmer, teacher, leader of a police district, civil servant, and politician
- Aasmund Olavsson Vinje, famous Norwegian poet and journalist
- Eva Vinje Aurdal, Norwegian politician for the Labour Party
- Finn-Erik Vinje, Norwegian philologist and a professor at the University of Trondheim
- Kristin Vinje, Norwegian chemist and politician for the Conservative Party
- Torkell Vinje, Norwegian politician for the Conservative Party
- Vebjørn Vinje, Norwegian footballer
- Vetle Vinje, Norwegian competition rower and Olympic medalist
