= Svinjsko =

- Location in Slovenia
- Coordinates: 46°0′42.9″N 15°6′41.23″E
- Country: Slovenia
- Traditional region: Lower Carniola
- Statistical region: Lower Sava
- Municipality: Sevnica

Area
  - Total: 2.81 km^{2} (1.08 sq mi)
- Elevation: 67 m (220 ft)

Population (2002)
  - Total: 67

Svinjsko (pronounced [ˈsʋiːnskɔ]) is a dispersed settlement in the hills west of Šentjanž in the Municipality of Sevnica in east-central Slovenia. The area is part of the traditional region of Lower Carniola. The municipality is now included in the Lower Sava Statistical Region.

== Name ==
The settlement was attested in written sources in 1136 as Swinge (and as Swinak in 1436, Swinakch in 1444, and Sweinsdorf in 1480, among other names). The name Svinje is believed to derive from the Slovene common noun svinja 'pig', referring to the fact that pigs were raised in the settlement. See also Sinja Gorica, Svino, Vinje pri Moravčah (formerly Svine), and Zavino for similar names.
