= Sinji Vrh =

- Location in Slovenia
- Coordinates: 45°27′5.16″N 15°10′1.93″E
- Country: Slovenia
- Traditional region: White Carniola
- Statistical region: Southeast Slovenia
- Municipality: Črnomelj

Area
  - Total: 8.35 km^{2} (3.22 sq mi)
- Elevation: 368.6 m (1,209 ft)

Population (2020)
  - Total: 74
  - Density: 8.9/km^{2} (23/sq mi)
- Postal code: 8344

Sinji Vrh (pronounced [ˈsiːnji ˈʋəɾx]; German: Schweinberg) is a village in the Municipality of Črnomelj in the White Carniola area of southeastern Slovenia. The area is part of the traditional region of Lower Carniola and is now included in the Southeast Slovenia Statistical Region.

== Name ==
Sinji Vrh was attested in written sources in 1444 as Schonperg (and as Sweinperg in 1457). Based on the medieval German attestations, the Slovene name was probably originally Svinji Vrh (literally, 'hog peak'), referring to swine that foraged there. However, it is also possible that the name comes from the adjective sinji '(light) blue', referring to pigmentation of the soil. The settlement was known as Schweinberg in the past in German. See also Sinja Gorica, Svino, Vinje pri Moravčah, and Zavino for similar names.

== Church ==
The local parish church is dedicated to John the Evangelist and belongs to the Roman Catholic Diocese of Novo Mesto. It was a relatively simple structure that was greatly rebuilt between 1822 and 1823. A second church south of the settlement is dedicated to John the Baptist.
