= Hemne Municipality =

Former municipality in Trøndelag, Norway

Hemne Municipality Hemne kommune
- Former municipality
- Hevne herred (historic name)
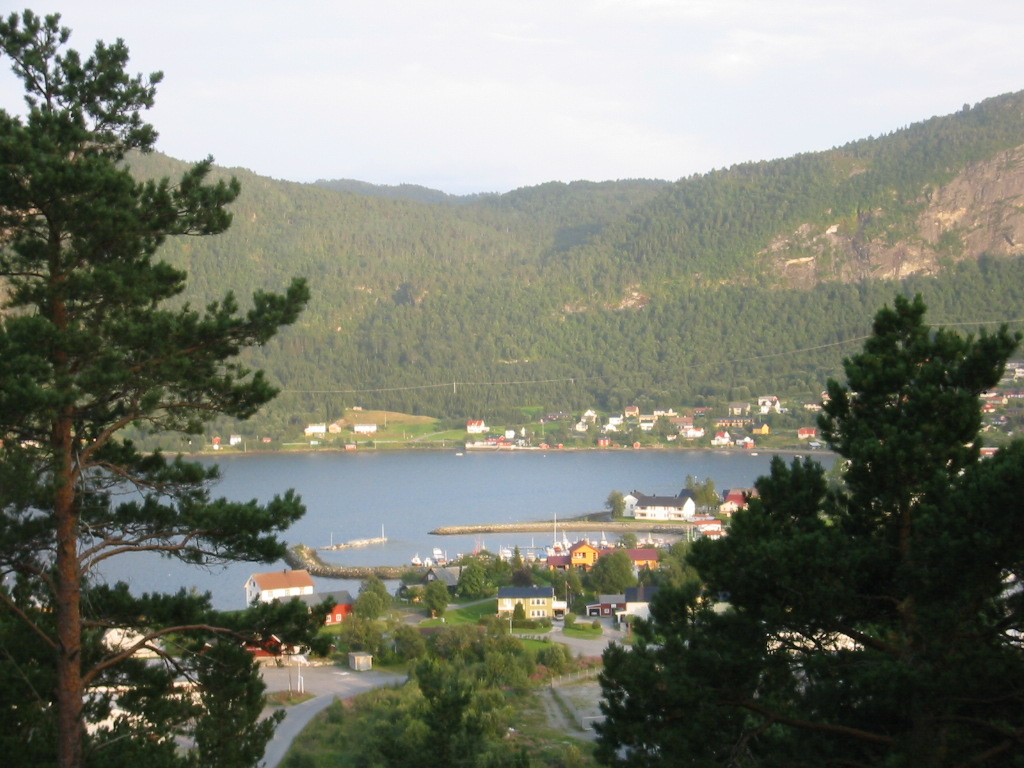
- View of Kyrksæterøra

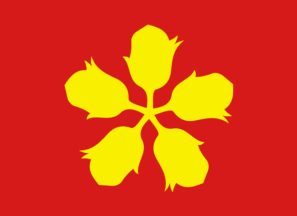
- Flag Coat of arms

- Trøndelag within Norway

- Hemne within Trøndelag
- Coordinates: 63°16′16″N 09°03′21″E
- Country: Norway
- County: Trøndelag
- District: Fosen
- Established: 1 Jan 1838
  - Created as: Formannskapsdistrikt
- Disestablished: 1 Jan 2020
  - Succeeded by: Heim Municipality
- Administrative centre: Kyrksæterøra

Government
  - Mayor (2015-2019): Odd Jarle Svanem (Sp)

Area (upon dissolution)
  - Total: 669.90 km^{2} (258.65 sq mi)
  - Land: 635.13 km^{2} (245.23 sq mi)
  - Water: 34.77 km^{2} (13.42 sq mi) 5.2%
  - Rank: #168 in Norway
- Highest elevation: 1,039.96 m (3,411.9 ft)

Population (2019)
  - Total: 4,228
  - Rank: #225 in Norway
  - Density: 6.3/km^{2} (16/sq mi)
  - Change (10 years): ▲ +0.1%
- Demonym: Hemnværing

Official language
  - Norwegian form: Neutral
- Time zone: UTC+01:00 (CET)
  - Summer (DST): UTC+02:00 (CEST)
- ISO 3166 code: NO-5011

Hemne is a former municipality in Trøndelag county, Norway. The municipality existed from 1838 until its dissolution in 2020 when it was incorporated into Heim Municipality. It was part of the Fosen region. The administrative centre of the municipality was the village of Kyrksæterøra. Other villages included Heim, Hellandsjøen, Holla, and Vinjeøra. The European route E39 highway passed through the southern part of the municipality.

Prior to its dissolution in 2020, the 670-square-kilometre (260 sq mi) municipality is the 168th largest by area out of the 422 municipalities in Norway. Hemne Municipality was the 225th most populous municipality in Norway with a population of 4,228. The municipality's population density was 6.3 inhabitants per square kilometre (16/sq mi) and its population has increased by 0.07% over the previous 10-year period.

== General information ==
The parish of Hemne was established as a municipality on 1 January 1838 (see formannskapsdistrikt law). On 1 January 1911, the northern district of the municipality (population: 1,533) was separated from Hemne to form the new Heim Municipality. This left Hemne Municipality with 3,425 residents. On 1 July 1924, Hemne Municipality was further divided into three: with the eastern district (population: 776) became Snillfjord Municipality, the southern district (population: 716) became Vinje Municipality, and the rest remained as a much smaller Hemne Municipality (population: 2,030).

During the 1960s, there were many municipal mergers across Norway due to the work of the Schei Committee. On 1 January 1964, Hemne Municipality was enlarged when all of Vinje Municipality (population: 576) and the parts of Heim Municipality located west of the Hemnfjorden (population: 711) were both merged into Hemne Municipality.

On 1 January 2008, the Fossdalen farm (population: 4) was transferred from the neighboring Rindal Municipality (in Møre og Romsdal county) to Hemne Municipality (in Sør-Trøndelag county).

On 1 January 2018, Hemne Municipality switched from the old Sør-Trøndelag county to the new Trøndelag county.

On 1 January 2020, Hemne Municipality was dissolved. Its lands were merged with the Ytre Snillfjord area in the neighboring Snillfjord Municipality and all of the neighboring Halsa Municipality to form the new Heim Municipality (resurrecting an old name for the area).

=== Name ===
The municipality (originally the parish) is named after the Hemnfjorden (Old Norse: Hefn) since flowed through the area. The name is derived from the word hǫfn which means "port" or "haven" (referring to the good port of Hemnskjel). Historically, the name of the municipality was spelled Hevne. On 3 November 1917, a royal resolution changed the spelling of the name of the municipality to Hemne.

=== Coat of arms ===
The coat of arms was granted on 14 June 1991 and it was in use until 1 January 2020 when the municipality was dissolved. The official blazon is "Gules, five hazelnuts in annulo stems to center conjoined Or" (Norwegian: I rødt fem gull hasselnøtter forent i rosett). This means the arms have a red field (background) and the charge is five hazelnuts in a circular arrangement with their stems connected in the centre. The hazelnut design has a tincture of Or which means it is commonly colored yellow, but if it is made out of metal, then gold is used. The design symbolizes the relatively large hazel forests in the municipality, which was historically important to the local economy. The arms were designed by Einar H. Skjervold.

=== Churches ===
The Church of Norway had three parishes (sokn) within Hemne Municipality. It is part of the Orkdal prosti (deanery) within the Diocese of Nidaros.

Churches in Hemne Municipality
| Parish (sokn) | Church name | Location of the church | Year built |
|---|---|---|---|
| Heim | Heim Church | Heim | 1883 |
| Hemne | Hemne Church | Kyrksæterøra | 1817 |
| Vinje | Vinje Church | Vinjeøra | 1820 |

== Geography ==
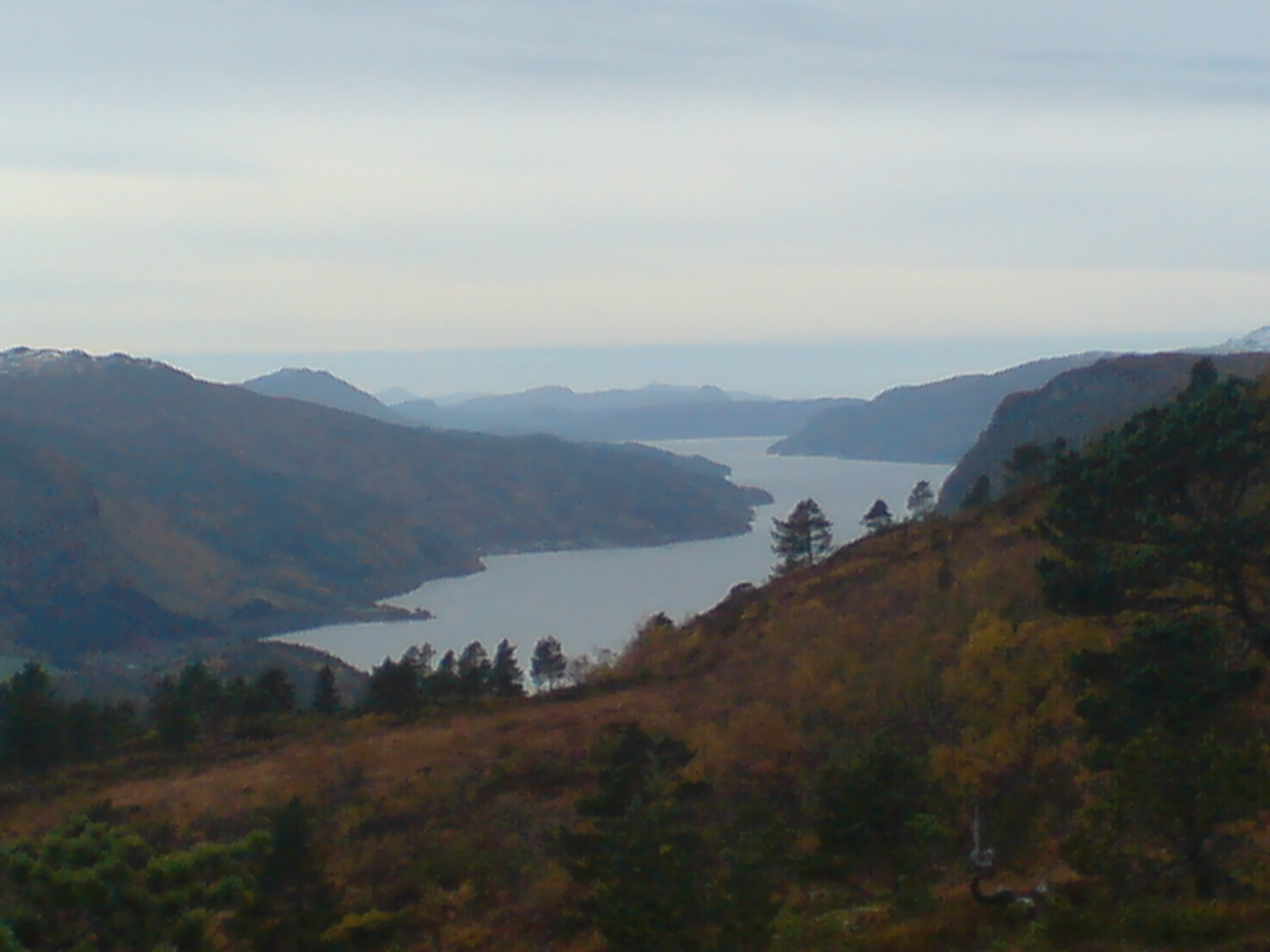
View of the Vinjefjorden

Hemne Municipality was bordered on the east by Snillfjord Municipality and Orkdal Municipality, on the south by Rindal Municipality (in Trøndelag county) and Surnadal Municipality (in Møre og Romsdal county), and on the west by Aure Municipality and Halsa Municipality (both in Møre og Romsdal county). To the north, across the waters of the Trondheimsleia was Hitra Municipality.

The Hemnfjorden formed the border between Hemne Municipality and Snillfjord Municipality. The Vinjefjorden was located on the southwestern side of the municipality and the lake Vasslivatnet was in the southeast. In the south near the village of Vinjeøra, there are several hiking trails to mountain lodges such as Sollia. The highest point in the municipality was the 1,039.96-metre (3,411.9 ft) tall mountain Ruten.

The Grønkjølen Nature Reserve was located in the extreme south of the municipality.

== Government ==
While it existed, Hemne Municipality was responsible for primary education (through 10th grade), outpatient health services, senior citizen services, welfare and other social services, zoning, economic development, and municipal roads and utilities. The municipality was governed by a municipal council of directly elected representatives. The mayor was indirectly elected by a vote of the municipal council. The municipality was under the jurisdiction of the Sør-Trøndelag District Court and the Frostating Court of Appeal. Waste management was from 1995 handled by the inter-municipal agency HAMOS Forvaltning.

=== Municipal council ===
The municipal council (Kommunestyre) of Hemne Municipality is made up of 23 representatives that are elected to four year terms. The tables below show the historical composition of the council by political party.

Hemne kommunestyre 2015–2019
| Party name (in Norwegian) | Number of representatives |
|---|---|
| Labour Party (Arbeiderpartiet) | 10 |
| Progress Party (Fremskrittspartiet) | 1 |
| Conservative Party (Høyre) | 2 |
| Christian Democratic Party (Kristelig Folkeparti) | 1 |
| Centre Party (Senterpartiet) | 7 |
| Hemne List (Hemnelista) | 2 |
| Total number of members: | 23 |

Hemne kommunestyre 2011–2015
| Party name (in Norwegian) | Number of representatives |
|---|---|
| Labour Party (Arbeiderpartiet) | 12 |
| Progress Party (Fremskrittspartiet) | 2 |
| Conservative Party (Høyre) | 2 |
| Christian Democratic Party (Kristelig Folkeparti) | 1 |
| Centre Party (Senterpartiet) | 4 |
| Hemne List (Hemnelista) | 2 |
| Total number of members: | 23 |

Hemne kommunestyre 2007–2011
| Party name (in Norwegian) | Number of representatives |
|---|---|
| Labour Party (Arbeiderpartiet) | 10 |
| Progress Party (Fremskrittspartiet) | 2 |
| Conservative Party (Høyre) | 2 |
| Christian Democratic Party (Kristelig Folkeparti) | 1 |
| Centre Party (Senterpartiet) | 6 |
| Hemne List (Hemnelista) | 2 |
| Total number of members: | 23 |

Hemne kommunestyre 2003–2007
| Party name (in Norwegian) | Number of representatives |
|---|---|
| Labour Party (Arbeiderpartiet) | 10 |
| Progress Party (Fremskrittspartiet) | 1 |
| Conservative Party (Høyre) | 2 |
| Christian Democratic Party (Kristelig Folkeparti) | 1 |
| Centre Party (Senterpartiet) | 7 |
| Hemne List (Hemnelista) | 4 |
| Total number of members: | 25 |

Hemne kommunestyre 1999–2003
| Party name (in Norwegian) | Number of representatives |
|---|---|
| Labour Party (Arbeiderpartiet) | 11 |
| Conservative Party (Høyre) | 2 |
| Christian Democratic Party (Kristelig Folkeparti) | 1 |
| Joint list of the Centre Party (Senterpartiet) and the Liberal Party (Venstre) | 7 |
| Hemne List (Hemnelista) | 4 |
| Total number of members: | 25 |

Hemne kommunestyre 1995–1999
| Party name (in Norwegian) | Number of representatives |
|---|---|
| Labour Party (Arbeiderpartiet) | 12 |
| Conservative Party (Høyre) | 2 |
| Christian Democratic Party (Kristelig Folkeparti) | 2 |
| Centre Party (Senterpartiet) | 7 |
| Hemne List (Hemnelista) | 2 |
| Total number of members: | 25 |

Hemne kommunestyre 1991–1995
| Party name (in Norwegian) | Number of representatives |
|---|---|
| Labour Party (Arbeiderpartiet) | 13 |
| Conservative Party (Høyre) | 3 |
| Christian Democratic Party (Kristelig Folkeparti) | 2 |
| Centre Party (Senterpartiet) | 7 |
| Socialist Left Party (Sosialistisk Venstreparti) | 1 |
| Liberal Party (Venstre) | 1 |
| Hemne List (Hemnelista) | 2 |
| Total number of members: | 29 |

Hemne kommunestyre 1987–1991
| Party name (in Norwegian) | Number of representatives |
|---|---|
| Labour Party (Arbeiderpartiet) | 15 |
| Conservative Party (Høyre) | 4 |
| Christian Democratic Party (Kristelig Folkeparti) | 2 |
| Centre Party (Senterpartiet) | 5 |
| Socialist Left Party (Sosialistisk Venstreparti) | 2 |
| Liberal Party (Venstre) | 1 |
| Total number of members: | 29 |

Hemne kommunestyre 1983–1987
| Party name (in Norwegian) | Number of representatives |
|---|---|
| Labour Party (Arbeiderpartiet) | 14 |
| Conservative Party (Høyre) | 5 |
| Christian Democratic Party (Kristelig Folkeparti) | 2 |
| Centre Party (Senterpartiet) | 6 |
| Socialist Left Party (Sosialistisk Venstreparti) | 1 |
| Liberal Party (Venstre) | 1 |
| Total number of members: | 29 |

Hemne kommunestyre 1979–1983
| Party name (in Norwegian) | Number of representatives |
|---|---|
| Labour Party (Arbeiderpartiet) | 12 |
| Conservative Party (Høyre) | 5 |
| Christian Democratic Party (Kristelig Folkeparti) | 3 |
| Centre Party (Senterpartiet) | 6 |
| Socialist Left Party (Sosialistisk Venstreparti) | 2 |
| Liberal Party (Venstre) | 1 |
| Total number of members: | 29 |

Hemne kommunestyre 1975–1979
| Party name (in Norwegian) | Number of representatives |
|---|---|
| Labour Party (Arbeiderpartiet) | 13 |
| Conservative Party (Høyre) | 3 |
| Christian Democratic Party (Kristelig Folkeparti) | 4 |
| Socialist Left Party (Sosialistisk Venstreparti) | 1 |
| Joint list of the Centre Party (Senterpartiet) and the Liberal Party (Venstre) | 8 |
| Total number of members: | 29 |

Hemne kommunestyre 1971–1975
| Party name (in Norwegian) | Number of representatives |
|---|---|
| Labour Party (Arbeiderpartiet) | 14 |
| Conservative Party (Høyre) | 2 |
| Christian Democratic Party (Kristelig Folkeparti) | 3 |
| Centre Party (Senterpartiet) | 8 |
| Socialist People's Party (Sosialistisk Folkeparti) | 1 |
| Liberal Party (Venstre) | 1 |
| Total number of members: | 29 |

Hemne kommunestyre 1967–1971
| Party name (in Norwegian) | Number of representatives |
|---|---|
| Labour Party (Arbeiderpartiet) | 14 |
| Conservative Party (Høyre) | 2 |
| Christian Democratic Party (Kristelig Folkeparti) | 3 |
| Centre Party (Senterpartiet) | 7 |
| Socialist People's Party (Sosialistisk Folkeparti) | 1 |
| Liberal Party (Venstre) | 2 |
| Total number of members: | 29 |

Hemne kommunestyre 1963–1967
| Party name (in Norwegian) | Number of representatives |
|---|---|
| Labour Party (Arbeiderpartiet) | 15 |
| Conservative Party (Høyre) | 2 |
| Christian Democratic Party (Kristelig Folkeparti) | 3 |
| Centre Party (Senterpartiet) | 8 |
| Liberal Party (Venstre) | 1 |
| Total number of members: | 29 |

Hemne herredsstyre 1959–1963
| Party name (in Norwegian) | Number of representatives |
|---|---|
| Labour Party (Arbeiderpartiet) | 10 |
| Conservative Party (Høyre) | 2 |
| Christian Democratic Party (Kristelig Folkeparti) | 3 |
| Centre Party (Senterpartiet) | 5 |
| Liberal Party (Venstre) | 1 |
| Total number of members: | 21 |

Hemne herredsstyre 1955–1959
| Party name (in Norwegian) | Number of representatives |
|---|---|
| Labour Party (Arbeiderpartiet) | 11 |
| Conservative Party (Høyre) | 1 |
| Christian Democratic Party (Kristelig Folkeparti) | 2 |
| Farmers' Party (Bondepartiet) | 5 |
| Liberal Party (Venstre) | 2 |
| Total number of members: | 21 |

Hemne herredsstyre 1951–1955
| Party name (in Norwegian) | Number of representatives |
|---|---|
| Labour Party (Arbeiderpartiet) | 9 |
| Conservative Party (Høyre) | 2 |
| Christian Democratic Party (Kristelig Folkeparti) | 3 |
| Farmers' Party (Bondepartiet) | 3 |
| Liberal Party (Venstre) | 1 |
| Total number of members: | 20 |

Hemne herredsstyre 1947–1951
| Party name (in Norwegian) | Number of representatives |
|---|---|
| Labour Party (Arbeiderpartiet) | 9 |
| Conservative Party (Høyre) | 1 |
| Christian Democratic Party (Kristelig Folkeparti) | 3 |
| Farmers' Party (Bondepartiet) | 5 |
| Liberal Party (Venstre) | 2 |
| Total number of members: | 20 |

Hemne herredsstyre 1945–1947
| Party name (in Norwegian) | Number of representatives |
|---|---|
| Labour Party (Arbeiderpartiet) | 10 |
| Conservative Party (Høyre) | 1 |
| Christian Democratic Party (Kristelig Folkeparti) | 3 |
| Farmers' Party (Bondepartiet) | 4 |
| Liberal Party (Venstre) | 2 |
| Total number of members: | 20 |

Hemne herredsstyre 1937–1941*
| Party name (in Norwegian) | Number of representatives |
|---|---|
| Labour Party (Arbeiderpartiet) | 9 |
| Farmers' Party (Bondepartiet) | 7 |
| Joint List(s) of Non-Socialist Parties (Borgerlige Felleslister) | 4 |
| Total number of members: | 20 |
Note: Due to the German occupation of Norway during World War II, no elections were held for new municipal councils until after the war ended in 1945.

=== Mayors ===
The mayor (Norwegian: ordfører) of Hemne Municipality was the political leader of the municipality and the chairperson of the municipal council. Here is a list of people who held this position:

- 1838–1838: Johan Sophus Lossius
- 1838–1839: Lars Pedersen Strand
- 1840–1843: Christian Sophonias Kiøbing Borch
- 1844–1855: Lars Arntsen Lian
- 1856–1863: Lars Pedersen Moe
- 1864–1871: Mogens Marcus Wessel
- 1872–1877: Kristoffer Johnsen Øye
- 1878–1881: John Larsen Moe (H)
- 1882–1885: Lars Ingebrigtsen Sinnes
- 1886–1889: John Johnsen Vaagan (V)
- 1890–1890: Georg Severin Schjelderup (H)
- 1890–1901: John Larsen Moe (H)
- 1902–1907: Peder Larsen Moe (H)
- 1908–1922: Lars Johnsen Moe (V)
- 1923–1924: Haakon Myrholt (V)
- 1924–1934: Ingvald Tøndel (Bp)
- 1935–1945: Steinar Alstad (Bp/NS)
- 1946–1947: Håkon Fagervoll (Ap)
- 1948–1955: John Johnsen Moe (Bp)
- 1956–1959: Ole Kjønsvik (Ap)
- 1960–1963: Severin Witsø (Sp)
- 1964–1975: Ole Kjønsvik (Ap)
- 1976–1987: Gunnar Bjørkøy (Sp)
- 1988–2003: Johan Stølan (Ap)
- 2003–2007: Gunnar Hynne (Sp)
- 2007–2015: Ståle Vaag (Ap)
- 2015–2019: Odd Jarle Svanem (Sp)

== Notable people ==
- Arne Heimsjø (1915–1989), a Norwegian military officer

== See also ==
- List of former municipalities of Norway
