= Vinje Municipality (Sør-Trøndelag) =

Former municipality in Trøndelag, Norway

Vinje Municipality Vinje herred
- Former municipality
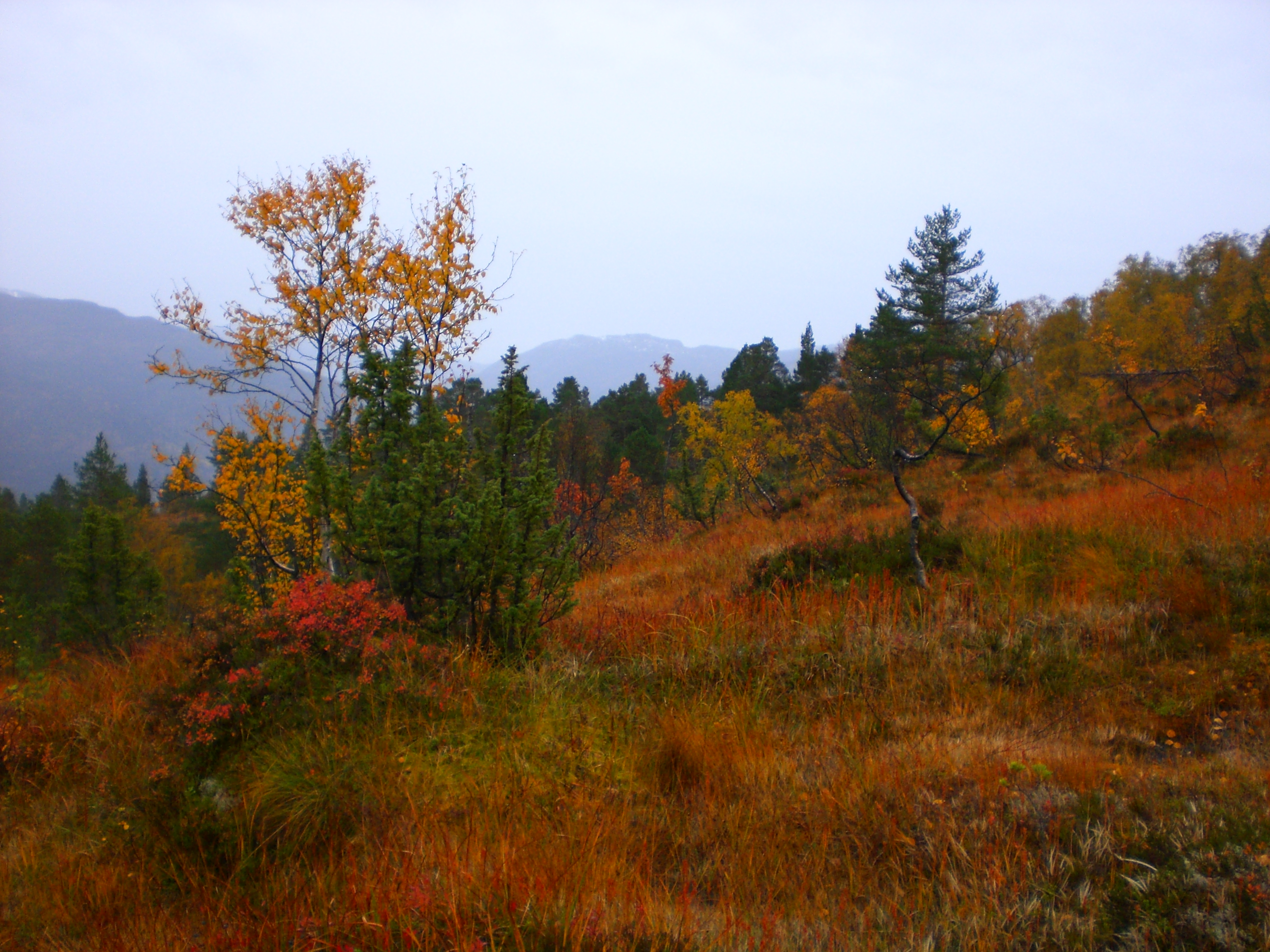
- Hills near Vinjeøra

- Sør-Trøndelag within Norway

- Vinje within Sør-Trøndelag
- Coordinates: 63°12′21″N 08°59′09″E
- Country: Norway
- County: Sør-Trøndelag
- District: Fosen
- Established: 1 July 1924
  - Preceded by: Hemne Municipality
- Disestablished: 1 Jan 1964
  - Succeeded by: Hemne Municipality
- Administrative centre: Vinjeøra

Government
  - Mayor (1960–1963): Leif Lomundal (Sp)

Area (upon dissolution)
  - Total: 223.1 km^{2} (86.1 sq mi)
  - Rank: #348 in Norway
- Highest elevation: 1,040 m (3,410 ft)

Population (1963)
  - Total: 572
  - Rank: #673 in Norway
  - Density: 2.6/km^{2} (6.7/sq mi)
  - Change (10 years): ▼ −4.7%
- Demonym: Vinje-folk

Official language
  - Norwegian form: Neutral
- Time zone: UTC+01:00 (CET)
  - Summer (DST): UTC+02:00 (CEST)
- ISO 3166 code: NO-1611

Vinje is a former municipality in the old Sør-Trøndelag county, Norway. The 223-square-kilometre (86 sq mi) municipality existed from 1924 until its dissolution in 1964. The municipality encompassed the areas around the inner Vinjefjorden and the Søo river valley in what is now the southern part of the present-day Heim Municipality. The administrative centre was the village of Vinjeøra. The lake Vasslivatnet was located in the eastern part of Vinje.

Prior to its dissolution in 1963, the 223-square-kilometre (86 sq mi) municipality was the 348th largest by area out of the 689 municipalities in Norway. Vinje Municipality was the 673rd most populous municipality in Norway with a population of about 572. The municipality's population density was 2.6 inhabitants per square kilometre (6.7/sq mi) and its population had decreased by 4.7% over the previous 10-year period.

== General information ==
Originally (since 1838), Vinje was a part of Hemne Municipality (see formannskapsdistrikt law). Historically, the parish annex of Vinje actually belonged to Romsdalen county while the main parish of Hemne belonged to Søndre Trondhjem county. But according to the 1837 formannskapsdistrikt law, a parish could no longer be divided between two counties, so the annex of Vinje had to be transferred to the county of Søndre Trondhjem.

On 1 July 1924, the large Hemne Municipality was divided into three parts: Vinje Municipality (population: 716) in the south, Snillfjord Municipality (population: 776) in the east, and the rest of the municipality (population: 2,030) remained as Hemne Municipality. During the 1960s, there were many municipal mergers across Norway due to the work of the Schei Committee. On 1 January 1964, Vinje Municipality (population: 576), Hemne Municipality (population: 2,325), and the western part of Heim Municipality (population: 711) were merged to form a new, enlarged Hemne Municipality.

=== Name ===
The municipality (originally the parish) is named after the old Vinje farm (Old Norse: Vinjar) since the first Vinje Church was built there. The name is the plural form of vin which means "meadow" or "pasture".

=== Churches ===
The Church of Norway had one parish (sokn) within Vinje Municipality. At the time of the municipal dissolution, it was part of the Hemne prestegjeld and the Sør-Fosen prosti (deanery) in the Diocese of Nidaros.

Churches in Vinje Municipality
Parish (sokn)	Church name	Location of the church	Year built
Vinje	Vinje Church	Vinjeøra	1820

== Geography ==
The municipality was located at the innermost part of the Vinjefjorden. The highest point in the municipality was the 1,040-metre (3,410 ft) tall mountain Ruten, located on the border with Rindal Municipality. Hemne Municipality was located to the north, Orkdal Municipality was to the east, Rindal Municipality and Surnadal Municipality were to the south, and Åsskard Municipality and Aure Municipality were to the west.

== Government ==
While it existed, Vinje Municipality was responsible for primary education (through 10th grade), outpatient health services, senior citizen services, welfare and other social services, zoning, economic development, and municipal roads and utilities. The municipality was governed by a municipal council of directly elected representatives. The mayor was indirectly elected by a vote of the municipal council. The municipality was under the jurisdiction of the Frostating Court of Appeal.

=== Municipal council ===
The municipal council (Herredsstyre) of Vinje Municipality was made up of 13 representatives that were elected to four year terms. The tables below show the historical composition of the council by political party.

Vinje herredsstyre 1959–1963
Party name (in Norwegian)	Number of representatives
Labour Party (Arbeiderpartiet)	4
Joint List(s) of Non-Socialist Parties (Borgerlige Felleslister)	9
Total number of members:	13

Vinje herredsstyre 1955–1959
Party name (in Norwegian)	Number of representatives
Labour Party (Arbeiderpartiet)	4
Joint List(s) of Non-Socialist Parties (Borgerlige Felleslister)	9
Total number of members:	13

Vinje herredsstyre 1951–1955
Party name (in Norwegian)	Number of representatives
Labour Party (Arbeiderpartiet)	3
Joint List(s) of Non-Socialist Parties (Borgerlige Felleslister)	9
Total number of members:	12

Vinje herredsstyre 1947–1951
Party name (in Norwegian)	Number of representatives
List of workers, fishermen, and small farmholders (Arbeidere, fiskere, småbrukere liste)	4
Local List(s) (Lokale lister)	8
Total number of members:	12

Vinje herredsstyre 1945–1947
Party name (in Norwegian)	Number of representatives
Local List(s) (Lokale lister)	12
Total number of members:	12

Vinje herredsstyre 1937–1941*
Party name (in Norwegian)	Number of representatives
Labour Party (Arbeiderpartiet)	5
Farmers' Party (Bondepartiet)	4
Local List(s) (Lokale lister)	3
Total number of members:	12
Note: Due to the German occupation of Norway during World War II, no elections were held for new municipal councils until after the war ended in 1945.

=== Mayors ===
The mayor (Norwegian: ordfører) of Vinje Municipality was the political leader of the municipality and the chairperson of the municipal council. Here is a list of people who held this position:

- 1924–1934: Lars Hjorthol (Bp)
- 1935–1937: Edvard Stølen (Bp)
- 1938–1940: Fredrik Hofset (V)
- 1941–1942: Lars Hjorthol (Bp)
- 1942–1945: Arne Grimsmo (NS)
- 1945–1945: Fredrik Hofset (V)
- 1946–1955: Ole Grønset (KrF)
- 1956–1959: Lars Grønset Hjorthol (Bp)
- 1960–1963: Leif Lomundal (Sp)

== See also ==
- List of former municipalities of Norway
