= Ruten =

Ruten may refer to:

== Places ==
- Ruten, Germany, a village in Lower Saxony, Germany
- Ruten (Heim), a mountain on the border of Heim Municipality and Rindal Municipality in Trøndelag county, Norway
- Ruten (Oppland), a mountain in Nord-Fron Municipality in Innlandet county, Norway
- Ruten (Selbu), a mountain in Selbu Municipality in Trøndelag county, Norway
- Ruten (Troms), a mountain in Målselv Municipality in Troms county, Norway

== Other ==
- Kōya Ruten, the sixth single of J-pop duo FictionJunction Yuuka
- Ruten (length), the German plural word for the rod
