= Johns Knoll =

Antarctican ice knoll

- Location within Antarctica

Highest point
- Peak: 2024
- Coordinates: 71°59′S 7°59′E

Geography
- Location: Queen Maud Land, East Antarctica
- Parent range: Vinje Glacier

Johns Knoll is a crevassed ice knoll (apparently the ice surface reflection of the underlying rock) in the lower part of Vinje Glacier in Queen Maud Land, Antarctica. It was mapped from surveys and air photos by the Sixth Norwegian Antarctic Expedition (1956–60) and named Johnsbaen (John's sunken rock) for John Snuggerud, a radio technician with the expedition.
