= Svinje =

Svinje may refer to:

- Svinje (album), an album by the Serbian noise-rock band Klopka Za Pionira
- Vinje pri Moravčah, a settlement in the Municipality of Moravče, Slovenia, known as Svinje until 1955
