= Gunnar Hynne =

Norwegian politician (born 1953)

Gunnar Hynne (born 31 August 1953) is a Norwegian politician for the Centre Party.

He served as a deputy representative in the Norwegian Parliament from Sør-Trøndelag during the term 2005–2009.

On the local level Hynne was mayor of Hemne Municipality from 2003 to 2007.

Hynne is cousin of well-known American volcanologist David Richardson.
