= Rožek, Moravče =

Rožek
- Location in Slovenia
- Coordinates: 46°9′24″N 14°43′43″E
- Country: Slovenia
- Traditional region: Upper Carniola
- Statistical region: Central Slovenia
- Municipality: Moravče
- Elevation: 399 m (1,309 ft)

Rožek (Slovene pronunciation: [ɾɔˈʒɛːk]) is a former settlement in the Municipality of Moravče in central Slovenia. It is now part of the village of Vinje pri Moravčah. The area is part of the traditional region of Upper Carniola. The municipality is now included in the Central Slovenia Statistical Region.

== Geography ==
Rožek lies in the southern part of the village of Vinje pri Moravčah, southeast of the main part of the settlement.

== History ==
Rožek had a population of five living in one house in 1900. Rožek was annexed by Vinje pri Moravčah (at that time still called Svine) in 1952, ending its existence as an independent settlement.

== Rožek Castle ==
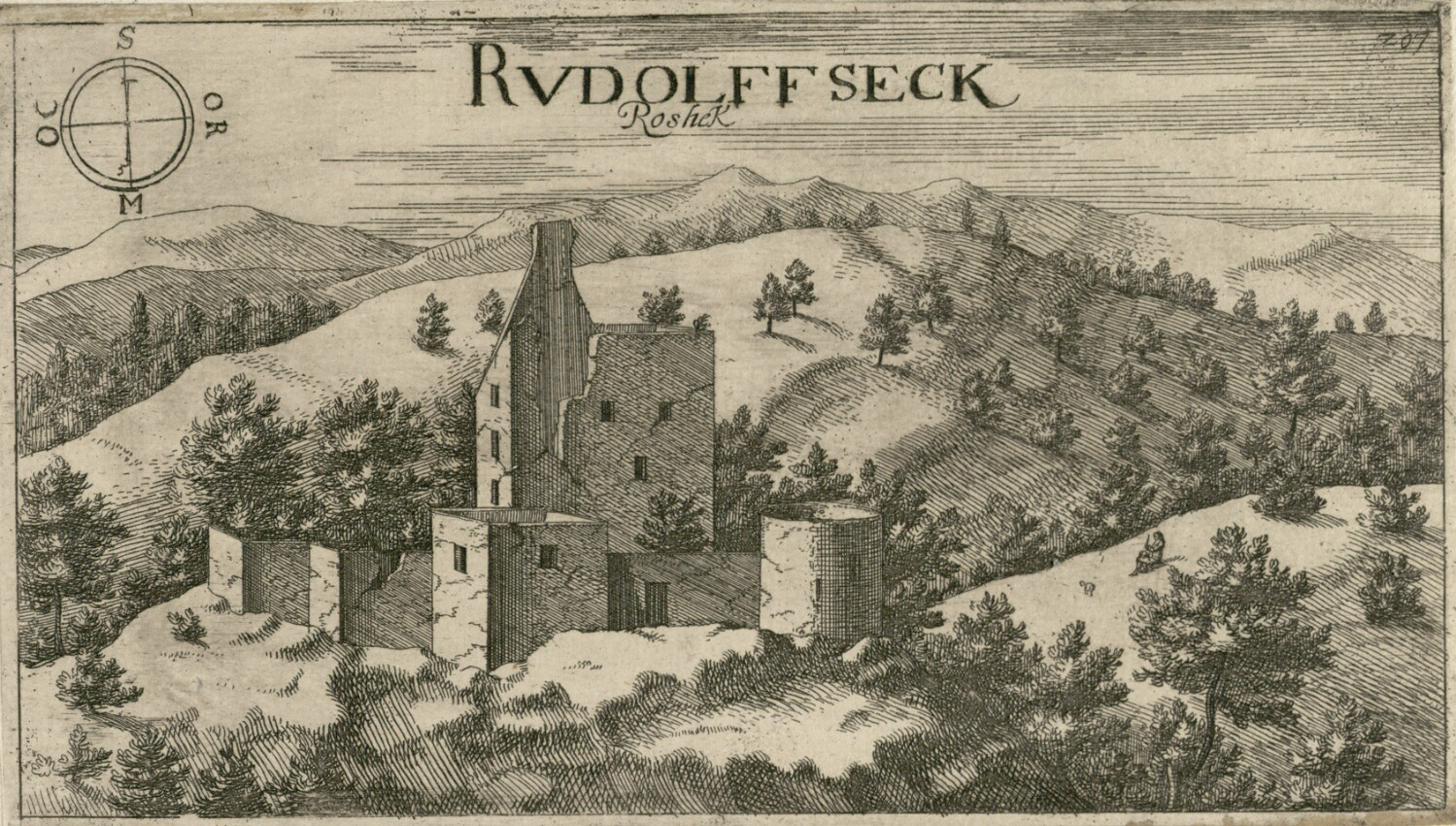
Rožek Castle ruins, 1679 engraving

The ruins of Rožek (Rudolfseck) Castle, first mentioned in written documents in 1247, can still be seen near the settlement. It was damaged in the peasant revolt of 1515. The castle owners, the Gall family, became fervent Protestants and a number of prominent Protestant figures were buried in the castle chapel. When the castle started to deteriorate in the 17th century, the castle dwellers relocated to other castles in Moravče and Češnjice pri Moravčah.
