= Søo =

River in Trøndelag, Norway

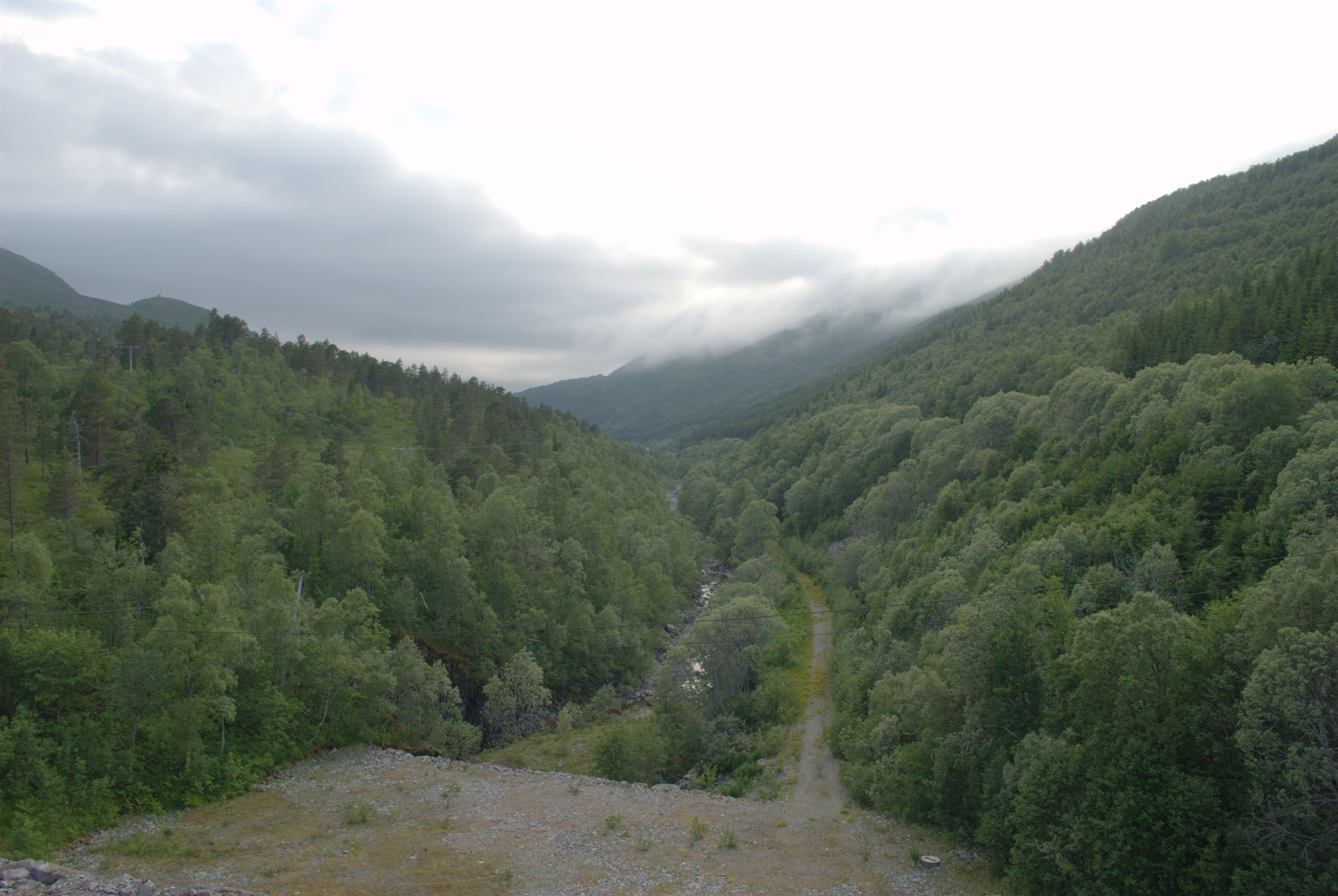
- The Søo seen from the dam at the west end of Lake Vasslivatnet
- Interactive map of the river

Location
- Country: Norway
- County: Trøndelag
- Municipality: Heim Municipality

Physical characteristics
- Source: Lake Søvatnet
  - location: Heim, Orkland, Rindal border
  - coordinates: 63°13′24″N 09°18′32″E
  - elevation: 270 metres (890 ft)
- Mouth: Hemnfjorden
  - location: Kyrksæterøra, Heim Municipality
  - coordinates: 63°17′38″N 09°05′19″E
  - elevation: 0 metres (0 ft)
- Length: 30 km (19 mi)
- Basin size: 237.93 km^{2} (91.87 sq mi)

The Søo is a river in Heim Municipality in Trøndelag county, Norway. The 30-kilometer (19 mi) long river originates at Lake Søo (Søvatnet), which lies on the border of Orkland Municipality, Heim Municipality, and Rindal Municipality. The lake sits at an elevation of 280 meters (920 ft). It then flows into Lake Vassli (Vasslivatnet), which sits at roughly the same elevation, depending on levels behind the dam. The inflow to the Søo is regulated by a dam 20 meters (66 ft) high at the west end of Lake Vassli, which serves as a regulation reservoir for the Søa Hydroelectric Power Station.

Its course flows from Lake Vassli through the Søo Valley (Søvassdalen) parallel to European route E39 highway. Further down towards the village of Vinjeøra, it turns northward about 2 kilometers (1.2 mi) east of the village. Norwegian County Road 680 follows the river northwards as flows into Lake Ro (Rovatnet; 13 meters or 43 feet). As the water exits the lake, it proceeds about 2 kilometers (1.2 mi) to the east through the village of Kyrksæterøra before it empties into in the Hemnfjorden.

== See also ==
- List of rivers in Norway
