= Arne Heimsjø =

Norwegian military officer (1915–1989)

- Born: 28 December 1915; Hemne Municipality, Norway
- Died: 18 April 1989 (aged 73)
- Education: NATO Defense College
- Military career
- Allegiance: Norway
- Branch: Norwegian Army
- Rank: Major General
- Conflicts: Second World War

Arne Heimsjø (28 December 1915 – 18 April 1989) was a Norwegian military officer.

He was born in Hemne Municipality as a son of lieutenant Anders Heimsjø. He was graduated from the 5th Division academy in 1935 and police academy in 1937, before becoming an officer in 1940. During the Second World War he participated in fighting as a platoon leader in Infantry Regiment 6. He fled to Sweden in 1941, spent time in Stockholm before continuing to the UK. He served as a platoon leader in the Norwegian Brigade, before training Norwegian police troops in Sweden from 1944 to 1945. He was decorated with the Defence Medal 1940–1945 and the Haakon VII 70th Anniversary Medal.

From being sergeant in 1935 he went through the ranks of ensign (fenrik) in 1937, lieutenant in 1943, captain in 1947 and major in 1950. In that year he graduated from the Army Staff College in the UK; he also took the NATO Defence College in 1963. From 1948 to 1950 he was a secretary in the Army Officers Association. He was promoted further to lieutenant colonel in 1953, colonel in 1960 and major general in 1972. He led the district command in Trøndelag from 1972 until his retirement in 1979.

Heimsjø was also a member of the disaster preparedness council, Norsk Katastroferåd. Before the 1981 Norwegian parliamentary election he was a minor ballot candidate for the Liberal People's Party. He died 18 April 1989.
