= Sollia (Fjordruta) =

Hiking lodge in Trøndelag, Norway

Coordinates: 63.2079°N 8.8719°E

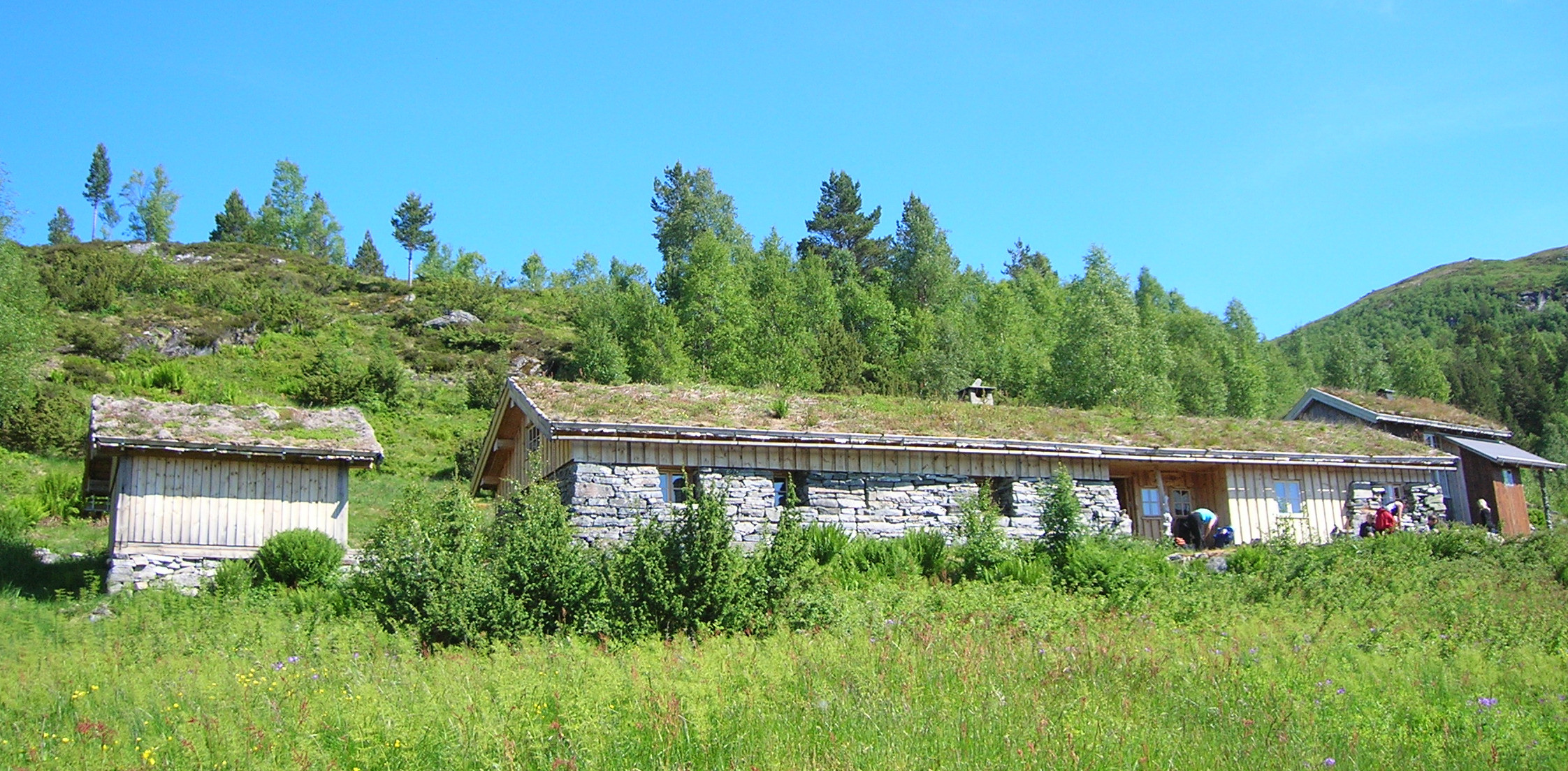
View of Sollia

Location in Trøndelag

Sollia is a hiking lodge along the Vinjefjorden in Heim Municipality in Trøndelag county, Norway. It is located about 7 kilometres (4.3 mi) west of the village of Vinjeøra.

A hikers' trail goes steep uphill at first, through woods of spruce and birch, up to barren mountain moorland, interspersed with a few evergreens, mountain birches, and rocks, in a heather-moss-lichen-coloured setting. The 3-hour-long moderately difficult hike goes along a marked mountain ridge trail, passing small lakes and streams, a few private cabins, and offering views of the fjord far below and the surrounding mountain areas. Sollia is one of several small self-service lodges in the Fjordruta hiking trail, operated by KNT, a part of the hikers’ association of the Kristiansund and Nordmøre area.

The Sollia lodge overlooks the Vinjefjorden from 310 metres (1,020 ft) up the mountain. The small lodge itself, accommodating a maximum of 15-20 hikers, is a restored (finished in 2003) cow/sheep barn of an old mountain dairy farm with its stone walls intact offering an overnight stay in a candlelit and fireplace-warming evening atmosphere.

From Sollia, hikers can visit other lodges such as Storfiskhytta to the north and Storlisetra to the south (across the fjord) are nearby.

== Media gallery ==
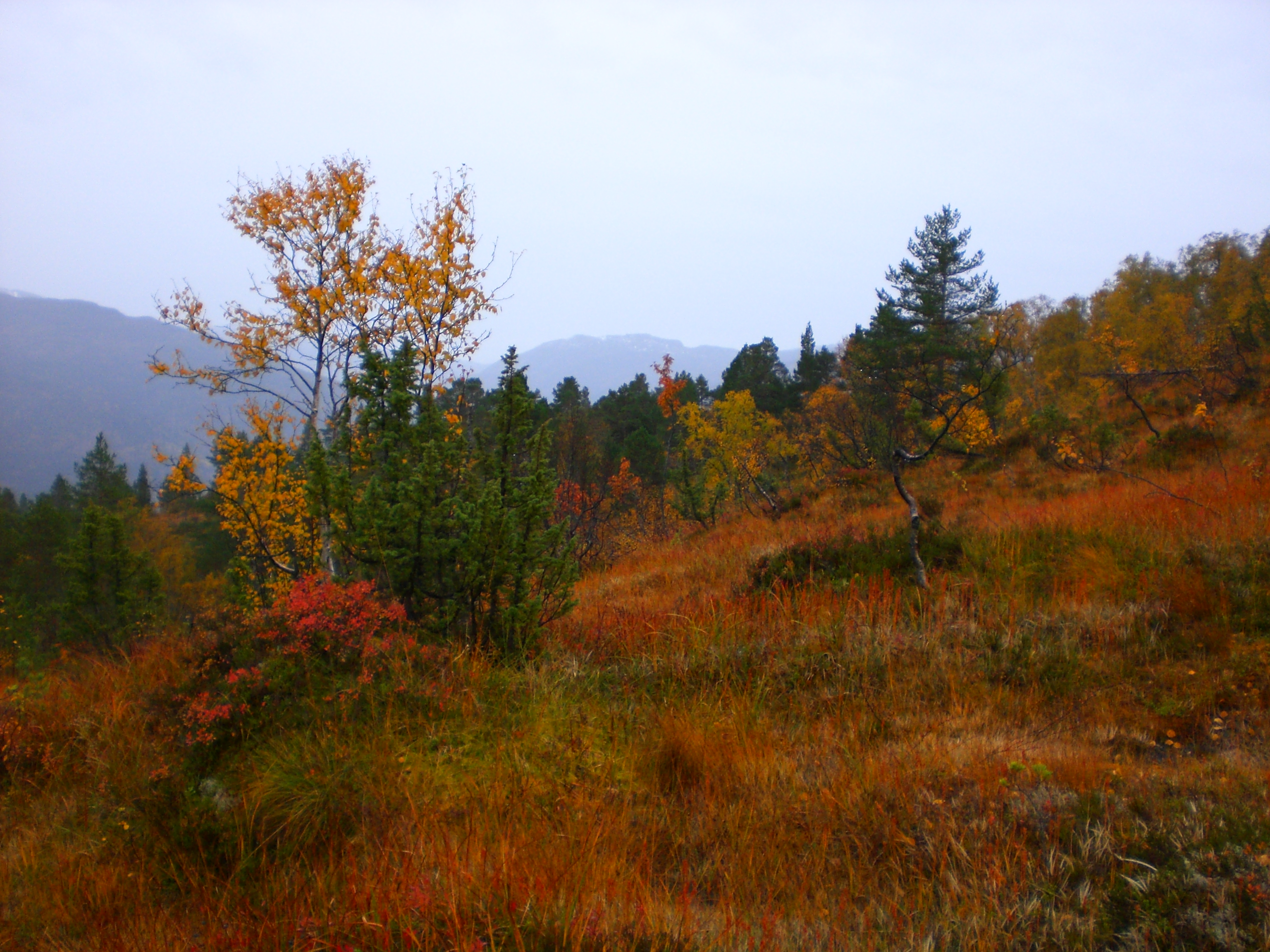
Uphill from Vinjeøra

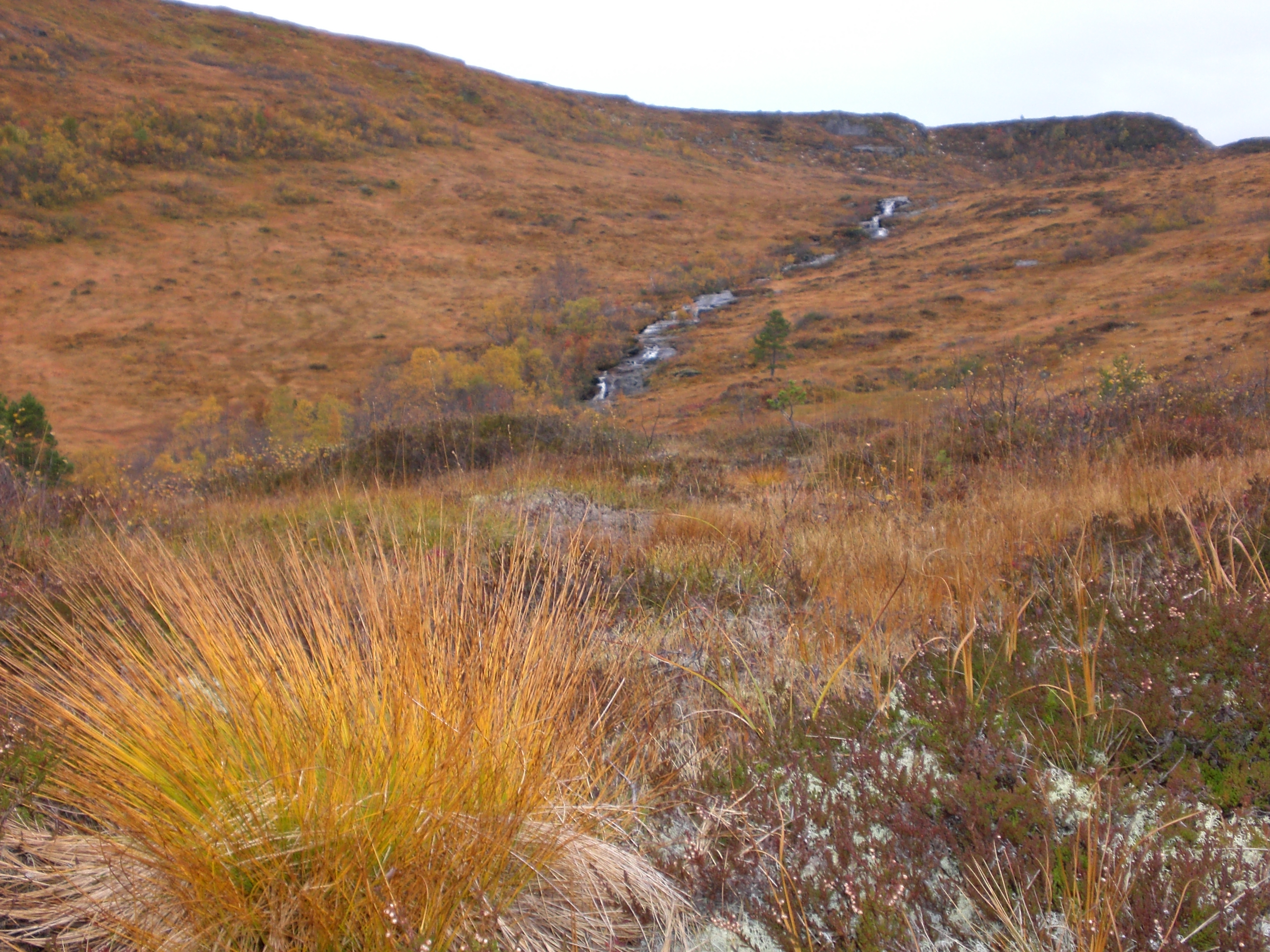
Almost above the treeline

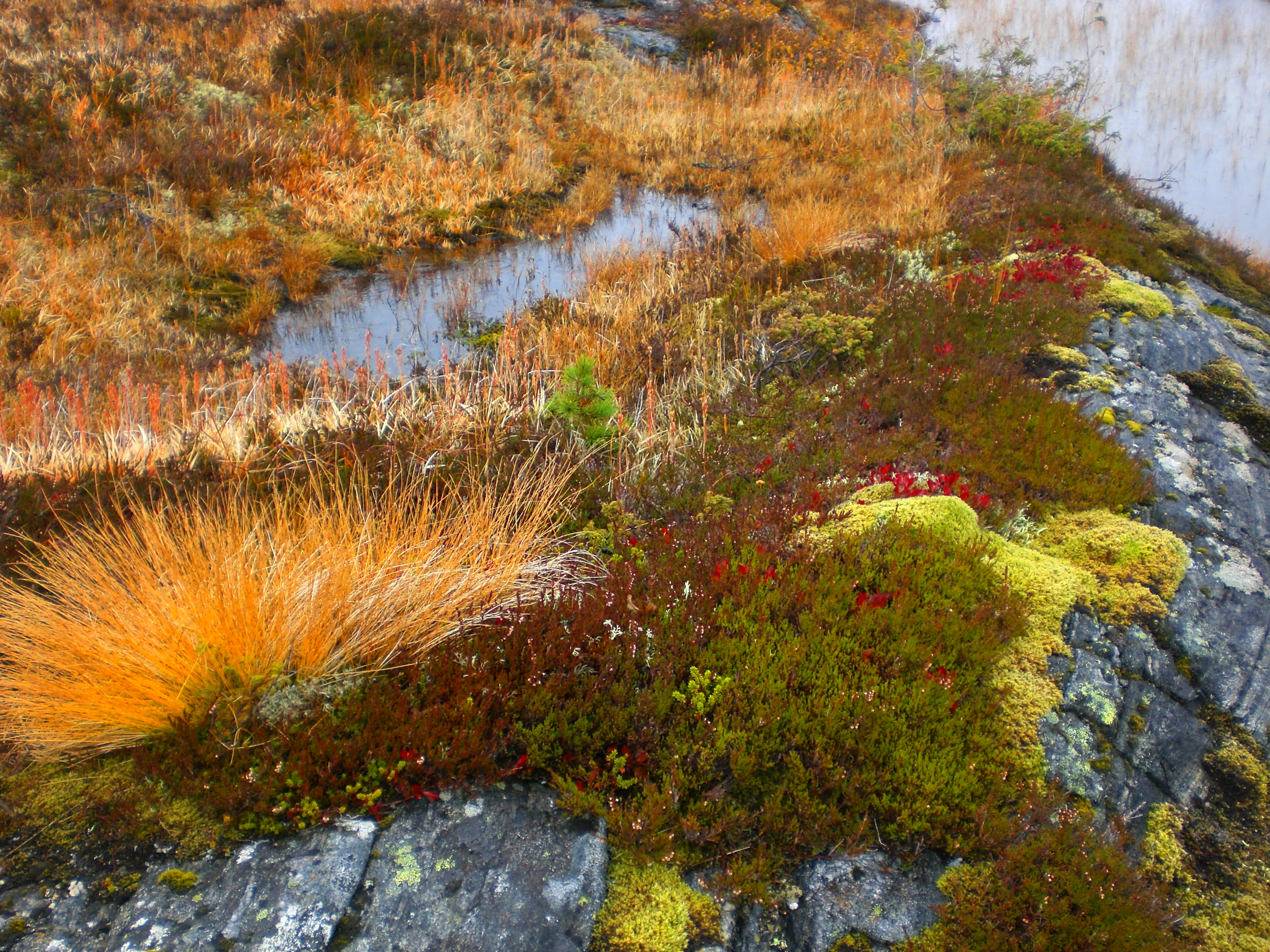
Rock, moss, lichen etc.

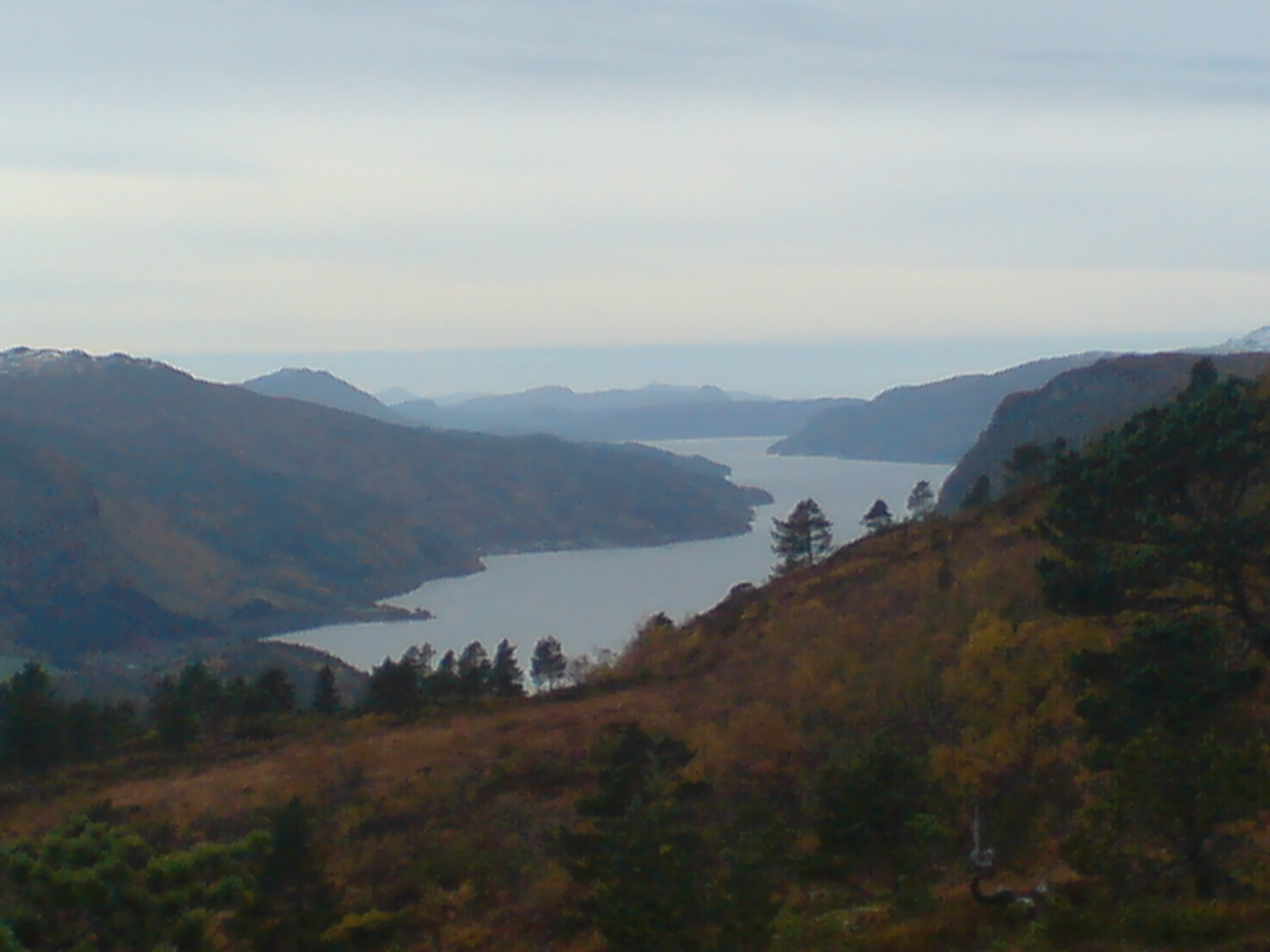
View of Vinjefjorden

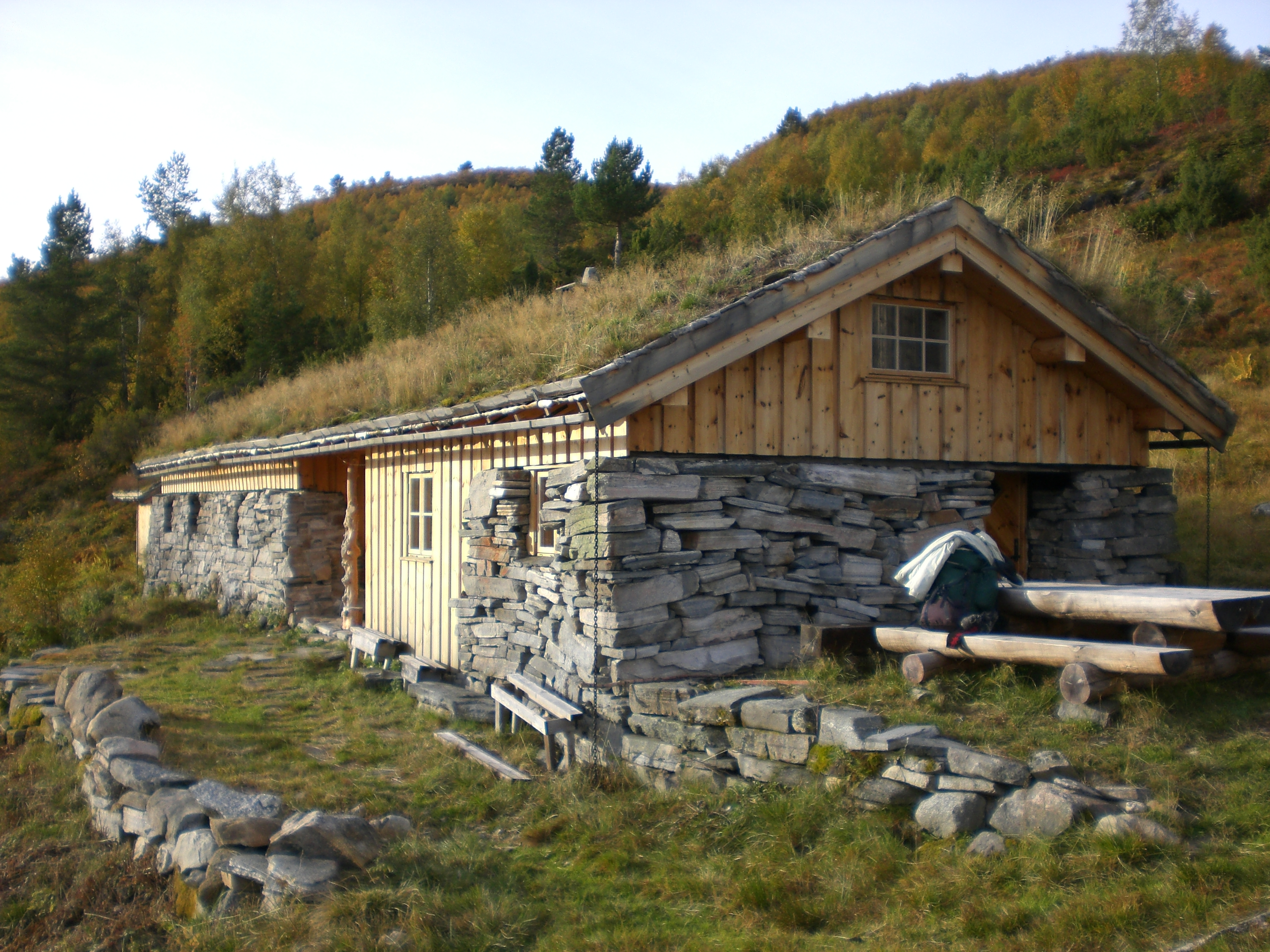
Self-service lodge Sollia

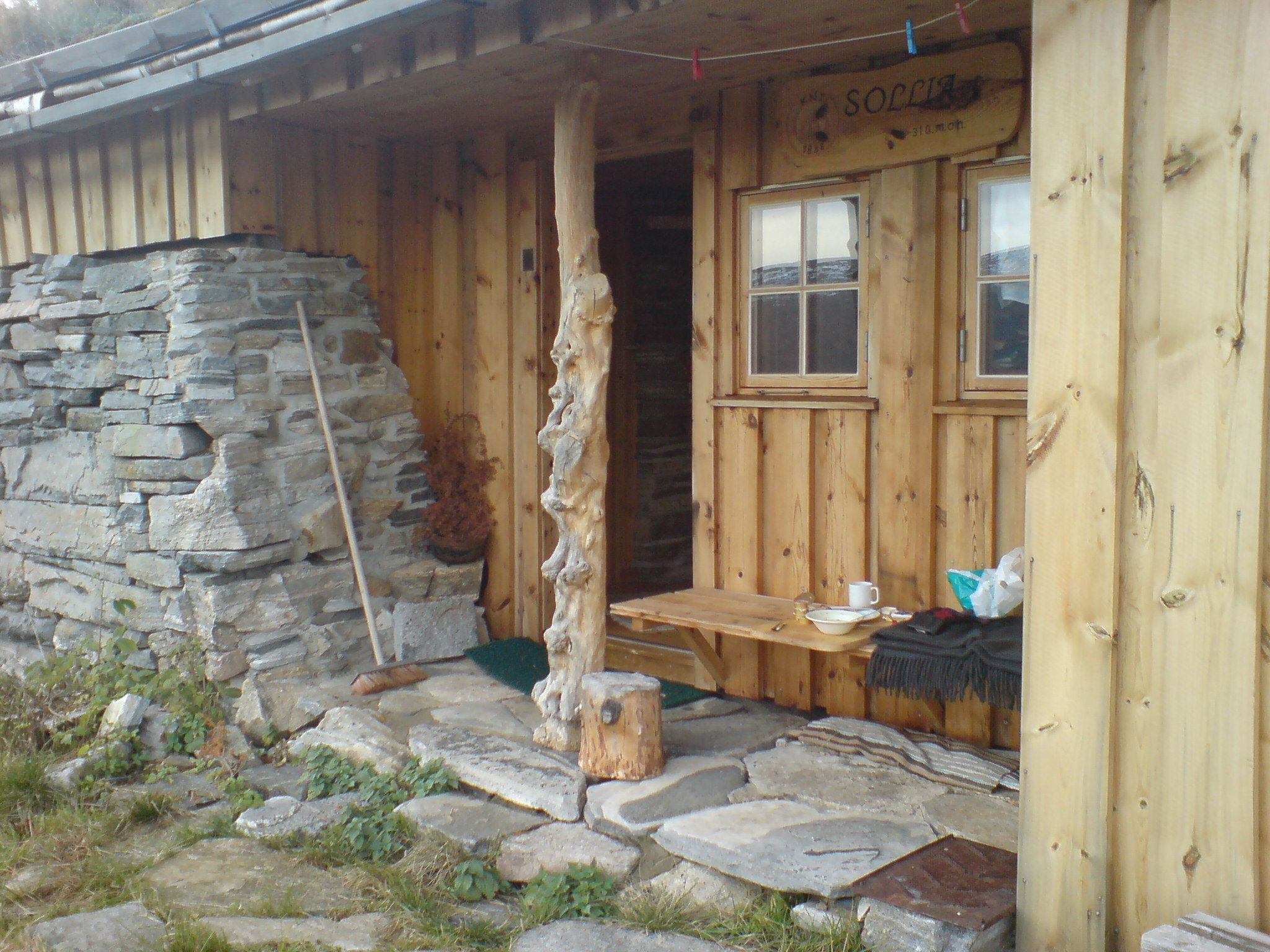
Entrance details

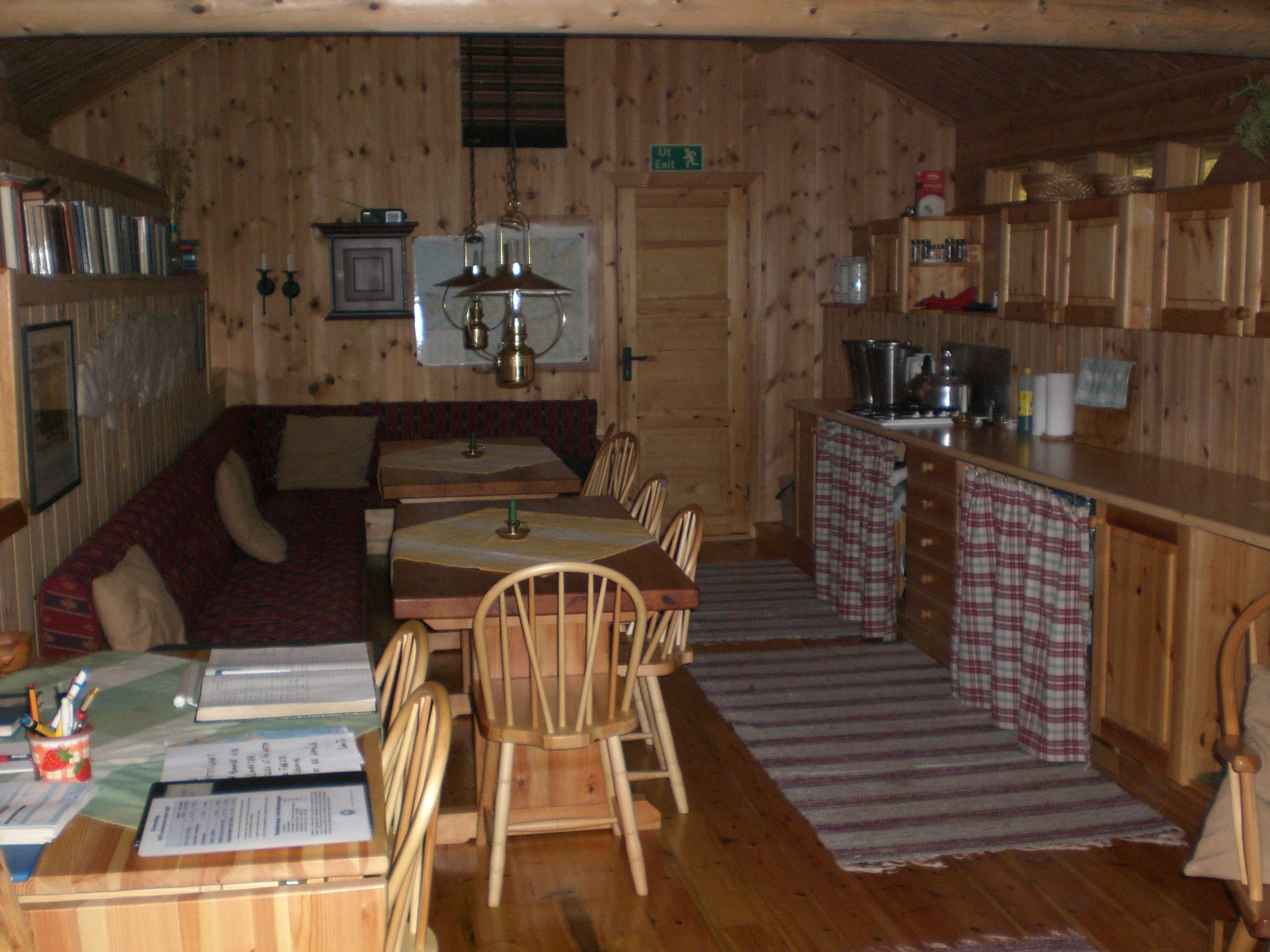
Lodge common room
