= Vinjeøra =

Village in Heim Municipality, Norway

- Village
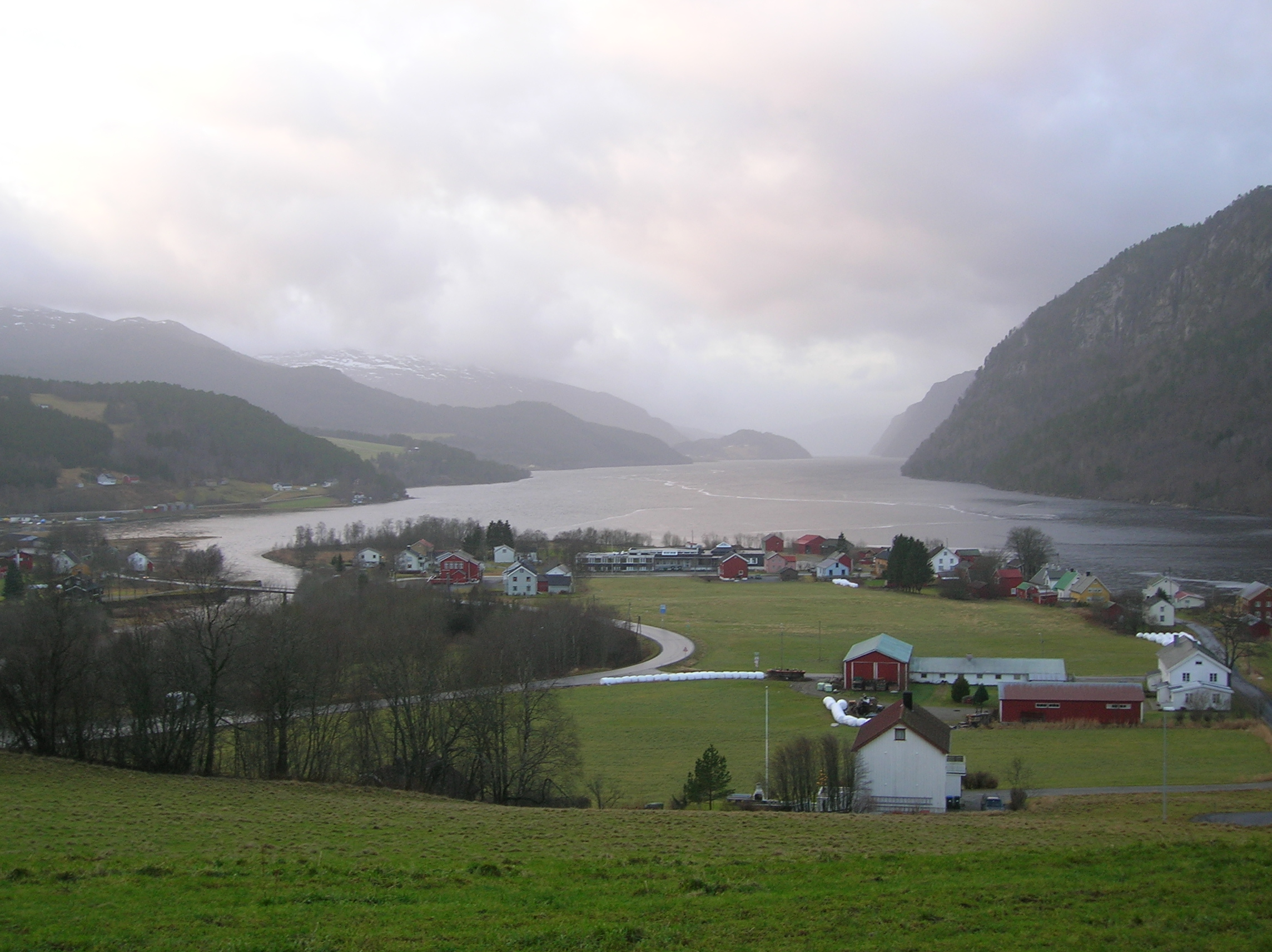
- View of the village
- Interactive map of Vinjeøra
- Location within Trøndelag Location within Norway
- Coordinates: 63.2064°N 08.9847°E
- Country: Norway
- Region: Central Norway
- County: Trøndelag
- District: Fosen
- Municipality: Heim Municipality
- Elevation: 5 m (16 ft)
- Time zone: UTC+01:00 (CET)
  - Summer (DST): UTC+02:00 (CEST)
- Post Code: 7203 Vinjeøra

Vinjeøra is a village in Heim Municipality, in the Trøndelag county of Norway. The village lies along the European route E39 highway, in particularly at the end of the Vinjefjorden and about 12 kilometres (7.5 mi) south of the municipal center of Kyrksæterøra. The village has a population of almost 300 people and is located about 95 km (59 mi) from the city of Trondheim and about 105 km (65 mi) from the city of Kristiansund.

Historically, Vinjeøra was the administrative centre of the old Vinje Municipality, which became a part of Hemne Municipality in 1964 (and then became part of Heim Municipality in 2020).

The Fjordruta hiking trail is operated by KNT, and has a number of hikes that are accessible from Vinjeøra, including Storlisetra, Sollia, and Storfiskhytta. The lake Vasslivatnet is located about 13 kilometres (8.1 mi) east of Vinjeøra. The mountain Ruten, the highest peak in Hemne, stands southeast of the village. The Vinje Church is located in the village of Vinjeøra.
