= Ruten (Heim) =

Mountain in Trøndelag, Norway

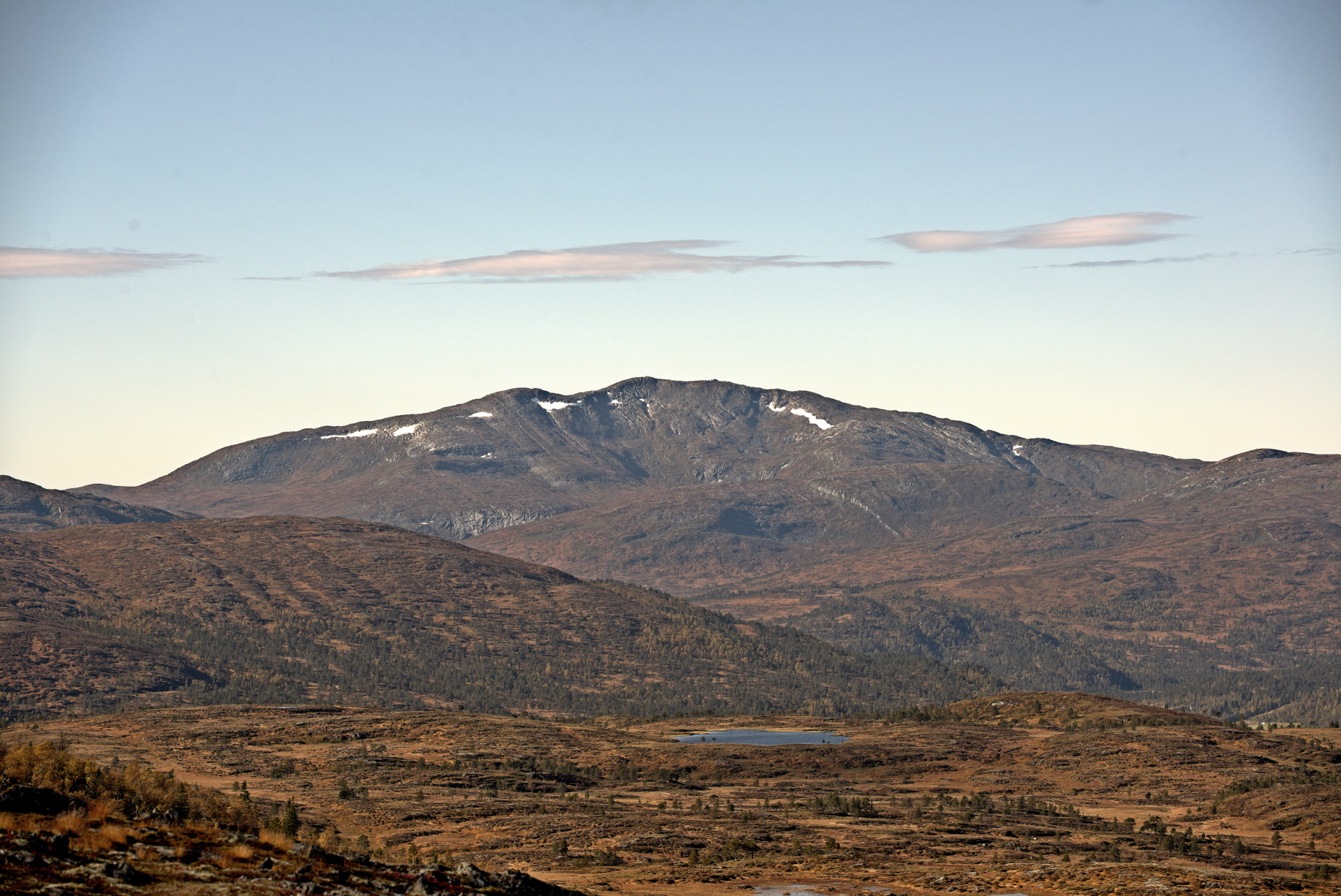
- Ruten seen from the mountain Vardfjellet

Highest point
- Elevation: 1,040 m (3,410 ft)
- Prominence: 742 m (2,434 ft)
- Isolation: 23.91 km (14.86 mi)
- Coordinates: 63.1730°N 09.1436°E

Geography
- Interactive map of the mountain
- Location: Trøndelag, Norway

Ruten is a mountain in Trøndelag county, Norway. The 1,040-meter (3,410 ft) tall mountain is located on the border Heim Municipality and Rindal Municipality. The mountain stands about 8 kilometers (5.0 mi) southeast of the village of Vinjeøra in Heim Municipality. This is the highest point in Heim Municipality. The mountain has a topographic prominence of 742 meters (2,434 ft) and a topographic isolation of 23.91 kilometers (14.86 mi).
