= Zavino =

Zavino Svino (until 1952)
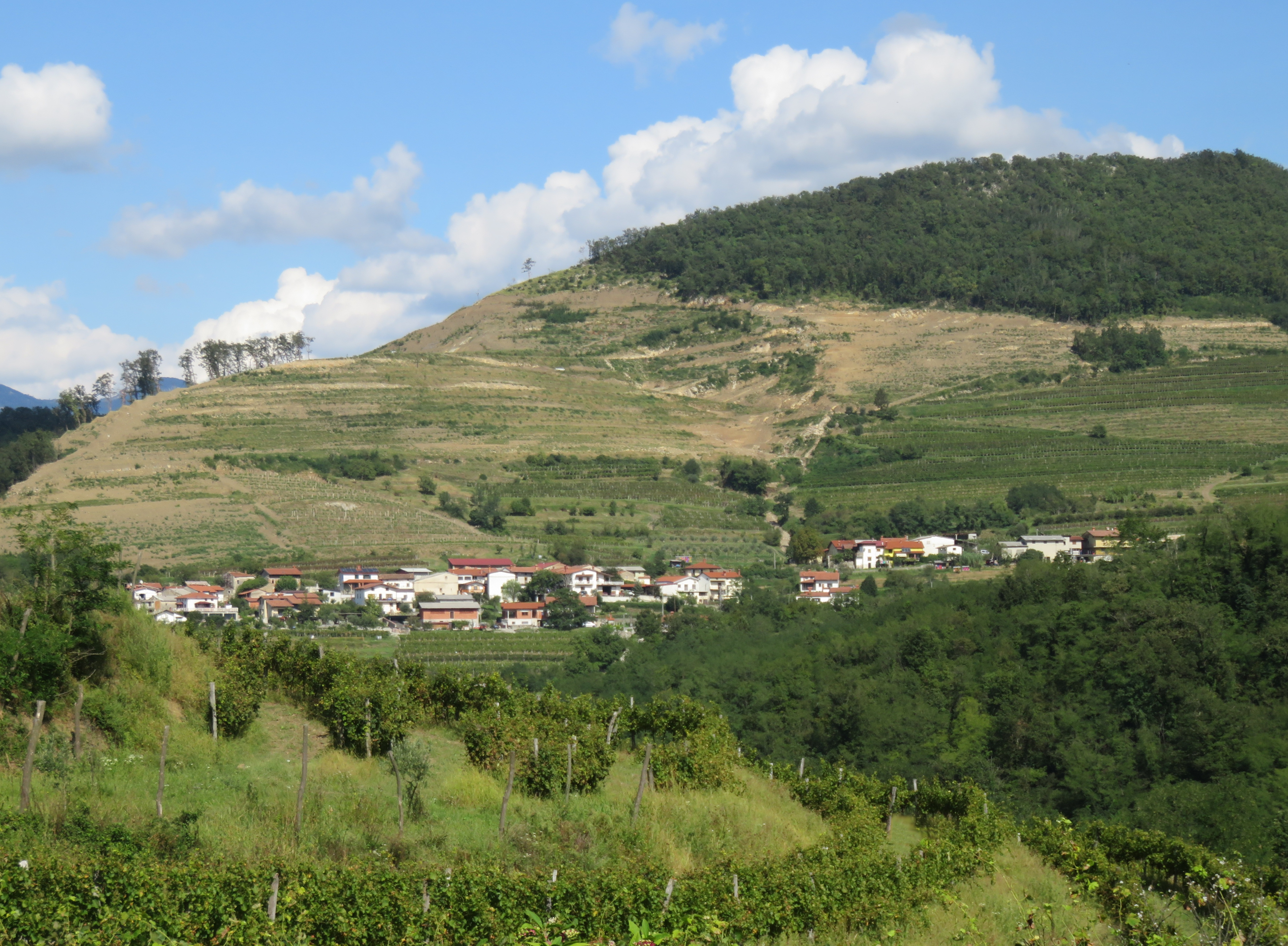

- Location in Slovenia
- Coordinates: 45°51′12.7″N 13°50′5.15″E
- Country: Slovenia
- Traditional region: Littoral
- Statistical region: Gorizia
- Municipality: Ajdovščina

Area
  - Total: 2.1 km^{2} (0.81 sq mi)
- Elevation: 167.1 m (548 ft)

Population (2020)
  - Total: 84
  - Density: 40/km^{2} (100/sq mi)

Zavino (pronounced [zaˈʋiːnɔ]) is a small village in the hills south of the Vipava Valley in the Municipality of Ajdovščina in the Littoral region of Slovenia.

== Name ==
Zavino was first attested in written sources in 1763–87 as Svina. The name is derived from *Svinjino (selo)—literally, 'pig (village)'—indicating that the people of the village raised pigs. The form Zavino was an artificial modification of the name to avoid the association with pigs, but the original root is still preserved in the name of Svinjšček Creek, which runs west of the village. Local variations of the village name include Svinino, Svinno, and (dissimilated) Svilno. See also Sinja Gorica, Svino, and Vinje pri Moravčah for similar names. The name was changed from Svino to Zavino in 1952.
