= Vinje Glacier =

Glacier in Antarctica

- Location of Queen Maud Land in Antarctica

- Location within Antarctica
- Location: Queen Maud Land
- Coordinates: 71°55′S 08°00′E
- Length: 20 nmi (37 km; 23 mi)
- Thickness: unknown
- Terminus: Filchner Mountains
- Status: unknown

Vinje Glacier is a broad glacier about 20 nautical miles (37 km) long flowing northwest between the Filchner Mountains and Fenriskjeften Mountain in Queen Maud Land. Mapped by Norwegian cartographers from surveys and air photos by the Norwegian Antarctic Expedition (1956–60) and named for T. Vinje, meteorologist with Norwegian Antarctic Expedition (1956–58).

== See also ==
- List of glaciers in the Antarctic
- Glaciology
