= Vasslivatnet =

Lake in Trøndelag, Norway

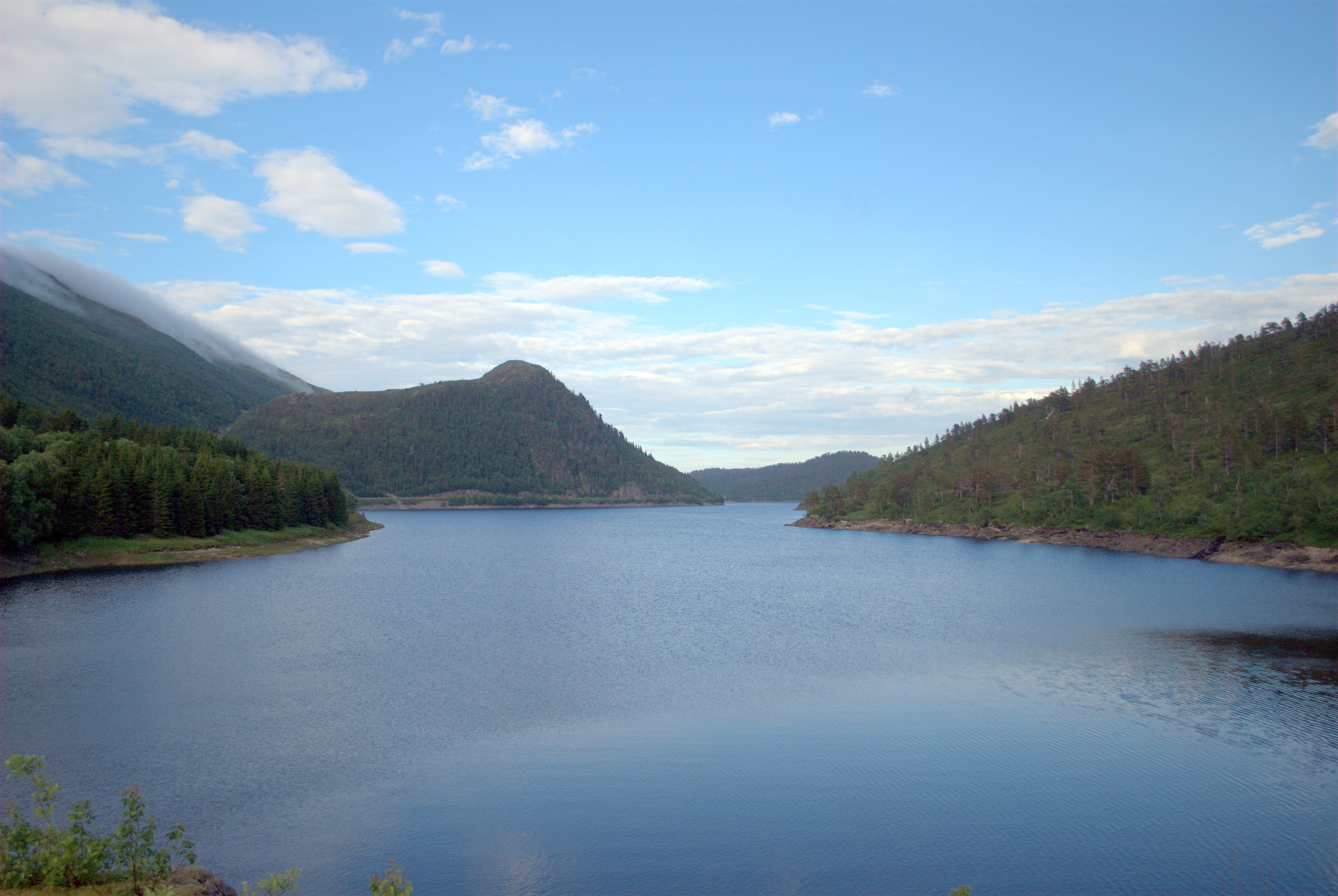
- Interactive map of the lake
- Location: Heim Municipality, Trøndelag
- Coordinates: 63°12′41″N 09°16′46″E
- Primary inflows: Søvatnet lake
- Primary outflows: Søo river
- Basin countries: Norway
- Max. length: 2.5 kilometres (1.6 mi)
- Max. width: 1.5 kilometres (0.93 mi)
- Surface area: 2.92 km^{2} (1.13 sq mi)
- Shore length^{1}: 12.5 kilometres (7.8 mi)
- Surface elevation: 280 metres (920 ft)
- References: NVE
- ^{1} Shore length is not a well-defined measure.

Vasslivatnet (English: Lake Vassli) is a lake in Heim Municipality in Trøndelag county, Norway. The 2.92-square-kilometre (1.13 sq mi) lake lies along European route E39, about 13 kilometres (8.1 mi) east of the village of Vinjeøra. The lake is a man-made lake along the river Søo. There is a dam on the west end that is part of a hydropower plant.

== See also ==
- List of lakes in Norway
