= Svino =

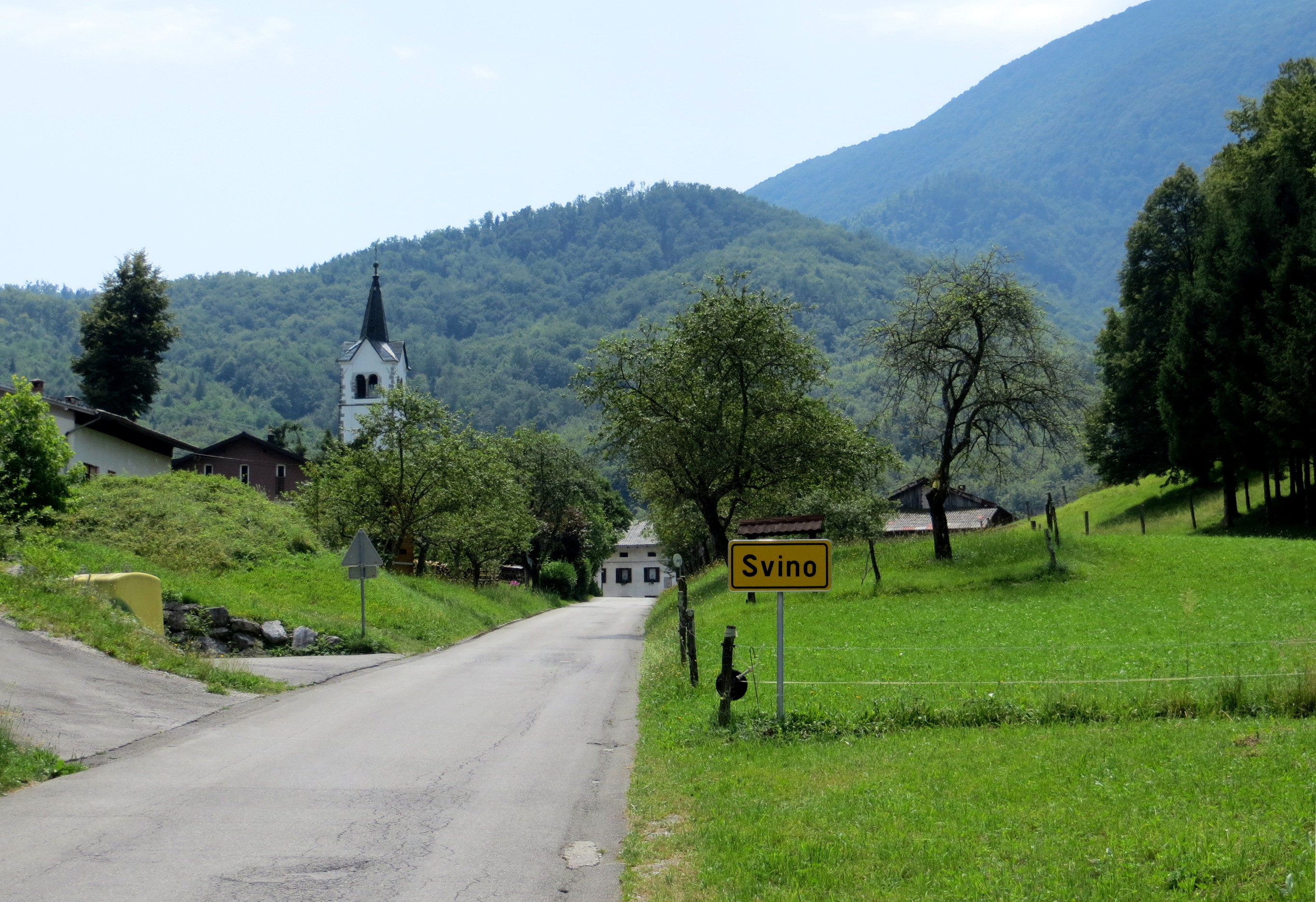

- Location in Slovenia
- Coordinates: 46°14′23.64″N 13°33′58.48″E
- Country: Slovenia
- Traditional region: Slovenian Littoral
- Statistical region: Gorizia
- Municipality: Kobarid

Area
  - Total: 4.1 km^{2} (1.6 sq mi)
- Elevation: 284.8 m (934 ft)

Population (2002)
  - Total: 85

Svino (pronounced [ˈsʋiːnɔ]) is a small village near Kobarid in the Littoral region of Slovenia. The church in the village is dedicated to Saint Andrew. It is a small Gothic building with a star vaulted sanctuary.

== Name ==
Svino was first attested in written sources in 1321 as Sfigna (and as Sfina in 1351). The name is derived from *Svinьno (selo/poľe)—literally, 'pig (village/field)'—indicating that the villagers originally raised pigs. See also Sinja Gorica, Vinje pri Moravčah, and Zavino for similar names.

== Geography ==
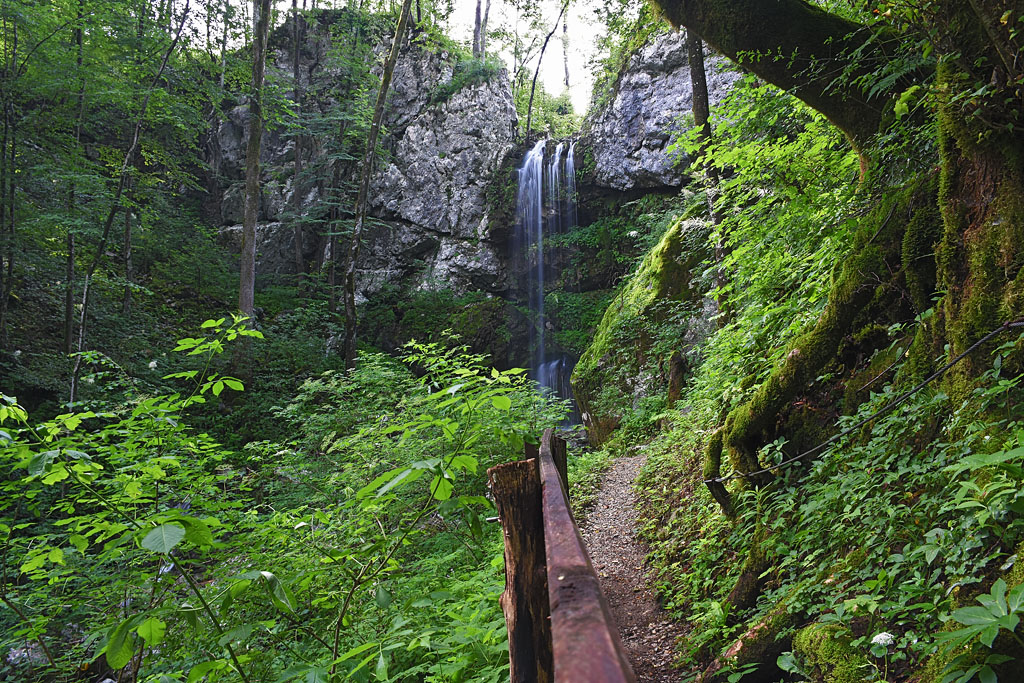
Svino Falls

Svino stands on a terrace above the Idrija River. Svino Falls (Slovene: slap Svino) is located about 325 meters (1,066 ft) northeast of the village center on a small tributary of the Idrija River.
