= Sinja Gorica =

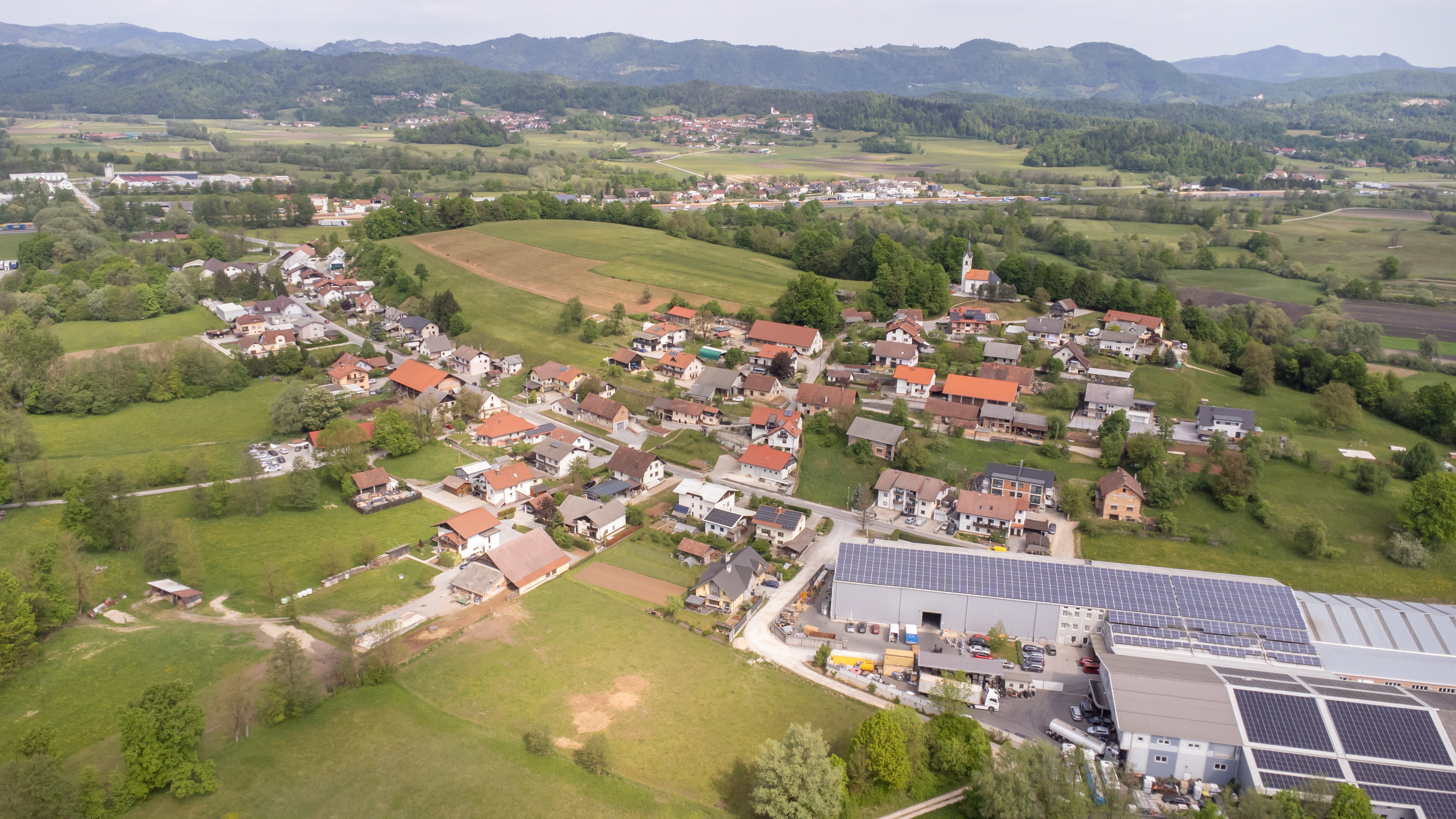

- Location in Slovenia
- Coordinates: 45°58′48.96″N 14°19′16.99″E
- Country: Slovenia
- Traditional region: Inner Carniola
- Statistical region: Central Slovenia
- Municipality: Vrhnika

Area
  - Total: 2.28 km^{2} (0.88 sq mi)
- Elevation: 289.3 m (949 ft)

Population (2002)
  - Total: 479

Sinja Gorica (pronounced [ˈsiːnja ɡɔˈɾiːtsa]; German: Schweinbüchl or Schweinsbüchel, later Scheinbüchel) is a settlement immediately northwest of Vrhnika in the Inner Carniola region of Slovenia. The settlement consists of two parts: the older part stands to the southeast, built around the foot of a hill and along the road to Blatna Brezovica. The newer part, the hamlet of Sap, stands along the main road from Vrhnika to Ljubljana.

== Name ==
Sinja Gorica was first mentioned in written sources in 1414 under the German name Sweinpuhel (literally, 'pig hill'), and as Sweinpůhel in 1418, Singa goriza in 1474, and Sweinpuhl in 1496. Based on the oldest attestations of the name, it is likely that the Slovene name is derived from the adjective *svinь(jь) 'pig' and that the name may have referred to a hill where pigs foraged. A less likely theory is that the German name was a mistranslation of the Slovene adjective sinji 'light blue', referring to pigmentation of the soil. The settlement was known as Schweinbüchl in the past in German. See also Svino, Vinje pri Moravčah, and Zavino for similar names.

== Church ==
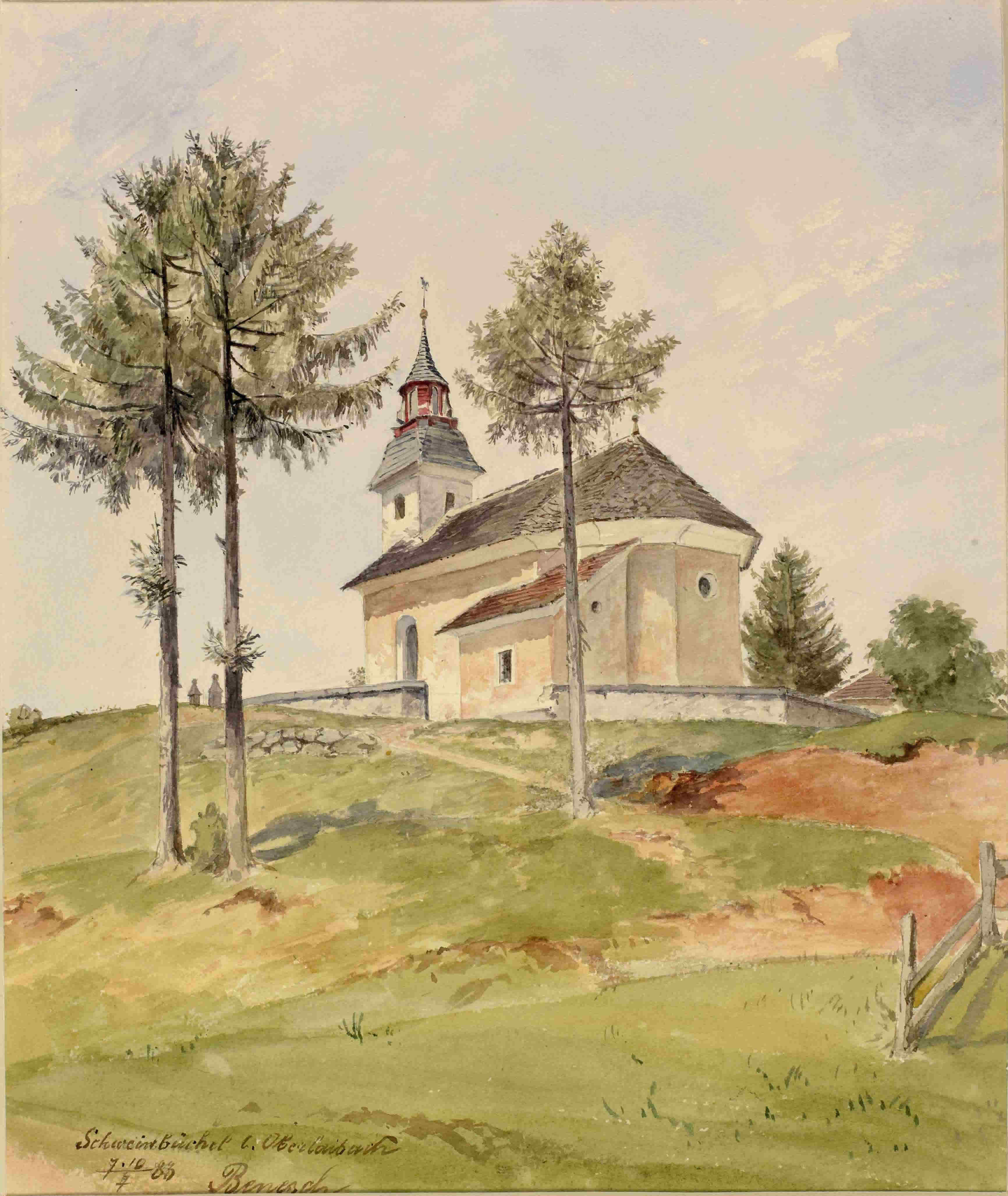
Painting by Ladislav Benesch, 1883

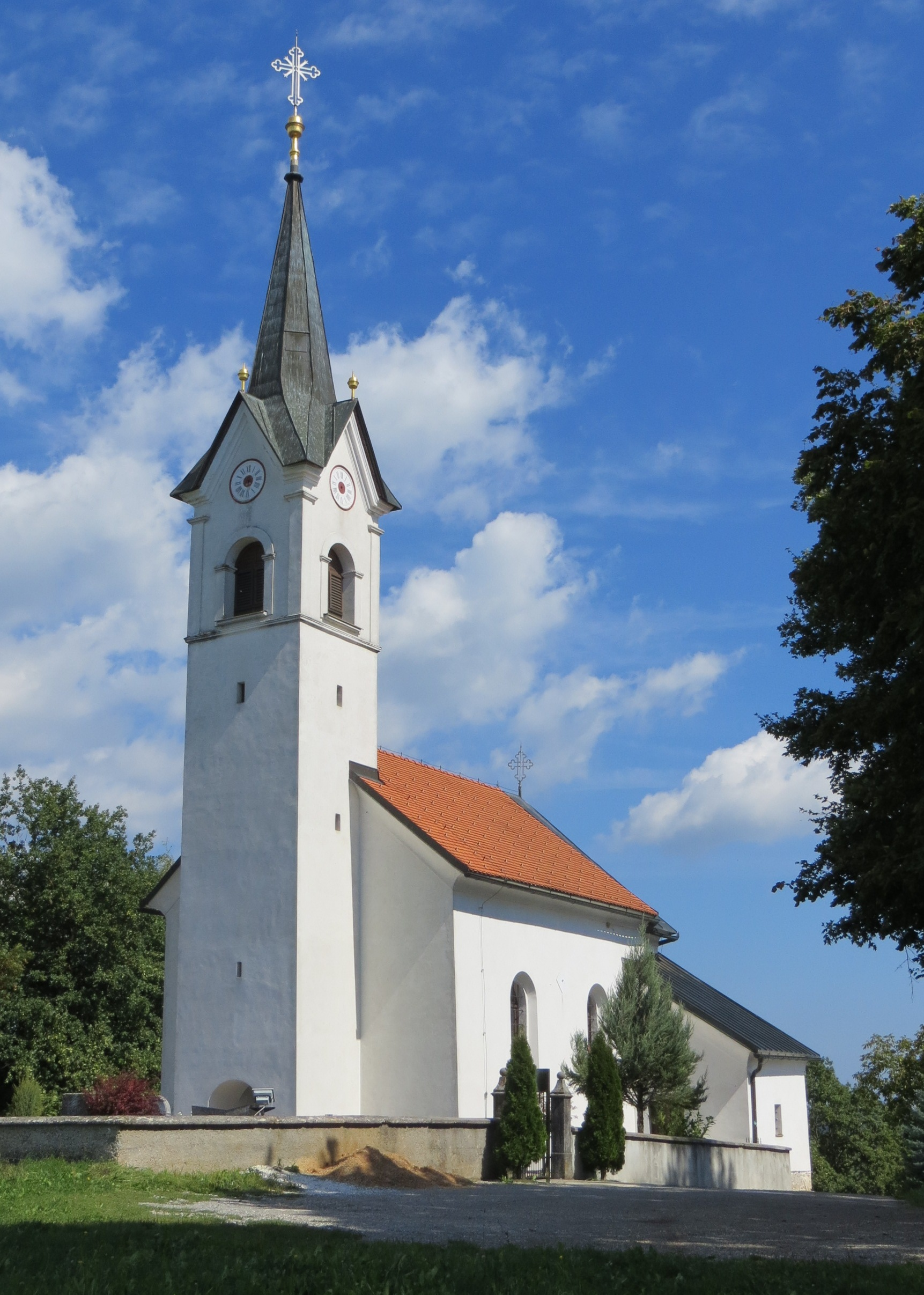
View from west

Prophet Job Church

The local church in the settlement is dedicated to the Prophet Job and belongs to the Parish of Vrhnika. The church was first mentioned in written sources in 1521 and was renovated in 1821.
