= Vinje Church, Trøndelag =

Church in Trøndelag, Norway

Vinje Church
- Vinje kirke
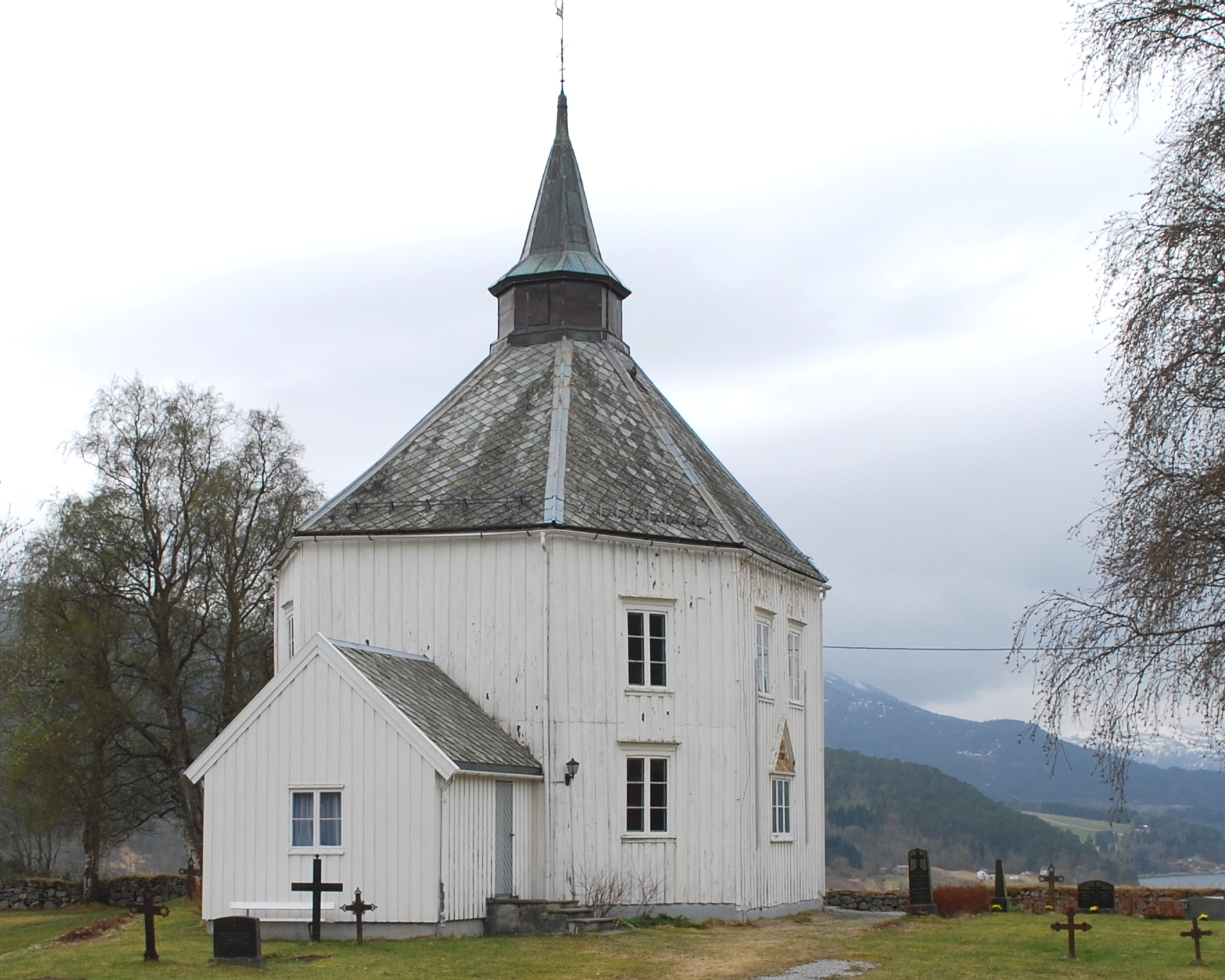
- View of the church
- Vinje Church
- 63.206898392°N 08.996961861°E
- Location: Heim Municipality, Trøndelag
- Country: Norway
- Denomination: Church of Norway
- Churchmanship: Evangelical Lutheran

History
- Status: Parish church
- Founded: 12th century
- Consecrated: 1821

Architecture
- Functional status: Active
- Architect: P. Konstum
- Architectural type: Octagonal
- Completed: 1821 (205 years ago)

Specifications
- Capacity: 200
- Materials: Wood

Administration
- Diocese: Nidaros bispedømme
- Deanery: Orkdal prosti
- Parish: Vinje
- Norwegian Cultural Heritage Site
- Type: Church
- Status: Automatically protected
- ID: 85855

Vinje Church (Norwegian: Vinje kirke) is a parish church of the Church of Norway in Heim Municipality in Trøndelag county, Norway. It is located in the village of Vinjeøra, just north of the European route E39 highway. It is the church for the Vinje parish which is part of the Orkdal prosti (deanery) in the Diocese of Nidaros. The white, wooden church was built in an octagonal style in 1821 using plans drawn up by the architect P. Konstum. The church seats about 200 people (150 on the main floor and 50 more in the balcony).

== History ==
The earliest existing historical records of the church date back to the year 1432, but the church was built long before that time. The church has a crucifix that is dated to the early 12th century, so that is likely the date the first church in Vinje was established. Not much is known about the medieval building, but in 1675, the old church was torn down because the building was in such poor condition. A new log long church was built on the same site soon after.

In an inspection report from 1819, it was pointed out that the church had fallen into disrepair and that a new church needed to be built. The church was torn down in 1821 and a new timber-framed church was built on a site in the cemetery about 10 metres (33 ft) north of the old church site. The new building had a slightly elongated octagonal floor plan with a sacristy extension on the east end and a church porch extension on the west end. The new building was consecrated in 1821.

== See also ==
- List of churches in Nidaros
