= Vinje pri Moravčah =

Vinje pri Moravčah Svinje (until 1955)
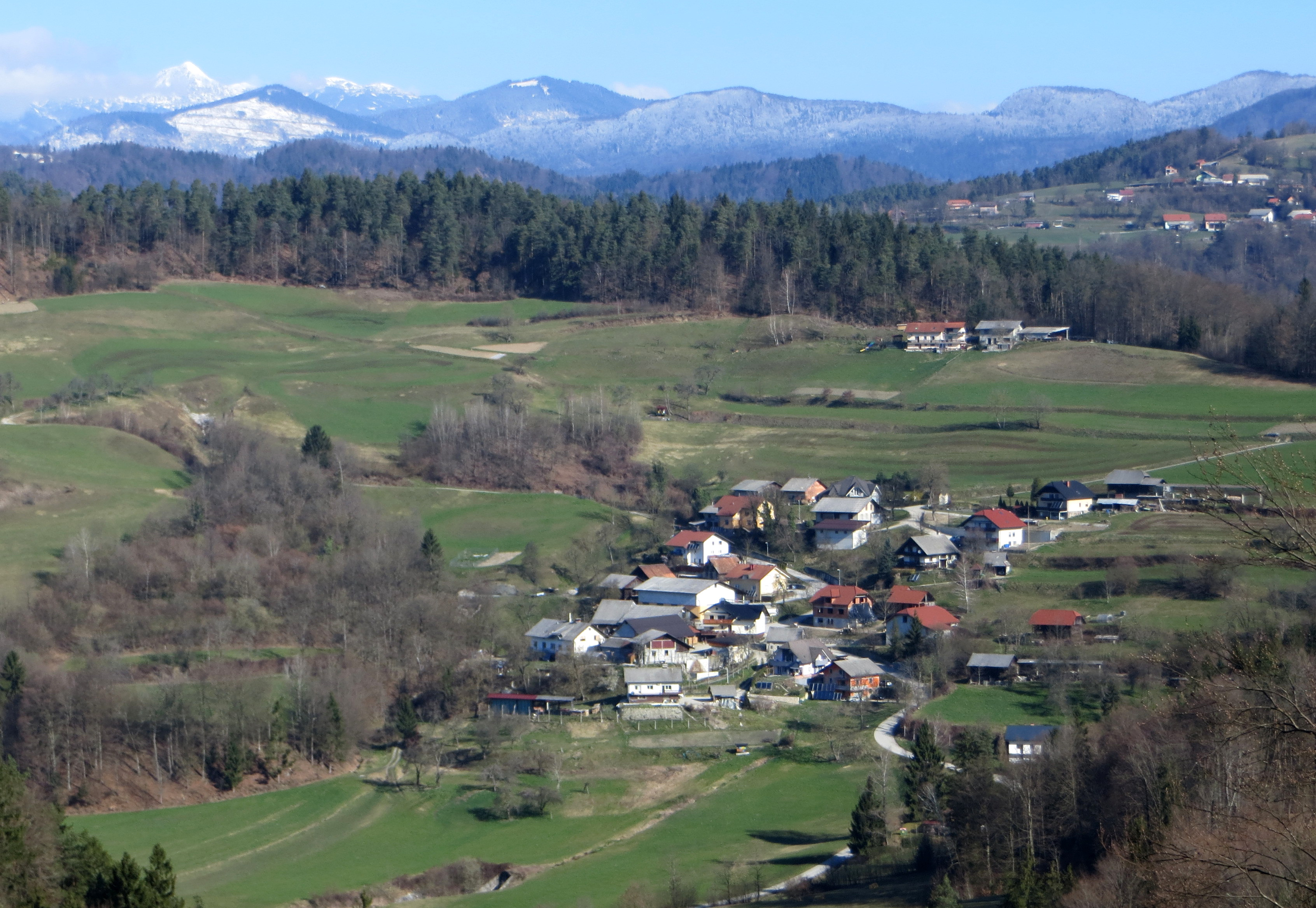

- Location in Slovenia
- Coordinates: 46°9′38.37″N 14°44′3.48″E
- Country: Slovenia
- Traditional region: Upper Carniola
- Statistical region: Central Slovenia
- Municipality: Moravče

Area
  - Total: 2.03 km^{2} (0.78 sq mi)
- Elevation: 394 m (1,293 ft)

Population (2002)
  - Total: 71
- Postal code: 1251

Vinje pri Moravčah (pronounced [ˈʋiːnjɛ pɾi mɔˈɾaːu̯tʃax]; German: Swine) is a small settlement in the Municipality of Moravče in central Slovenia. The area is part of the traditional region of Upper Carniola. It is now included with the rest of the municipality in the Central Slovenia Statistical Region. The settlement includes the hamlet of Rožek.

== Name ==
The Slovene name of the settlement was originally Svinje (sometimes Svine). The name was first attested in written sources in 1260 as Sweinz (and as Swinak in 1329, Zwinack in 1348, and Swein in 1439). The name Svinje is believed to derive from the Slovene common noun svinja 'pig', referring to the fact that pigs were raised in the settlement. An alternate theory suggests that the name was derived from So-vine 'group of vineyards'. The name was changed from Svinje to Vinje pri Moravčah (evoking 'wine') as an ameliorative semantic change in 1955. See also Sinja Gorica, Svino, and Zavino for similar names.

== History ==
The ruins of Rožek Castle are located in the hamlet of Rožek. Rožek was a separate village until it was annexed by Vinje pri Moravčah in 1952.
