= Halsa Municipality =

Former municipality in Møre og Romsdal, Norway

Halsa Municipality Halsa kommune
- Former municipality
- Halse herred (historic name)
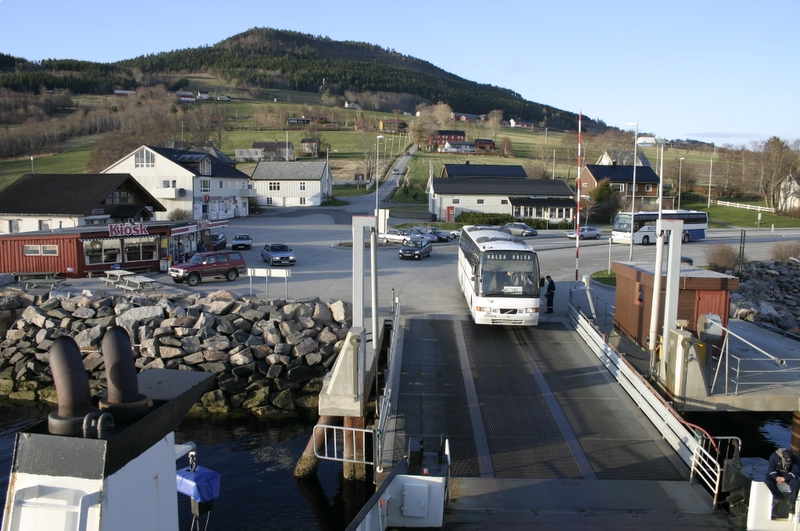
- Ferry quay in Halsanaustan

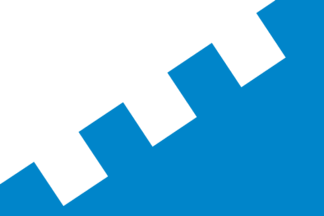
- Flag Coat of arms

- Møre og Romsdal within Norway

- Halsa within Møre og Romsdal
- Coordinates: 63°06′50″N 08°28′13″E
- Country: Norway
- County: Møre og Romsdal
- District: Nordmøre
- Established: 1 Jan 1838
  - Created as: Formannskapsdistrikt
- Disestablished: 1 Jan 2020
  - Succeeded by: Heim Municipality
- Administrative centre: Liabøen

Government
  - Mayor (2007-2019): Ola Rognskog (Sp)

Area (upon dissolution)
  - Total: 300.52 km^{2} (116.03 sq mi)
  - Land: 292.29 km^{2} (112.85 sq mi)
  - Water: 8.23 km^{2} (3.18 sq mi) 2.7%
  - Rank: #279 in Norway
- Highest elevation: 977.8 m (3,208 ft)

Population (2019)
  - Total: 1,574
  - Rank: #349 in Norway
  - Density: 5.2/km^{2} (13/sq mi)
  - Change (10 years): ▼ −4.4%
- Demonym: Halsabygg

Official language
  - Norwegian form: Neutral
- Time zone: UTC+01:00 (CET)
  - Summer (DST): UTC+02:00 (CEST)
- ISO 3166 code: NO-1571

Halsa is a former municipality in Møre og Romsdal county, Norway. The municipality existed from 1838 until 2020 when it became part of Heim Municipality in Trondelag county. It was part of the Nordmøre region. The administrative centre of Halsa was the village of Liabøen. Other villages in the municipality included Betna, Hennset, Klevset, Todalen, Halsa, Valsøyfjord, Engan, Hjellnes, and Valsøybotn.

Prior to its dissolution in 2020, the 301-square-kilometre (116 sq mi) municipality was the 279th largest by area out of the 422 municipalities in Norway. Halsa Municipality was the 349th most populous municipality in Norway with a population of 1,574. The municipality's population density was 5.2 inhabitants per square kilometre (13/sq mi) and its population has decreased by 4.4% over the previous 10-year period.

== General information ==
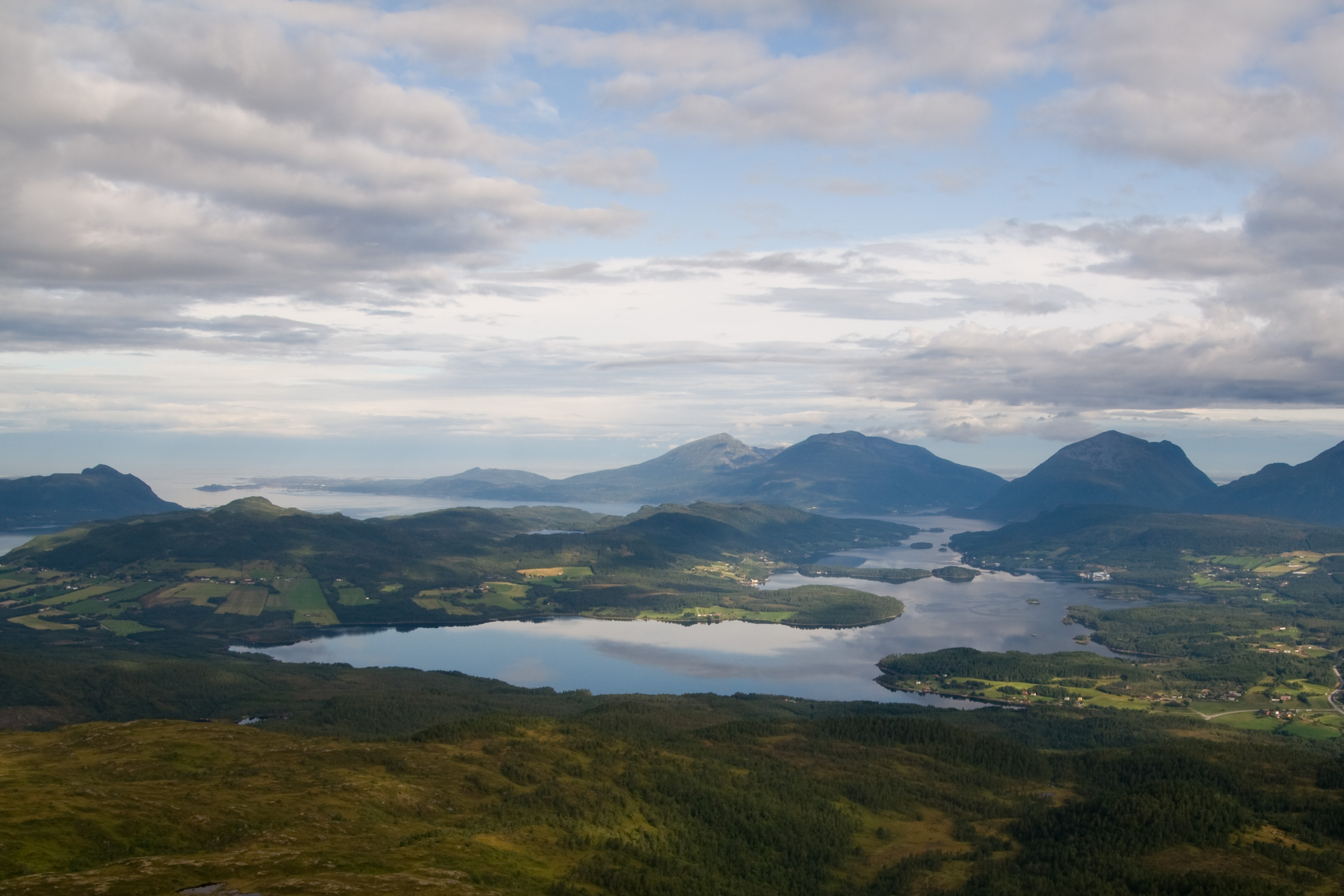
View of the Skålvik Fjord

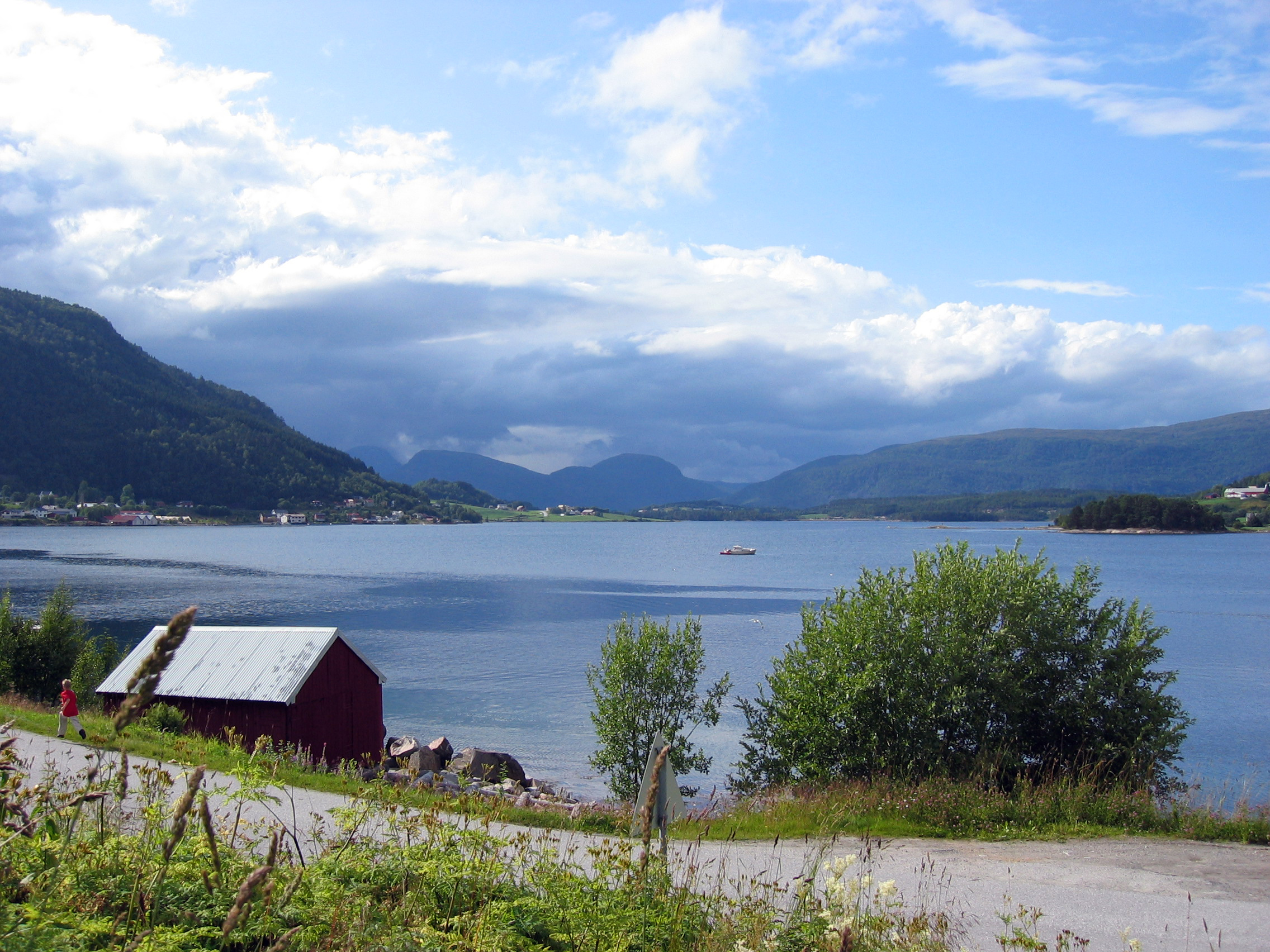
View of the Valsøyfjorden

The parish of Halsa was established as a municipality on 1 January 1838 (see formannskapsdistrikt law). On 1 January 1868, an unpopulated area of Halsa Municipality was transferred to the neighboring Straumsnes Municipality. On 1 January 1879, a part of Halsa Municipality (population: 279) was transferred to the neighboring Stangvik Municipality. The next year, the Torjulvågen area (population: 240) on the west side of the Halsafjorden was transferred to Tingvoll Municipality. On 1 July 1915, part of southern Halsa Municipality (population: 114) was transferred to Åsskard Municipality.

During the 1960s, there were many municipal mergers across Norway due to the work of the Schei Committee. On 1 January 1965, all of Valsøyfjord Municipality that was located on the mainland (population: 1,104) was merged into Halsa Municipality. On 1 January 1976, the district of Aure Municipality located south of the Vinjefjorden (population: 158) was transferred to Halsa Municipality.

On 1 January 2020, Halsa Municipality merged with the neighboring Hemne Municipality and the Ytre Snillfjord area of Snillfjord Municipality to form the new Heim Municipality. Heim Municipality is located in Trøndelag county, which means that as part of the merger, Halsa Municipality left Møre og Romsdal county and moved to Trøndelag county.

=== Name ===
The municipality (originally the parish) is named after the old Halsa farm (Old Norse: Hǫlsyinjar) since the first Halsa Church was built there. The first element comes from the plural form of the word hals which means "neck". Here, the word hals is referring to an isthmus (or neck of land) between two fjords: Halsafjorden and the Skålvikfjorden. The last element is vin which means "meadow" or "pasture". Historically, the name of the municipality was spelled Halse. On 3 November 1917, a royal resolution changed the spelling of the name of the municipality to Halsa.

=== Coat of arms ===
The coat of arms was granted on 19 August 1988 and it was in use until 2020 when the municipality ceased to exist. The official blazon is "Per bend sinister embattled argent and azure" (Norwegian: Venstre skrådelt av sølv og blått ved tindesnitt). This means the arms have are divided with a diagonal line that is embattled. The field (background) below the line has a tincture of azure. Above the line, the field has a tincture of argent which means it is commonly colored white, but if it is made out of metal, then silver is used. The embattled line symbolizes the municipal coastline since there are three fjords (Halsafjorden, Skålvikfjorden and Valsøyfjorden) protruding inland from the north coast of the municipality. The arms were designed by Asbjørn Heggem. The municipal flag has the same design as the coat of arms.

=== Churches ===
The Church of Norway had two parishes (sokn) within Halsa Municipality. It was part of the Indre Nordmøre prosti (deanery) in the Diocese of Møre.

Churches in Halsa Municipality
Parish (sokn)	Church name	Location of the church	Year built
Halsa	Halsa Church	Halsa	1734
Valsøyfjord	Valsøyfjord Church	Valsøyfjord	1864

== Geography ==
Halsa Municipality had numerous fjords in and around the municipality including the Halsafjorden, Vinjefjorden, Arasvikfjorden, Skålvikfjorden, and Valsøyfjorden. The Valsøy Bridge crossed the Valsøyfjorden. There were ferry connections to Tingvoll Municipality to the west and to Aure Municipality to the north. The highest point in the municipality was the 977.8-metre (3,208 ft) tall mountain Hjelmen.

== Government ==
While it existed, Halsa Municipality was responsible for primary education (through 10th grade), outpatient health services, senior citizen services, welfare and other social services, zoning, economic development, and municipal roads and utilities. The municipality was governed by a municipal council of directly elected representatives. The mayor was indirectly elected by a vote of the municipal council. The municipality was under the jurisdiction of the Nordmøre District Court and the Frostating Court of Appeal. Waste management was provided by the inter-municipal agency Nordmøre Interkommunale Renovasjonsselskap.

=== Municipal council ===
The municipal council (Kommunestyre) of Halsa is made up of 15 representatives that are elected to four year terms. The tables below show the historical composition of the council by political party.

Halsa kommunestyre 2015–2019
Party name (in Norwegian)	Number of representatives
Labour Party (Arbeiderpartiet)	3
Conservative Party (Høyre)	2
Centre Party (Senterpartiet)	10
Total number of members:	15

Halsa kommunestyre 2011–2015
Party name (in Norwegian)	Number of representatives
Labour Party (Arbeiderpartiet)	3
Progress Party (Fremskrittspartiet)	1
Conservative Party (Høyre)	2
Centre Party (Senterpartiet)	6
Cross-party local list (Tverrpolitisk bygdeliste)	3
Total number of members:	15

Halsa kommunestyre 2007–2011
Party name (in Norwegian)	Number of representatives
Labour Party (Arbeiderpartiet)	4
Progress Party (Fremskrittspartiet)	2
Conservative Party (Høyre)	1
Centre Party (Senterpartiet)	5
Cross-party local list (Tverrpolitisk bygdeliste)	3
Total number of members:	15

Halsa kommunestyre 2003–2007
Party name (in Norwegian)	Number of representatives
Labour Party (Arbeiderpartiet)	3
Conservative Party (Høyre)	3
Centre Party (Senterpartiet)	5
Cross-party local list (Tverrpolitisk bygdeliste)	4
Total number of members:	15

Halsa kommunestyre 1999–2003
Party name (in Norwegian)	Number of representatives
Labour Party (Arbeiderpartiet)	6
Conservative Party (Høyre)	3
Centre Party (Senterpartiet)	6
Cross-party local list (Tverrpolitisk bygdeliste)	6
Total number of members:	21

Halsa kommunestyre 1995–1999
Party name (in Norwegian)	Number of representatives
Labour Party (Arbeiderpartiet)	6
Conservative Party (Høyre)	3
Centre Party (Senterpartiet)	9
Liberal Party (Venstre)	3
Total number of members:	21

Halsa kommunestyre 1991–1995
Party name (in Norwegian)	Number of representatives
Labour Party (Arbeiderpartiet)	8
Conservative Party (Høyre)	2
Christian Democratic Party (Kristelig Folkeparti)	1
Centre Party (Senterpartiet)	9
Liberal Party (Venstre)	1
Total number of members:	21

Halsa kommunestyre 1987–1991
Party name (in Norwegian)	Number of representatives
Labour Party (Arbeiderpartiet)	9
Conservative Party (Høyre)	4
Christian Democratic Party (Kristelig Folkeparti)	1
Centre Party (Senterpartiet)	5
Liberal Party (Venstre)	2
Total number of members:	21

Halsa kommunestyre 1983–1987
Party name (in Norwegian)	Number of representatives
Labour Party (Arbeiderpartiet)	8
Conservative Party (Høyre)	3
Christian Democratic Party (Kristelig Folkeparti)	2
Centre Party (Senterpartiet)	4
Liberal Party (Venstre)	2
Valsøyfjord free list (Valsøyfjord Friliste)	2
Total number of members:	21

Halsa kommunestyre 1979–1983
Party name (in Norwegian)	Number of representatives
Labour Party (Arbeiderpartiet)	7
Conservative Party (Høyre)	3
Christian Democratic Party (Kristelig Folkeparti)	2
Centre Party (Senterpartiet)	4
Liberal Party (Venstre)	1
Valsøyfjord Free List (Valsøyfjord Friliste)	4
Total number of members:	21

Halsa kommunestyre 1975–1979
Party name (in Norwegian)	Number of representatives
Labour Party (Arbeiderpartiet)	9
Conservative Party (Høyre)	3
Christian Democratic Party (Kristelig Folkeparti)	1
Centre Party (Senterpartiet)	6
Liberal Party (Venstre)	2
Total number of members:	21

Halsa kommunestyre 1971–1975
Party name (in Norwegian)	Number of representatives
Labour Party (Arbeiderpartiet)	7
Conservative Party (Høyre)	2
Centre Party (Senterpartiet)	4
Local List(s) (Lokale lister)	8
Total number of members:	21

Halsa kommunestyre 1967–1971
Party name (in Norwegian)	Number of representatives
Labour Party (Arbeiderpartiet)	9
Conservative Party (Høyre)	3
Centre Party (Senterpartiet)	4
Local List(s) (Lokale lister)	5
Total number of members:	21

Halsa kommunestyre 1963–1967
Party name (in Norwegian)	Number of representatives
Labour Party (Arbeiderpartiet)	8
Conservative Party (Høyre)	3
Centre Party (Senterpartiet)	6
Total number of members:	17

Halsa herredsstyre 1959–1963
Party name (in Norwegian)	Number of representatives
Labour Party (Arbeiderpartiet)	8
Conservative Party (Høyre)	2
Centre Party (Senterpartiet)	5
Local List(s) (Lokale lister)	2
Total number of members:	17

Halsa herredsstyre 1955–1959
Party name (in Norwegian)	Number of representatives
Labour Party (Arbeiderpartiet)	7
Farmers' Party (Bondepartiet)	7
Joint List(s) of Non-Socialist Parties (Borgerlige Felleslister)	3
Total number of members:	17

Halsa herredsstyre 1951–1955
Party name (in Norwegian)	Number of representatives
Labour Party (Arbeiderpartiet)	6
Farmers' Party (Bondepartiet)	7
Joint List(s) of Non-Socialist Parties (Borgerlige Felleslister)	3
Total number of members:	16

Halsa herredsstyre 1947–1951
Party name (in Norwegian)	Number of representatives
Labour Party (Arbeiderpartiet)	6
Joint List(s) of Non-Socialist Parties (Borgerlige Felleslister)	8
Local List(s) (Lokale lister)	2
Total number of members:	16

Halsa herredsstyre 1945–1947
Party name (in Norwegian)	Number of representatives
Labour Party (Arbeiderpartiet)	7
Joint List(s) of Non-Socialist Parties (Borgerlige Felleslister)	9
Total number of members:	16

Halsa herredsstyre 1937–1941*
Party name (in Norwegian)	Number of representatives
Labour Party (Arbeiderpartiet)	4
Joint List(s) of Non-Socialist Parties (Borgerlige Felleslister)	12
Total number of members:	16
Note: Due to the German occupation of Norway during World War II, no elections were held for new municipal councils until after the war ended in 1945.

=== Mayors ===
The mayor (Norwegian: ordfører) of Halsa Municipality was the political leader of the municipality and the chairperson of the municipal council. Here is a list of people who held this position:

- 1838–1843: Bersven Røkkum
- 1844–1855: Peder Knudsen Wogland
- 1856–1857: Sivert Sogge
- 1858–1865: Nils T. Gjerstad
- 1866–1867: Sivert Sogge
- 1868–1871: Einar A. Megaard
- 1872–1873: Martinus Wogland
- 1874–1877: Einar A. Megaard
- 1878–1883: Nils T. Gjerstad
- 1884–1887: Knut P. Reiten (V)
- 1888–1889: Ole P. Sæter (MV)
- 1890–1893: Knut P. Reiten (V)
- 1894–1901: Tore N. Gjerstad (MV)
- 1902–1907: Edvard Gjerstad (V)
- 1908–1913: Nils Fjærvik
- 1914–1919: Tore N. Gjerstad (V)
- 1920–1922: Erik Oterholm (V)
- 1923–1925: Nils E. Aakvik (Bp)
- 1926–1928: Ole L. Taknes
- 1929–1931: Elling M. Rognskog (LL)
- 1932–1934: Tore J. Betten (LL)
- 1935–1937: Ole L. Taknes (LL)
- 1938–1942: Tore K. Reiten (LL)
- 1942–1945: Annas Strand (NS)
- 1945–1945: Tore K. Reiten (LL)
- 1946–1947: Ole L. Taknes (LL)
- 1948–1951: Einar Rosvold (LL)
- 1952–1959: Ingebrigt Fjærvik (Bp)
- 1960–1963: Nils Georg Hakstad (Ap)
- 1964–1964: Tore Seter (Sp)
- 1965–1971: Ragnar Lange (H)
- 1971–1975: Hallvard Enge (Sp)
- 1975–1979: Einar Snekvik (Ap)
- 1979–1983: Jan Aasland (KrF)
- 1983–1987: Einar Snekvik (Ap)
- 1987–1991: Erling Hammer (Ap)
- 1991–1999: Harald Nymoen (Sp)
- 1999–2003: Ivar Betten (Ap)
- 2003–2007: Margrete Seter (LL)
- 2007–2019: Ola Rognskog (Sp)

== Attractions ==
Halsa Municipality was the location where the famous killer whale, Keiko, went when he was set free. Keiko died in December 2003 and was buried there. The people of Halsa built a memorial cairn over Keiko's body, where people from all over the world are free to visit him. In the first year after his burial, around 5,000 people visited the grave but then fewer and fewer came and in 2007 only around 500 visitors paid him homage. In June 2008, hardly anyone had come to see the grave, so the municipality decided it would not continue keeping the grave in order.

== See also ==
- List of former municipalities of Norway
