= Norwegian County Road 350 =

Road in Trøndelag, Norway

County Road 350

Route information
- Length: 9.4 km (5.8 mi)

Major junctions
- South end: E39 at Åsletten, Heim Municipality
- North end: Korsneset, Heim Municipality

Location
- Country: Norway
- Counties: Trøndelag

Highway system
- Roads in Norway; National Roads; County Roads

County Road 350 (Norwegian: Fylkesvei 350) is a 9.4-kilometer (5.8 mi) road in Heim Municipality in Trøndelag county, Norway.

The road branches off from European route E39 at the Åsletten farm in the village of Halsa and runs a short distance north to Halsa Church, and then north-northeast until it nears Klevset on the shore of Skålvik Fjord. There it turns north-northwest and passes through Rabben and Setra before terminating at Korneset on the shore of Vinje Fjord, where a local road continues, circling around the Halsa Peninsula and eventually leading back to Halsa.

The county road and the smaller local road are also both named Halsavegen (lit. 'Halsa Road').
