= Nina Valsø =

Norwegian playwright

- Born: 8 March 1962; Halsa Municipality, Norway
- Died: 14 April 2002 (aged 40)
- Occupation: Playwright

Nina Valsø (8 March 1962 – 14 April 2002) was a Norwegian playwright.

Valsø was born in Halsa Municipality and grew up in Valsøyfjord. She moved to Trondheim when she started high school. In 1989 she received the European Broadcasting Union's prize for her television play Sjakk Matt (Checkmate). She debuted as a stage playwright in 1993 with the work Drømmen om Panama (The Dream of Panama), which is about wartime merchant seamen and their children. In addition to plays she also wrote documentary texts, poems, and lyrics.

== Selected works ==
- 1989: Sjakk Matt (Checkmate; television play)
- 1991: Jeg og mine roller (I and My Roles; written with Helga Wendelborg, premiered at Trøndelag Theater)
- 1993: Drømmen om Panama (The Dream of Panama)
- 1995: Ingen helgen (No Weekend; novel)
- 1995: Vi møtes igjen (We Meet Again; book about wartime merchant seamen)
- 1992: Kristin-spillet (The Kristin Game; performed at the Saint Olav's Days celebration in the summer of 1992 and three following summers)
- 1994: Little Girl Blue
- 1994: Det e' hardt å værra mainn (It's Hard to Be a Man; written with Iren Reppen)
- 1997: Author of the opening ceremonies at the dedication of the Trøndelag Theater's new buildings
- 2000: Writer of lyrics on the album Nattas prinsesse (artist: Iren Reppen)
- 2000: Ubuden gjest (Uninvited Guest)
- 2000: Rex Olavus (King Olav)

== Prizes and awards ==
- 1989: European Broadcasting Union prize for the television play Sjakk Matt (Checkmate)
- 2001: Ibsen Award for the play Ubuden gjest (Uninvited Guest)
- 2000: The Writers' Guild of Norway's Gledesglasset (Glass of Happiness) prize for Ubuden gjest (Uninvited Guest)
