= Valsøy Bridge =

Valsøy Bridge Valsøybrua
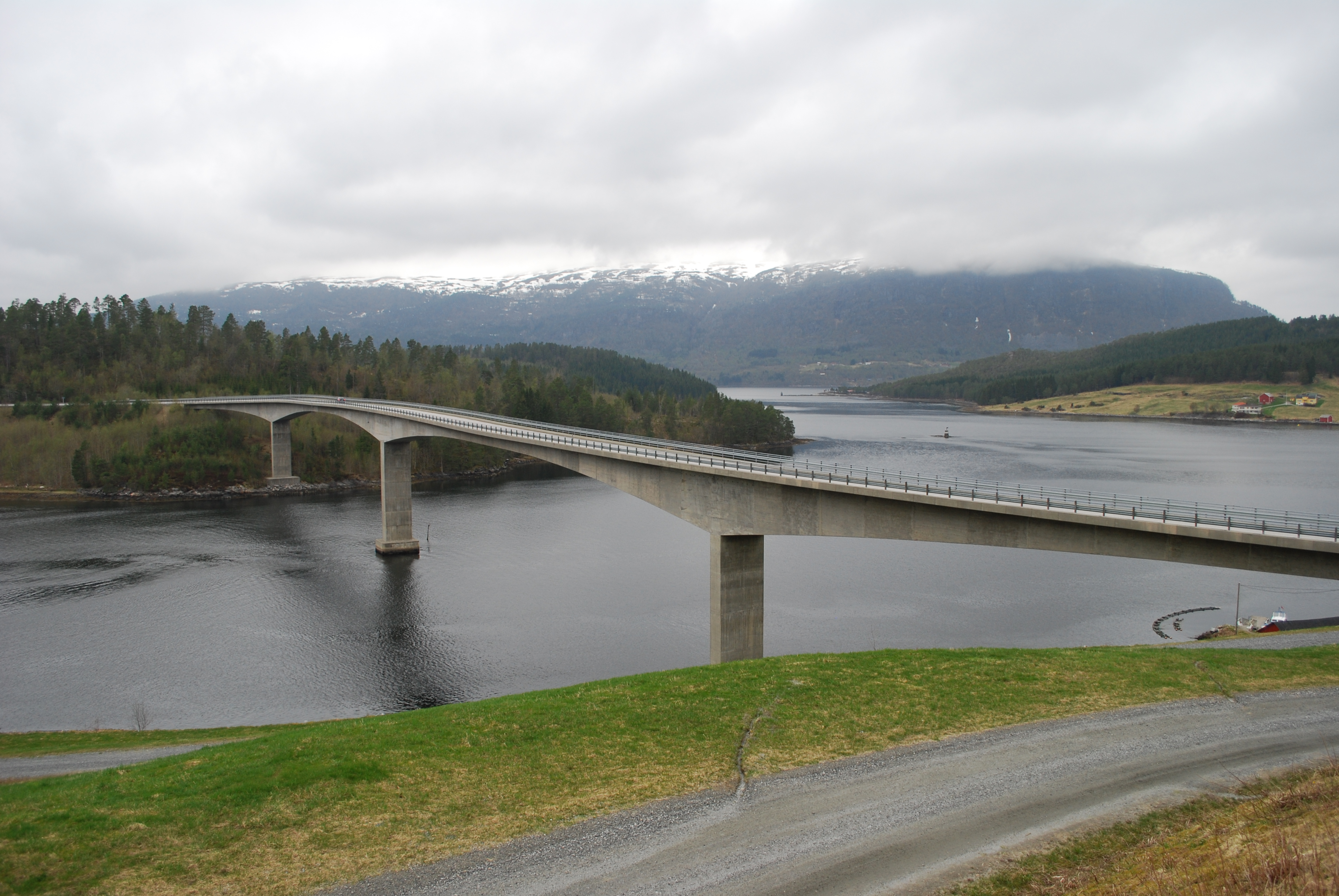
- Coordinates: 63°08′39″N 8°33′35″E
- Carries: E39
- Crosses: Valsøyfjorden
- Locale: Heim Municipality, Norway

Characteristics
- Total length: 360 metres (1,180 ft)

Location
- Interactive map of Valsøy Bridge

The Valsøy Bridge (Norwegian: Valsøybrua) is the longest of three spans that crosses parts of the Valsøyfjorden in Heim Municipality in Trøndelag county, Norway. The bridge, which opened in June 1993, connects the mainland of Heim to the west side of the island of Valsøya. The bridge lies about 4 kilometres (2.5 mi) east of the village of Valsøyfjord and about 15 kilometres (9.3 mi) east of the village of Liabøen.

== See also ==
- List of bridges in Norway
- List of bridges in Norway by length
