= Valsøybotn =

Village in Heim Municipality, Norway

- Village
- Interactive map of Valsøybotn
- Location within Trøndelag Location within Norway
- Coordinates: 63°05′39″N 08°36′56″E
- Country: Norway
- Region: Western Norway
- County: Trøndelag
- Municipality: Heim Municipality
- Elevation: 20 m (66 ft)
- Time zone: UTC+01:00 (CET)
  - Summer (DST): UTC+02:00 (CEST)
- Post Code: 6686 Valsøybotn

Valsøybotn is a village in Heim Municipality in Trøndelag county, Norway. The village is located at the end of the Valsøyfjorden, about 4 kilometres (2.5 mi) south of the village of Hjellnes and about 20 kilometres (12 mi) southeast of the village of Liabøen. The area was once part of Valsøyfjord Municipality and later it was part of Halsa Municipality before becoming part of Heim Municipality in 2020.
