= Nils Anton Vaagland =

Norwegian lawyer and politician

- Born: February 11, 1872; Halsa Municipality, Norway
- Died: December 29, 1965 (aged 93)
- Occupations: Lawyer, politician

Nils Anton Vaagland (February 11, 1872 – December 29, 1965) was a Norwegian lawyer and politician for the Liberal Party.

Vaagland was born in Halsa Municipality in Romsdalen county, Norway. He was the son of a schoolteacher and married the daughter of the school principal Ole Kristian Kuløy. After graduating from the school for non-commissioned officers in Trondheim in 1892, he received the certification examen artium in 1899 and candidate of law in 1905. Vaagland worked as a lawyer in Stjørdal Municipality from 1905 to 1925, as a judge on the Trondheim county court from 1925 to 1929, and as a magistrate on the Nordmøre county court from 1929 to 1943. Alongside his legal profession, he operated a farm in Stjørdal from 1913 to 1917 and started several industrial companies.

Vaagland served as the mayor of Stjørdal Municipality from 1911 to 1925. In 1908 he also provided the initiative for the Stjørdal Folk Academy, which he directed for 10 years. Other positions that he held include director of the Stjørdal electrical plant from 1913 to 1928, board member of the Østmarken Hospital from 1918 to 1928, director of the Halsa power association, and head of the Kristiansund Savings Bank's board of trustees from 1933 onward.
