= Betna =

Village in Heim Municipality, Norway

- Village
- Interactive map of Betna
- Location within Trøndelag Location within Norway
- Coordinates: 63°5′15.680″N 8°21′10.336″E
- Country: Norway
- Region: Western Norway
- County: Trøndelag
- Municipality: Heim Municipality
- Elevation: 40 m (130 ft)
- Time zone: UTC+01:00 (CET)
  - Summer (DST): UTC+02:00 (CEST)
- Post Code: 6683 Vågland

Betna is a village in Heim Municipality in Trøndelag county, Norway. It lies at the southeast end of the Skålvik Fjord (Skålvikfjorden), where the Betna River (Betnelva) empties into Betna Bay (Betnvågen). The village lies along the European route E39 highway, about 7 kilometres (4.3 mi) east of the village of Halsa.

The name Betna is derived from the verb beite which means 'to graze'.

The Blekken Elementary School is located in Betna. There used to be a convenience store in the settlement, but it went out of business in 2004. Traces of an Iron Age settlement were discovered in Betna during roadwork on the junction of European route E39 with County Road 65. The Museum of Natural History and Archaeology in Trondheim carried out archaeological investigations at the site in the summer of 2006.
