= Holla, Trøndelag =

Village in Heim Municipality, Norway

Holla
- Village
- Interactive map of Holla
- Location within Trøndelag Location within Norway
- Coordinates: 63.3105°N 09.1325°E
- Country: Norway
- Region: Central Norway
- County: Trøndelag
- District: Fosen
- Municipality: Heim Municipality
- Elevation: 24 m (79 ft)
- Time zone: UTC+01:00 (CET)
  - Summer (DST): UTC+02:00 (CEST)
- Post Code: 7200 Kyrksæterøra

Holla is a village in Heim Municipality in Trøndelag county, Norway. It is located along the south shore of the Hemnfjorden, about 5 kilometres (3.1 mi) northeast of the municipal center of Kyrksæterøra and about 10 kilometres (6.2 mi) southwest of the village of Ytre Snillfjord.
