= Klevset =

Village in Heim Municipality, Norway

Klevset Kløvset
- Village
- Interactive map of Klevset
- Location within Trøndelag Location within Norway
- Coordinates: 63°6′12″N 8°16′4″E
- Country: Norway
- Region: Western Norway
- County: Trøndelag
- Municipality: Heim Municipality
- Elevation: 37 m (121 ft)
- Time zone: UTC+01:00 (CET)
  - Summer (DST): UTC+02:00 (CEST)
- Post Code: 6680 Halsanaustan

Klevset is a village in Heim Municipality in Trøndelag county, Norway. It lies on the shore of Skålvik Fjord along County Road 350. The island of Bårsetøya lies just offshore in the fjord.

A small boatyard, J.M. Kleivset Båtbyggeri, formerly operated in Klevset. Among other vessels, it built three smacks for use by priests in the reconstruction of Finnmark after the Second World War.

The settlement was attested as Klauset in the 16th century and Kleffßett in 1590 (as well as Kleffset in 1667 and Klefset in 1723). The name is probably derived from the Old Norse word kleif which means 'cliff', referring to its location below a steep hill.
