= Liabøen =

Village in Heim Municipality, Norway

Liabøen Liabø
- Village
- Interactive map of Liabøen
- Location within Trøndelag Location within Norway
- Coordinates: 63°07′20″N 08°18′57″E
- Country: Norway
- Region: Western Norway
- County: Trøndelag
- Municipality: Heim Municipality

Area
  - Total: 0.33 km^{2} (0.13 sq mi)
- Elevation: 100 m (330 ft)

Population (2024)
  - Total: 206
  - Density: 624/km^{2} (1,620/sq mi)
- Time zone: UTC+01:00 (CET)
  - Summer (DST): UTC+02:00 (CEST)
- Post Code: 6683 Vågland

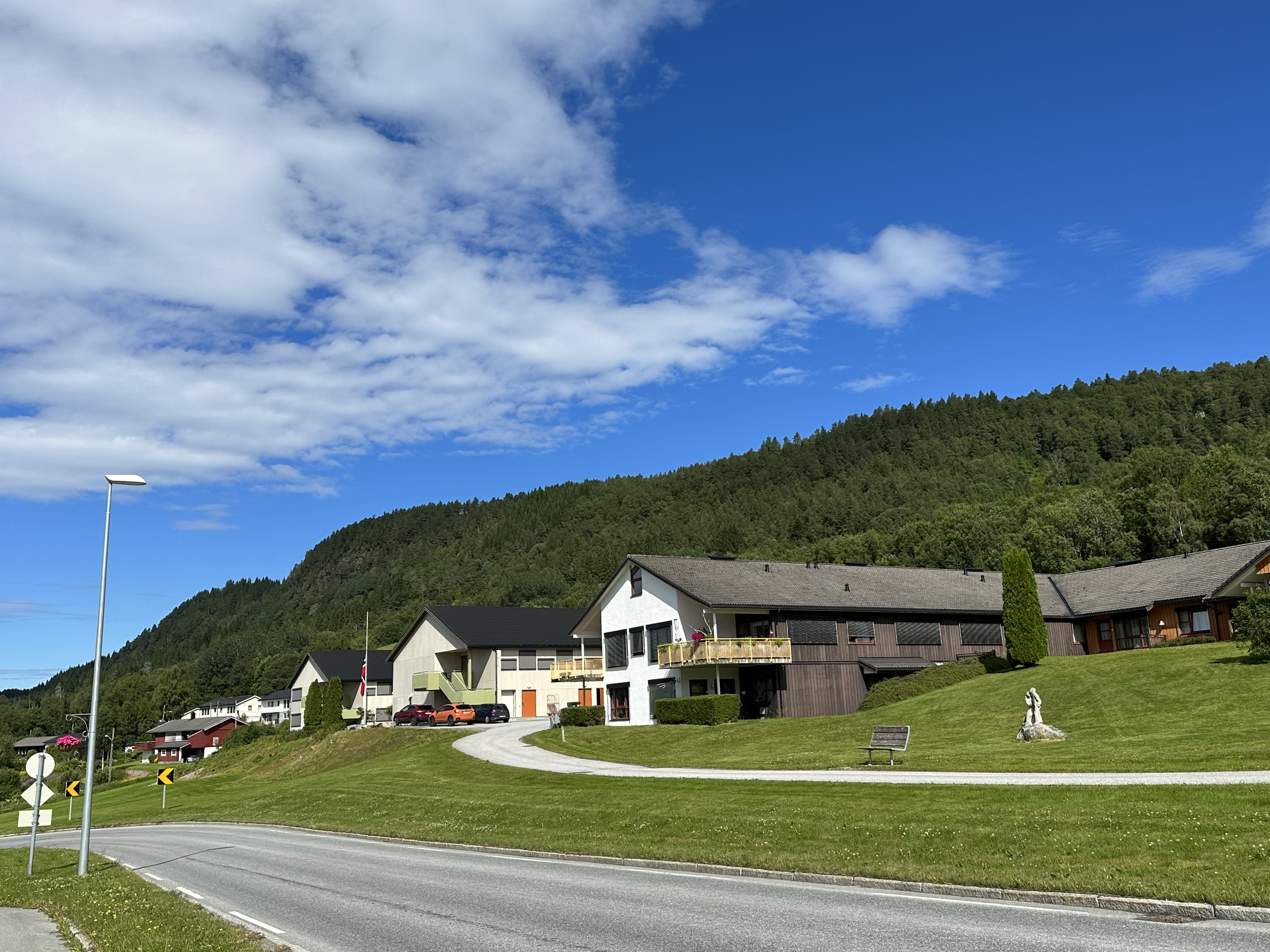
Heim Health Center, Liabøen village, Heim municipality

Liabøen (Statistics Norway calls it Liabø) is a village in Heim Municipality in Trøndelag county, Norway. The village is located along the Skålvik Fjord, along the European route E39 highway, about 10 kilometres (6.2 mi) northeast of the village of Halsa and about 10 kilometres (6.2 mi) west of the village of Valsøyfjord. Liabøen has a bank, store, cafe, and school.

The 0.33-square-kilometre (82-acre) village has a population (2024) of 206 and a population density of 624 inhabitants per square kilometre (1,620/sq mi).

Prior to 2020, the village was the administrative centre of the old Halsa Municipality.
