= Vinjefjorden =

Fjord in Møre og Romsdal and Trøndelag, Norway

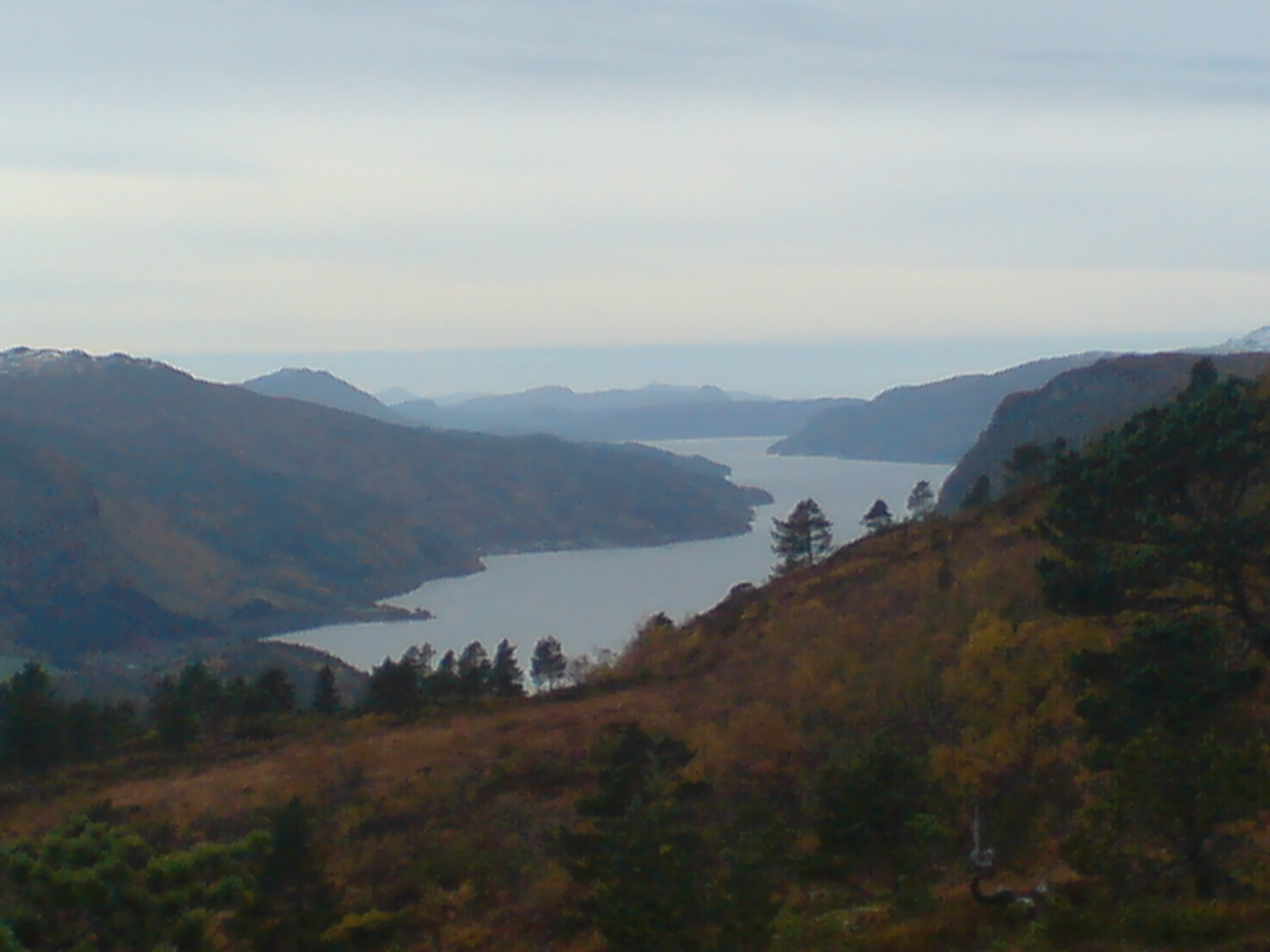
- View of the fjord
- Interactive map of the fjord
- Location: Trøndelag and Møre og Romsdal, Norway
- Coordinates: 63°11′23″N 8°44′15″E
- Type: Fjord
- Primary inflows: River Fjelna
- Primary outflows: Freifjorden, Talsjøen
- Basin countries: Norway
- Max. length: 53 kilometres (33 mi)
- Max. width: 6 kilometres (3.7 mi)
- Max. depth: 320 metres (1,050 ft)

Vinjefjorden (English: Vinje Fjord) is a fjord in Møre og Romsdal and Trøndelag counties in Norway. It begins at the village of Vinjeøra in Heim Municipality (in Trøndelag county) and flows west through the municipalities of Aure, Tingvoll, and Kristiansund (in Møre og Romsdal county). At its western end, it flows into the Talsjøen and Freifjorden. The Halsafjorden, Skålvik Fjord, and Valsøyfjorden all branch off of the 53-kilometre (33 mi) long Vinjefjorden. The central part of the Vinjefjorden is called the Arasvikfjorden. European route E39 runs along the southern shore of the fjord for most of its length.
