= Heim Municipality =

Municipality in Trøndelag, Norway

Heim Municipality Heim kommune
- Municipality
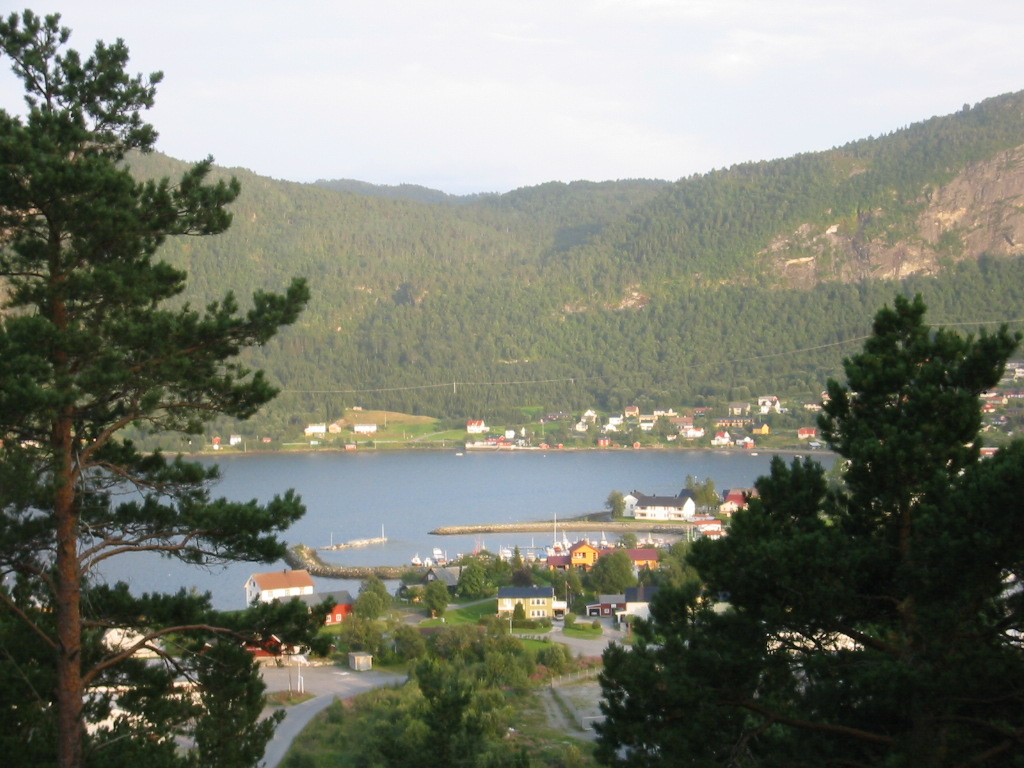
- View of the village of Kyrksæterøra

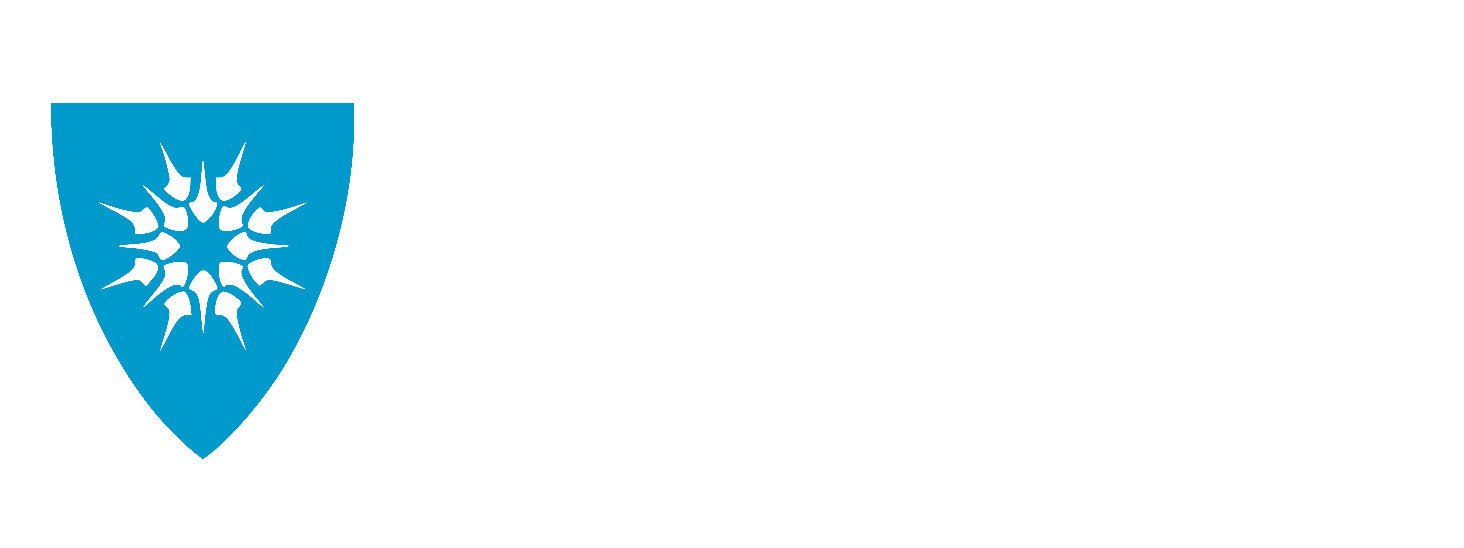
- Flag Coat of arms

- Trøndelag within Norway

- Heim within Trøndelag
- Coordinates: 63.2906°N 09.0891°E
- Country: Norway
- County: Trøndelag
- Established: 1 Jan 2020
  - Preceded by: Halsa Municipality, Hemne Municipality, and part of Snillfjord Municipality
- Administrative centre: Kyrksæterøra

Government
  - Mayor (2023): Marit Liabø Sandvik (Ap)

Area
  - Total: 1,024.55 km^{2} (395.58 sq mi)
  - Land: 980.35 km^{2} (378.52 sq mi)
  - Water: 44.20 km^{2} (17.07 sq mi) 4.3%
  - Rank: #113 in Norway
- Highest elevation: 1,039.96 m (3,411.9 ft)

Population (2024)
  - Total: 6,093
  - Rank: #161 in Norway
  - Density: 5.9/km^{2} (15/sq mi)
  - Change (10 years): ▲ +5%
- Demonym: Heimsbygg

Official language
  - Norwegian form: Neutral
- Time zone: UTC+01:00 (CET)
  - Summer (DST): UTC+02:00 (CEST)
- ISO 3166 code: NO-5055
- Website: Official website

Heim is a municipality in Trøndelag county, Norway. It was established on 1 January 2020 upon the merger of three other municipalities. It is located in the traditional district of Fosen. The administrative centre of the municipality is the village of Kyrksæterøra. Other villages in Heim include Betna, Engan, Halsa, Heim, Hellandsjøen, Hennset, Hjellnes, Holla, Klevset, Liabøen, Todalen, Valsøyfjord, Valsøybotn, Vinjeøra, and Ytre Snillfjord.

The 1,025-square-kilometre (396 sq mi) municipality is the 113th largest by area out of the 357 municipalities in Norway. Heim Municipality is the 161st most populous municipality in Norway with a population of 6,093. The municipality's population density is 5.9 inhabitants per square kilometre (15/sq mi) and its population has increased by 5% over the previous 10-year period.

== General information ==
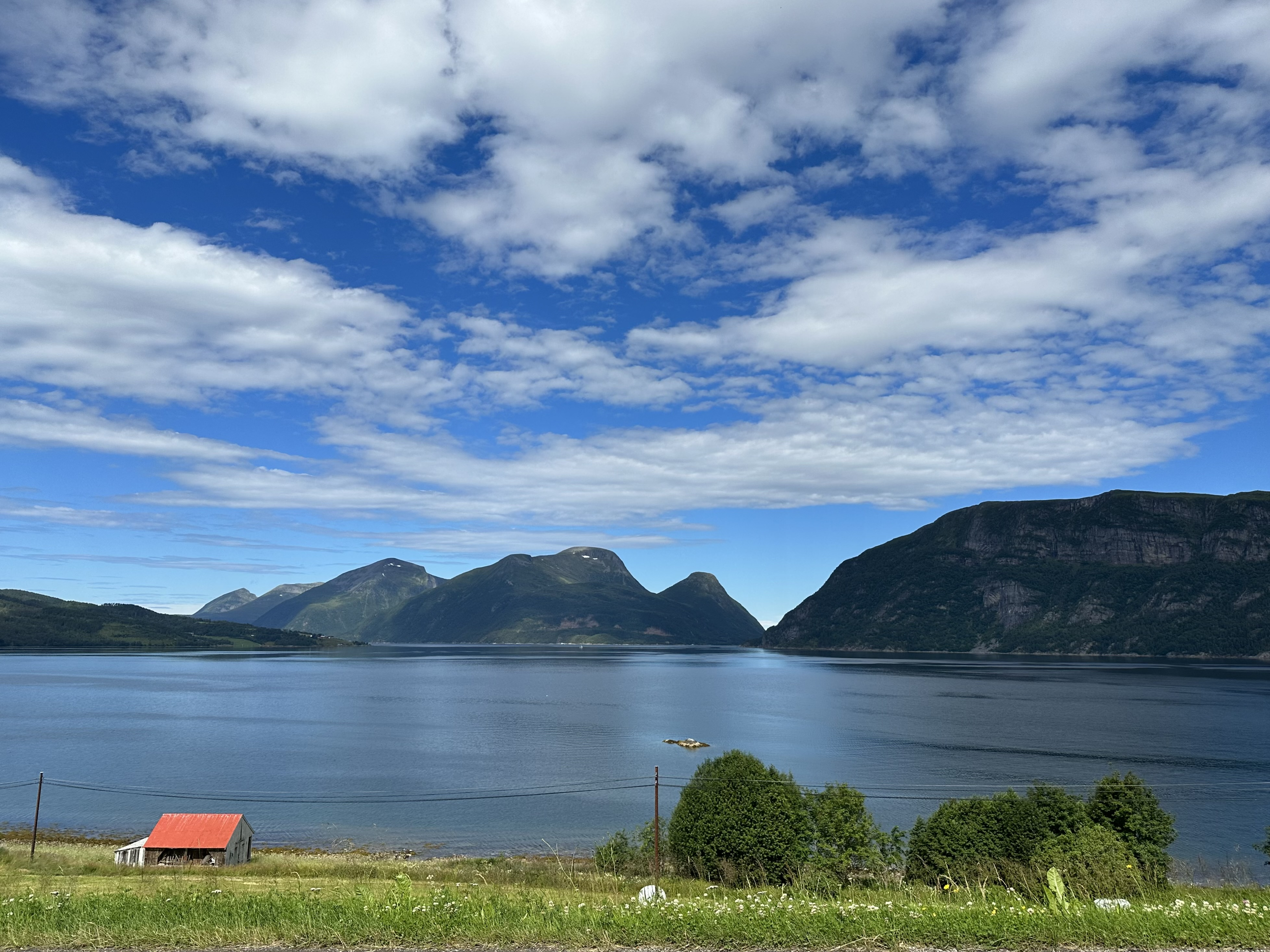
View of the Arasvikfjorden

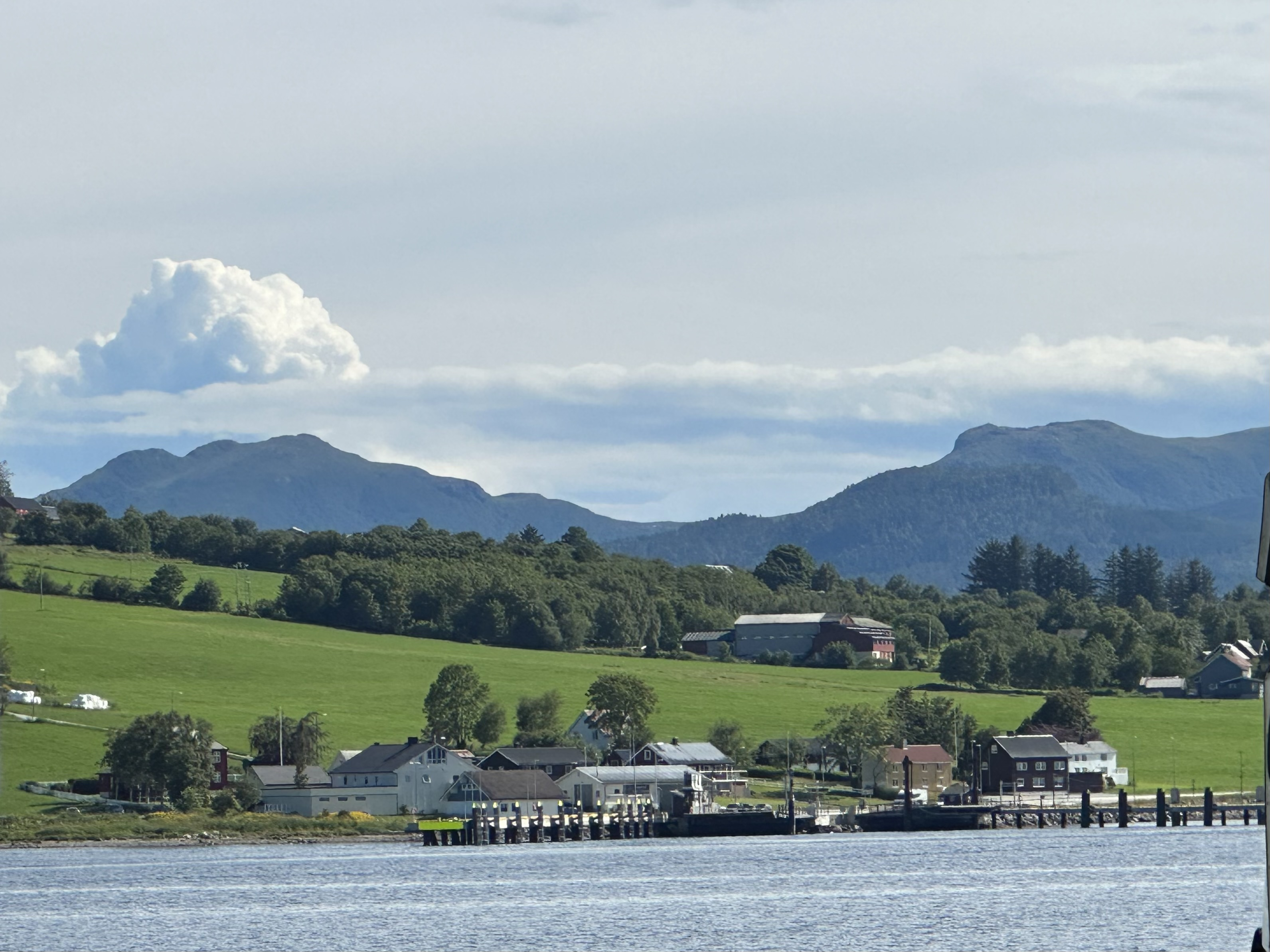
View of the Halsa area

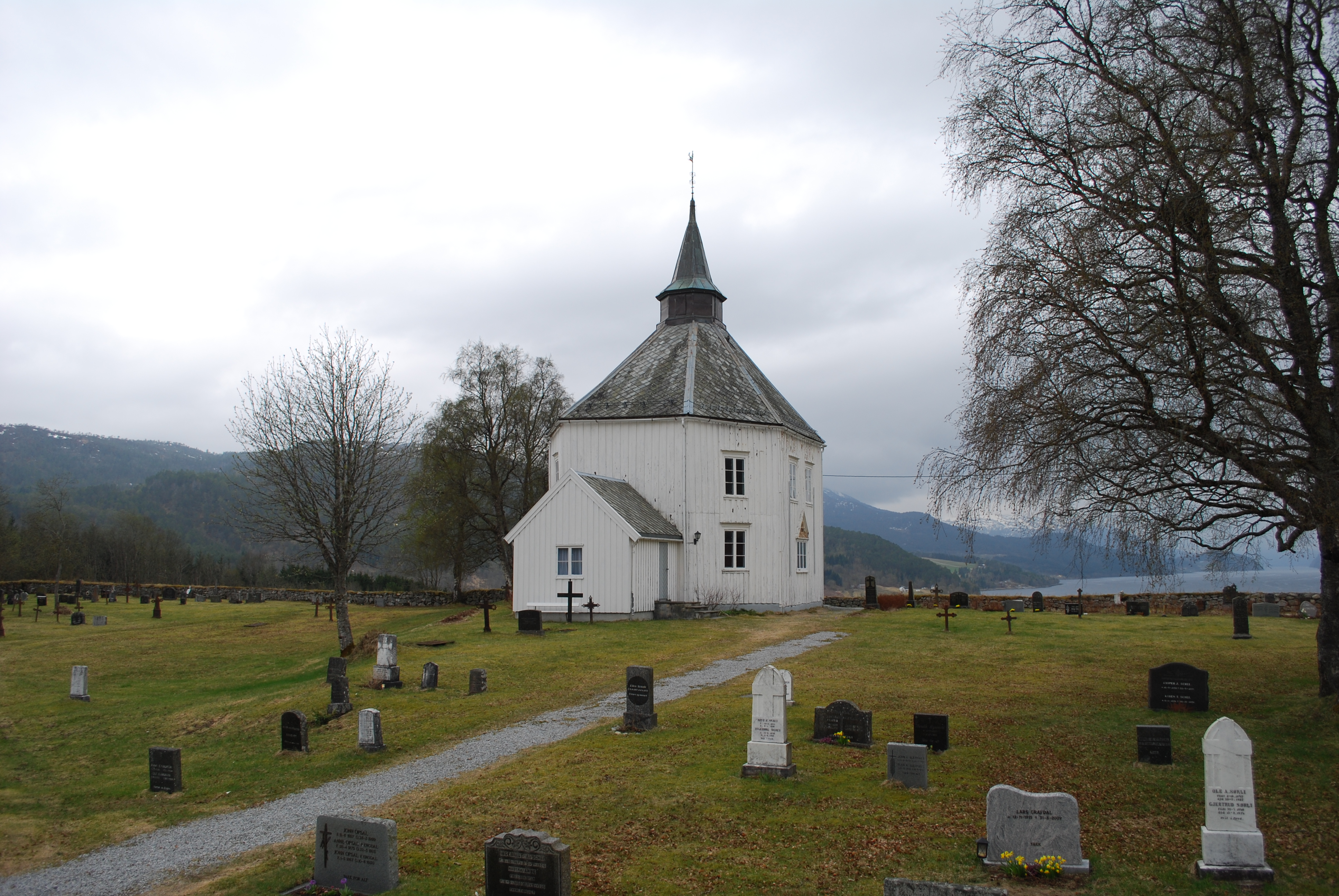
Vinje Church

The municipality was established on 1 January 2020 upon the merger of Hemne Municipality and Halsa Municipality as well as the Ytre Snillfjord area of Snillfjord Municipality. The area that used to be Halsa Municipality was transferred from Møre og Romsdal county and switched to Trøndelag county when the merger occurred.

=== Name ===
The parish of Heim was established in 1884. It is named after the old Heim farm (Old Norse: Heimr), since the first Heim Church was built on its ground. The name is identical with the word heimr which means "home", "homestead", or "farm".

=== Coat of arms ===
The coat of arms for Heim was designed and granted in 2019. It is a blue shield with a white ornamental design in the centre. The design was chosen to symbolize many different things. The blue background refers to air, water, and the sea. The white design is reminiscent of boats, fjords, seeds, and church spires, all of which are a part of the culture of the municipality.

=== Churches ===
The Church of Norway has five parishes (sokn) within Heim Municipality. It is part of the Orkdal prosti (deanery) within the Diocese of Nidaros.

Churches in Heim Municipality
Parish (sokn)	Church Name	Location of the Church	Year built
Halsa	Halsa Church	Halsa	1734
Heim	Heim Church	Heim	1883
Hemne	Hemne Church	Kyrksæterøra	1817
Valsøyfjord	Valsøyfjord Church	Valsøyfjord	1864
Vinje	Vinje Church	Vinjeøra	1820

== Geography ==
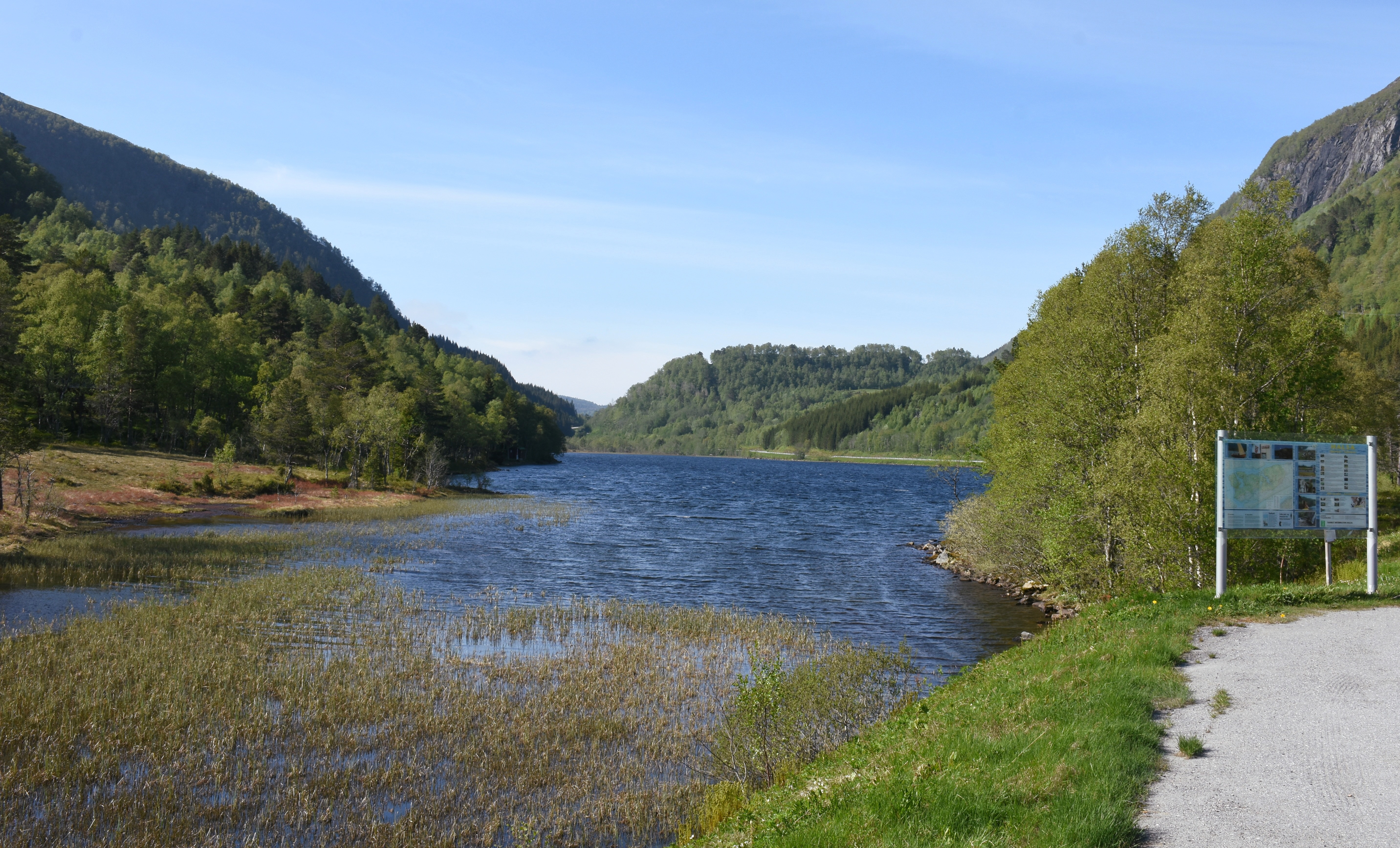
View of the lake Haugavatnet

Heim Municipality is located along south side of the Trondheimsleia strait along the Trøndelag/Møre og Romsdal county border. The rugged coastline contains many fjords including the Arasvikfjorden, Halsafjorden, Hemnfjorden, Skålvikfjorden, Snillfjorden, Valsøyfjorden, and Vinjefjorden. The lake Vasslivatnet is located in the municipality. The highest point in the municipality is the 1,039.96-metre (3,411.9 ft) tall mountain Ruten. The rivers Bøvra and Søo are both located in the municipality.

Orkland Municipality lies to the east, Rindal Municipality and Surnadal Municipality both lie to the south, Tingvoll Municipality lies to the west, and Aure Municipality and Hitra Municipality both lie to the north.

== Government ==
Heim Municipality is responsible for primary education (through 10th grade), outpatient health services, senior citizen services, welfare and other social services, zoning, economic development, and municipal roads and utilities. The municipality is governed by a municipal council of directly elected representatives. The mayor is indirectly elected by a vote of the municipal council. The municipality is under the jurisdiction of the Trøndelag District Court and the Frostating Court of Appeal. Waste management is done by the inter-municipal agency ReMidt, and waste collection is operated by ReTrans Midt.

=== Municipal council ===
The municipal council (Kommunestyre) of Heim Municipality is made up of 23 representatives that are elected to four year terms. The tables below show the current and historical composition of the council by political party.

Heim kommunestyre 2023–2027
Party name (in Norwegian)	Number of representatives
Labour Party (Arbeiderpartiet)	8
Progress Party (Fremskrittspartiet)	2
Conservative Party (Høyre)	4
Industry and Business Party (Industri‑ og Næringspartiet)	2
Christian Democratic Party (Kristelig Folkeparti)	1
Centre Party (Senterpartiet)	4
Halsa List (Halsalista)	2
Total number of members:	23

Heim kommunestyre 2019–2023
Party name (in Norwegian)	Number of representatives
Labour Party (Arbeiderpartiet)	10
Progress Party (Fremskrittspartiet)	1
Conservative Party (Høyre)	3
Christian Democratic Party (Kristelig Folkeparti)	1
Centre Party (Senterpartiet)	10
Halsa List (Halsalista)	3
Heim List (Heimlista)	3
Total number of members:	31

=== Mayors ===
The mayor (Norwegian: ordfører) of Heim Municipality is the political leader of the municipality and the chairperson of the municipal council. Here is a list of people who have held this position:

- 2020–2023: Odd Jarle Svanem (Sp)
- 2023–present: Marit Liabø Sandvik (Ap)

== Notable people ==
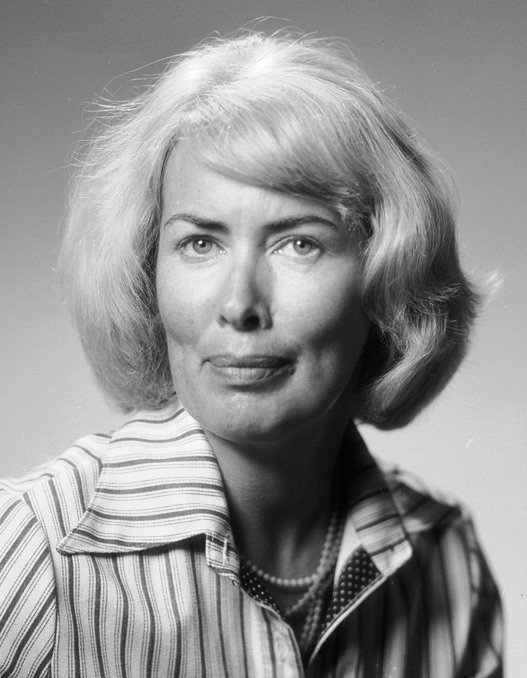
Anne Karin Elstad, 1976

- Nils Anton Vaagland (1872 in Halsa – 1965), a lawyer and politician who was Mayor of Stjørdal Municipality from 1911 to 1925
- Leif Halse (1896 in Halsa – 1984), a teacher, novelist, short story writer, children's writer, comics writer, and local historian
- Anne Karin Elstad (1938 in Halsa – 2012), an author
- Nina Valsø (1962 in Halsa – 2002), a playwright
- Erik Hoftun (born 1969 in Kyrksæterøra), a former football defender with 520 club caps and 30 for Norway
- Else-May Norderhus (born 1973 in Halsa), a Norwegian politician
- Vegard Forren (born 1988 in Kyrksæterøra), a professional footballer with over 300 club caps and 33 for Norway

== Gallery ==
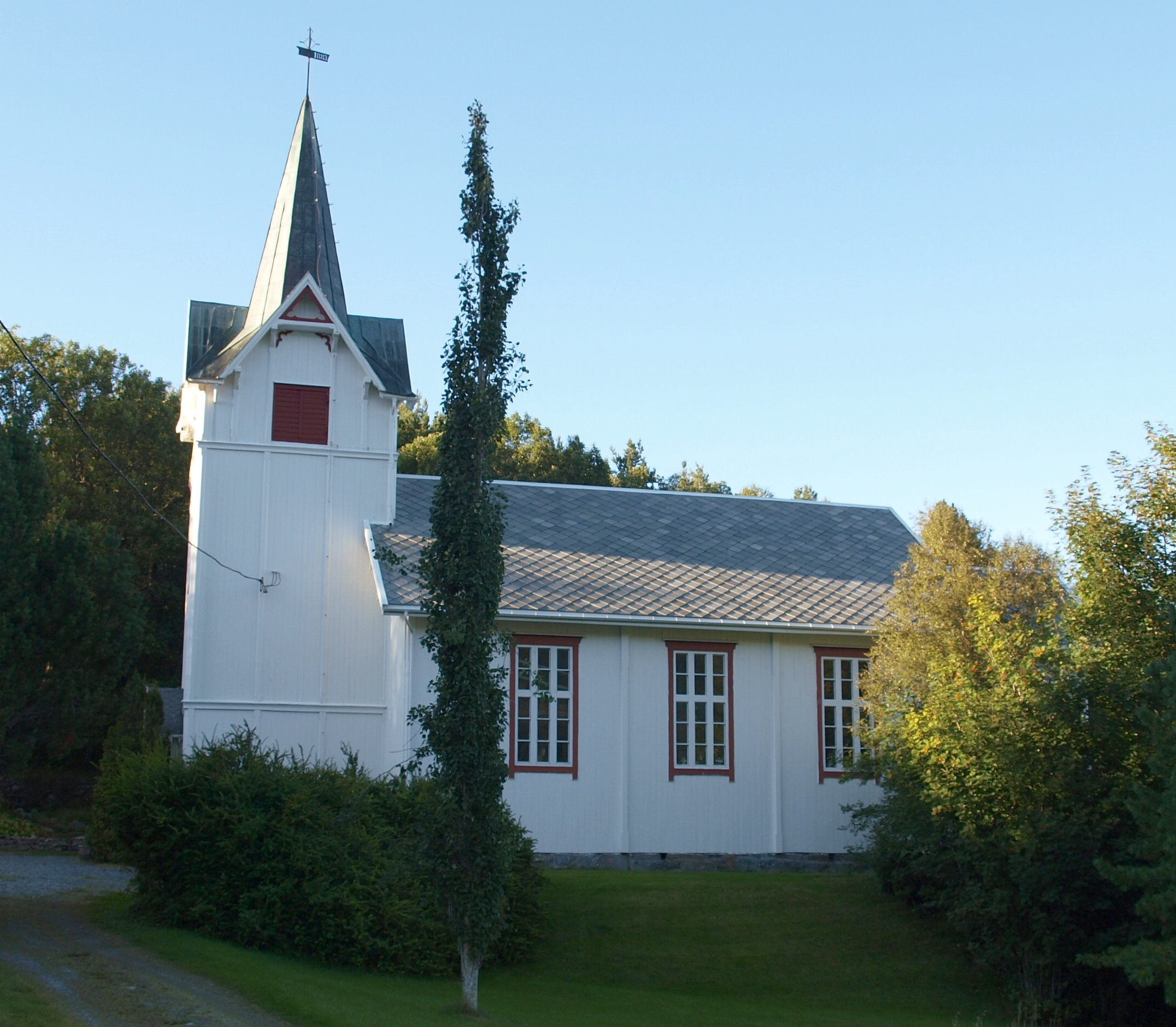
Heim kirke

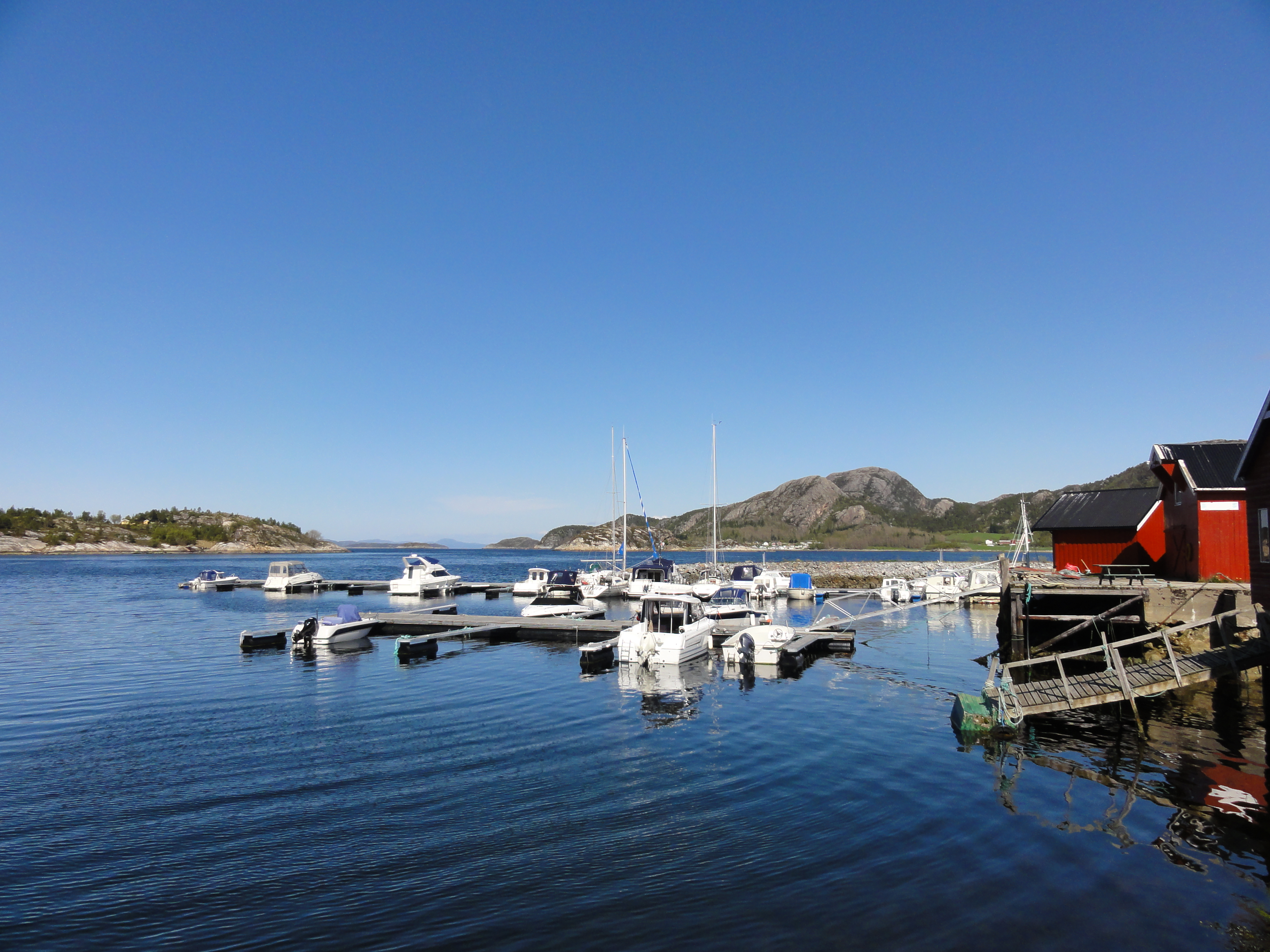
Vingvågen, Nórsko

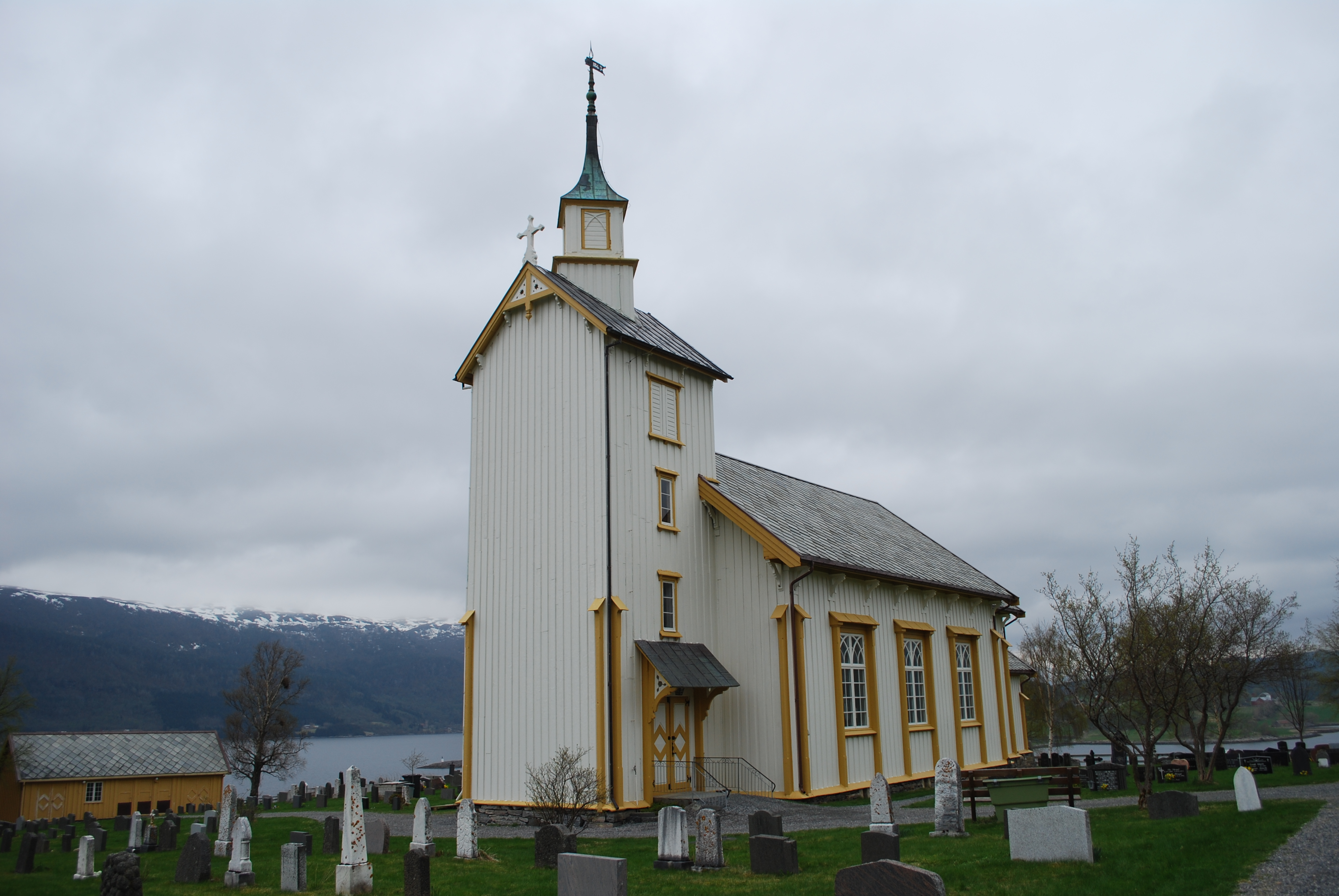
Valsøyfjord kirke

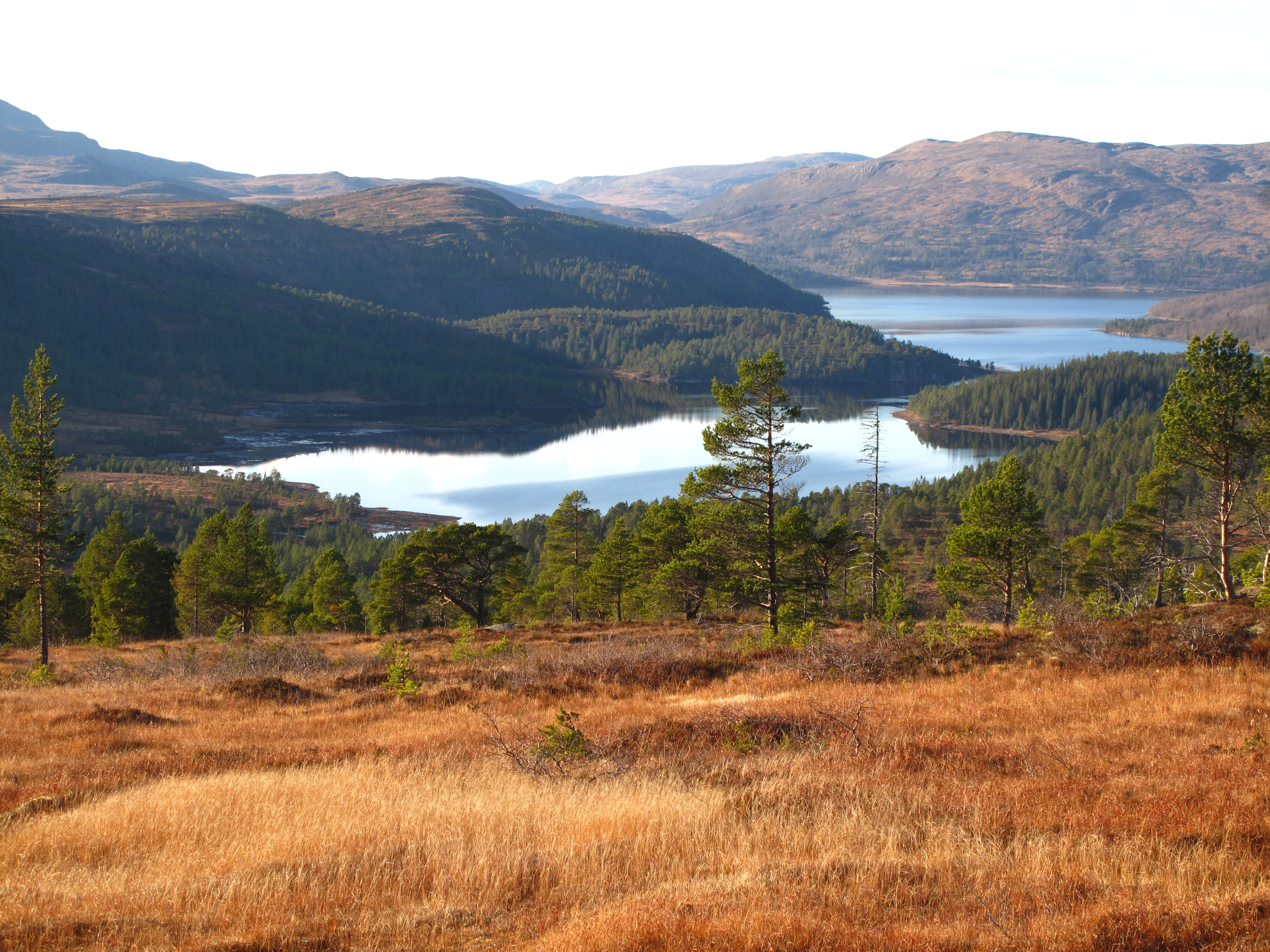
Våvatnet
