= Halsafjorden =

Fjord in Norway

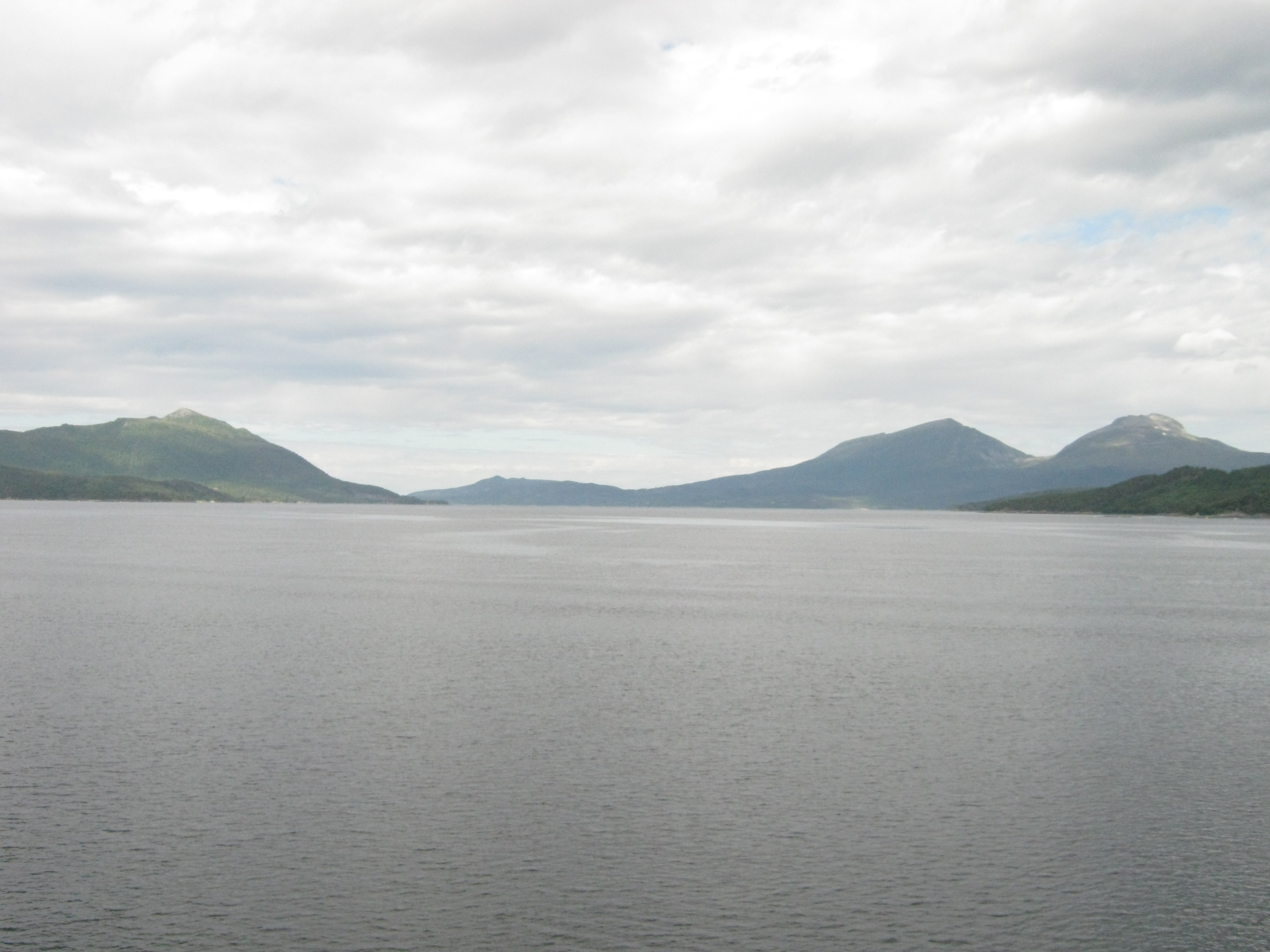
- View of the fjord
- Interactive map of the fjord
- Location: Trøndelag and Møre og Romsdal counties, Norway
- Coordinates: 63.05258°N 8.17386°E
- Type: Fjord
- Basin countries: Norway
- Max. length: 15 kilometres (9.3 mi)
- Max. width: 6 kilometres (3.7 mi)

Halsafjorden (English: Halsa Fjord) is a fjord located between Heim Municipality (in Trøndelag county) and Tingvoll Municipality (in Møre og Romsdal county), Norway. The 15-kilometre (9.3 mi) long fjord branches south off the Vinjefjorden and stretches about 15 kilometres (9.3 mi) until it becomes the Trongfjorden off which the Surnadalsfjorden later branches.

The European route E39 highway crosses the fjord by a car ferry from Kanestraum in Tingvoll Municipality to Halsanaustan in Heim Municipality. Investigations are made regarding a bridge over the fjord. The length would be around 2–3 kilometres (1.2–1.9 mi). Since the depth is around 490 metres (1,610 ft), an advanced solution with a floating tower in the middle has been suggested.

== See also ==
- List of Norwegian fjords
