= Skålvik Fjord =

Fjord in Trøndelag, Norway

- Skålvikfjorden (Norwegian)
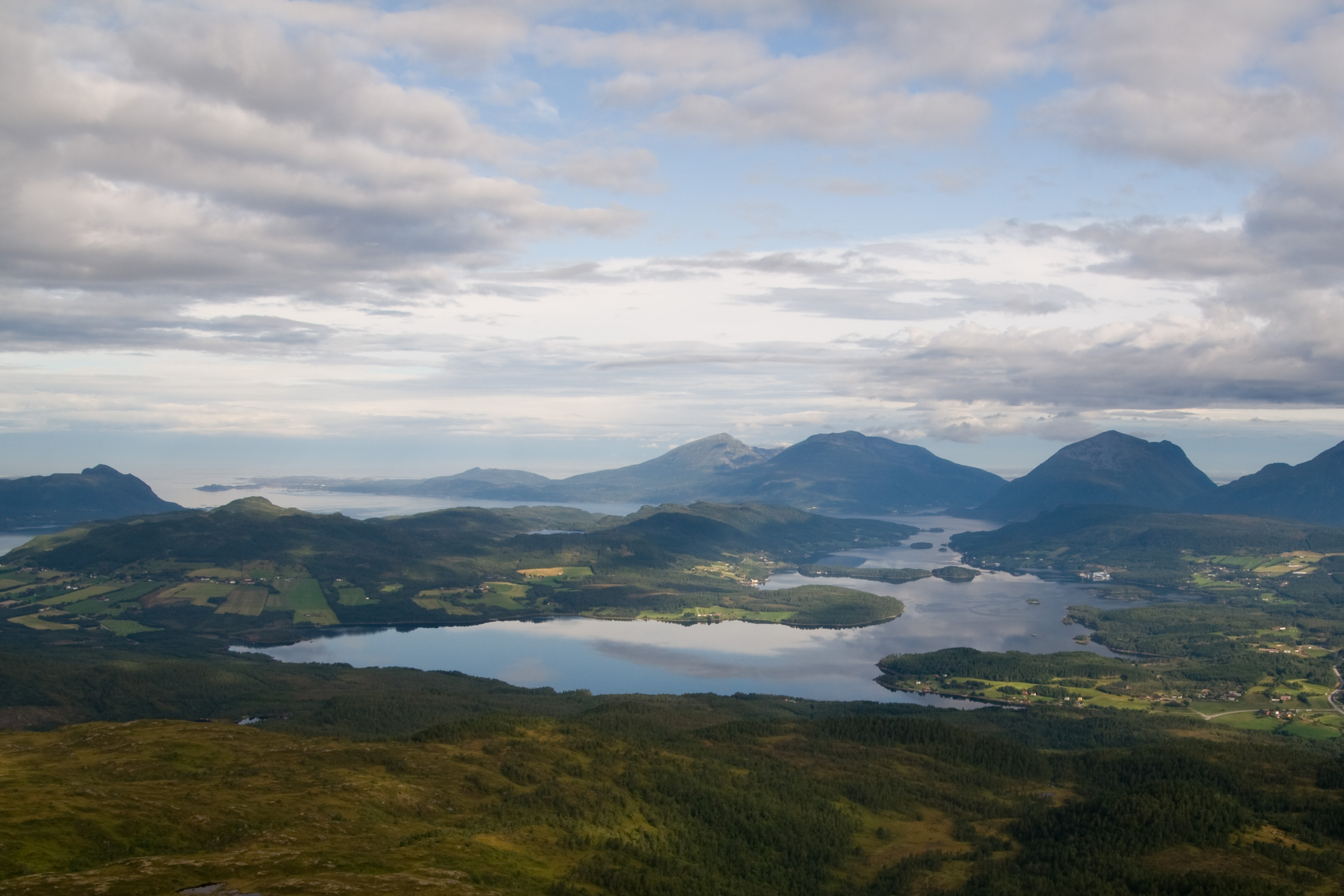
- View of the fjord seen from the mountain Tussan
- Interactive map of the fjord
- Location: Trøndelag county, Norway
- Coordinates: 63.11378°N 8.27614°E
- Type: Fjord
- Basin countries: Norway
- Max. length: 9.5 kilometres (5.9 mi)

Skålvik Fjord / Skaalvik Fjord (English) or Skålvikfjorden (Norwegian) is an arm of the Vinje Fjord in Heim Municipality in Trøndelag County, Norway. It is located in the traditional Nordmøre district (it was part of Møre og Romsdal county prior to 2020). The fjord extends 9.5 kilometers (5.9 mi) southwards to the village of Betna. Geologically, the same channel of the fjord extends north of the Vinje Fjord and continues as the Sålå Strait (Sålåsundet) in Aure Municipality.

The entrance to the fjord lies between the Korsneset peninsula to the west and the hamlet of Steinstien to the east. The outer part of the fjord is only 400 to 500 meters (1,300–1,600 ft) wide until it expands at the village of Vågland on the eastern shore, outside of Liabøen. Between Vågland and Klevset on the opposite shore there are several islands and islets in the fjord. There is a boatyard (Vaagland Båtbyggeri AS) in Vågland.

The village of Betna lies at the southwest end of the fjord, above Betna Bay (Betnvågen). Reit Bay (Reitvågen) lies on the other side, just east of Halsa. Reit Bay has two beaches; these were designated as the Reit Bay Nature Reserve (Reitvågen naturreservat) in 2002.

In 2002, the orca Keiko appeared in the Skålvik Fjord, resulting in extensive media coverage.

== See also ==
- List of Norwegian fjords
