= Halsa, Trøndelag =

Village in Heim Municipality, Norway

Halsa Halsanausta
- Village
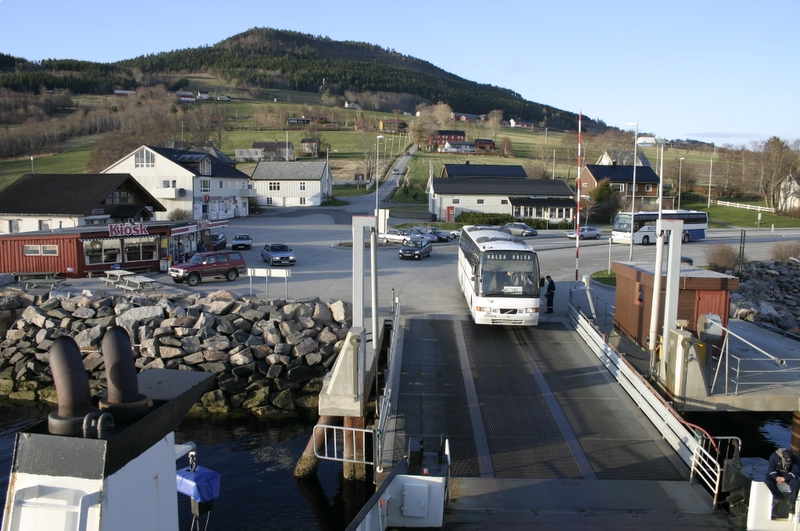
- View of Halsa, near the ferry
- Interactive map of Halsa
- Location within Trøndelag Location within Norway
- Coordinates: 63.07182°N 8.25092°E
- Country: Norway
- Region: Western Norway
- County: Trøndelag
- Municipality: Heim Municipality
- Elevation: 47 m (154 ft)
- Time zone: UTC+01:00 (CET)
  - Summer (DST): UTC+02:00 (CEST)
- Post Code: 6680 Halsanaustan

Halsa or Halsanausta is a village in Heim Municipality in Trøndelag county, Norway. The village is located along European route E39 at the junction of County Road 350 on an isthmus of a small peninsula between the Halsafjorden and Skålvikfjorden, about 10 kilometres (6.2 mi) southwest of the village of Liabøen. Halsa Church is located in this village.

A ferry runs from Halsanausta to the village of Kanestraum in Tingvoll Municipality, across the Halsafjorden.
