= Engan, Norway =

Village in Heim Municipality, Norway

Engan Engjan
- Village
- Interactive map of Engan
- Location within Trøndelag Location within Norway
- Coordinates: 63.12397°N 8.55911°E
- Country: Norway
- Region: Central Norway
- County: Trøndelag
- District: Fosen
- Municipality: Heim Municipality
- Elevation: 9 m (30 ft)
- Time zone: UTC+01:00 (CET)
  - Summer (DST): UTC+02:00 (CEST)
- Post Code: 6687 Valsøyfjord

Engan or Engjan (historically: Enge) is a village in Heim Municipality in Trøndelag county, Norway. The village is located on the west side of the Valsøyfjorden. Engan has a shop, and the Goat Boat Museum is located here.
