= Valsøyfjorden =

Fjord in Trøndelag, Norway

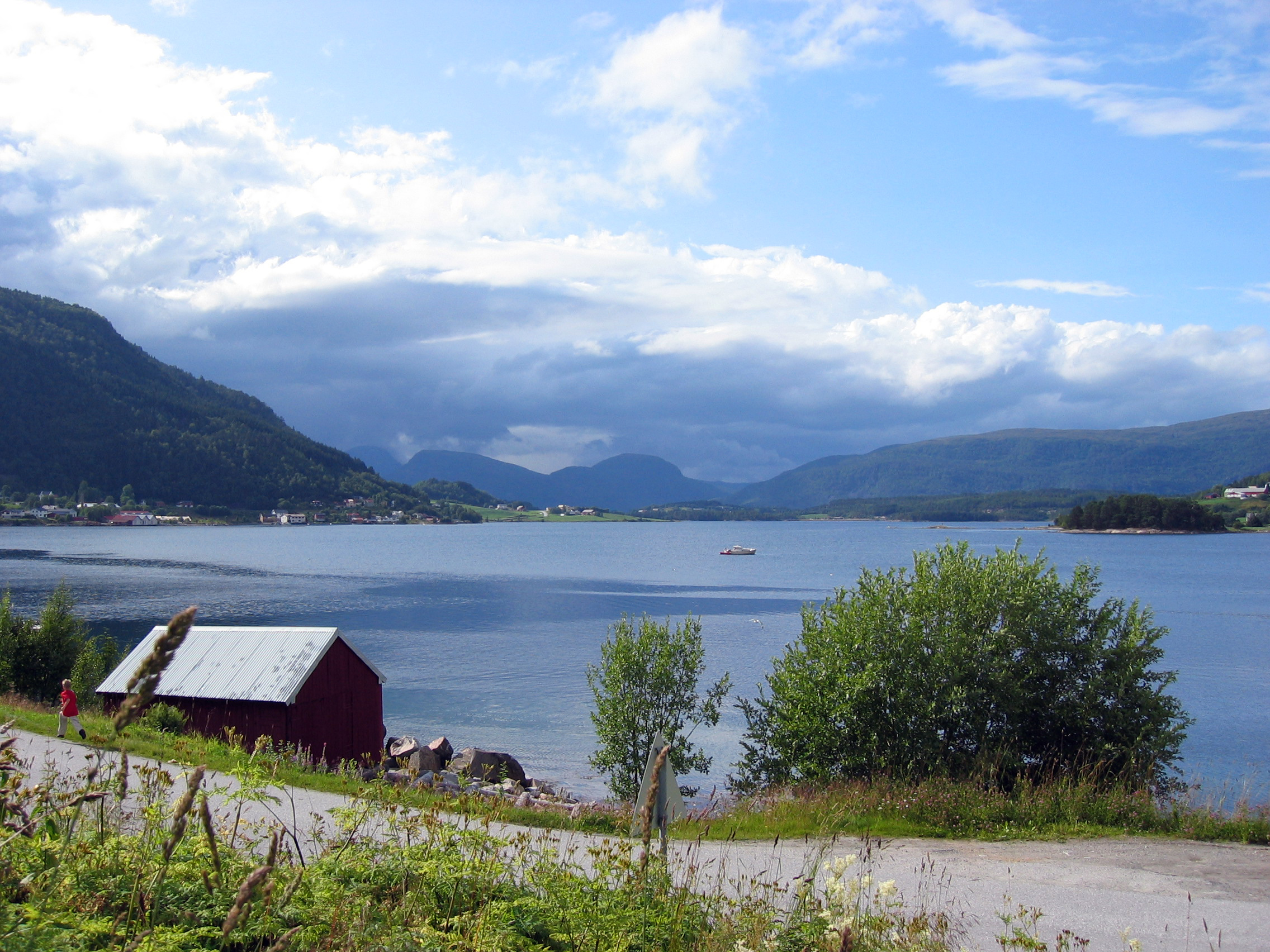
- View of the fjord
- Interactive map of the fjord
- Location: Trøndelag county, Norway
- Coordinates: 63.1212°N 8.5965°E
- Type: Fjord
- Primary outflows: Arasvikfjorden
- Basin countries: Norway
- Max. length: 10 kilometres (6.2 mi)
- Max. width: 1.5 kilometres (0.93 mi)

Valsøyfjorden is a fjord in Heim Municipality in Trøndelag county, Norway. It is a 10-kilometre (6.2 mi) fjord arm off of the Arasvikfjorden and it runs south past the island of Valsøya. The villages along the fjord include Engan, Hjellnes, and Valsøybotnen. The Valsøy Bridge is part of European route E39 and it was built in 1993 to cross over mouth of the fjord so travelers did not have to drive all the way around the fjord. The village of Valsøyfjord lies on the west side of the mouth of the fjord.

== See also ==
- List of Norwegian fjords
