= Valsøyfjord =

Village in Heim Municipality, Norway

- Village
- Interactive map of Valsøyfjord
- Location within Trøndelag Location within Norway
- Coordinates: 63.1378°N 8.4909°E
- Country: Norway
- Region: Western Norway
- County: Trøndelag
- Municipality: Heim Municipality
- Elevation: 28 m (92 ft)
- Time zone: UTC+01:00 (CET)
  - Summer (DST): UTC+02:00 (CEST)
- Post Code: 6687 Valsøyfjord

Valsøyfjord is a small village in Heim Municipality in Trøndelag county, Norway. The village is located along the Arasvikfjorden, just west of the Valsøyfjorden. The European route E39 highway runs through the village, just west of the Valsøy Bridge.

The whole parish of Valsøyfjord includes the village where the Valsøyfjord Church is located plus the whole area surrounding the Valsøyfjorden. The parish is home to about 800 people. Most of the people are working in agriculture and public services.

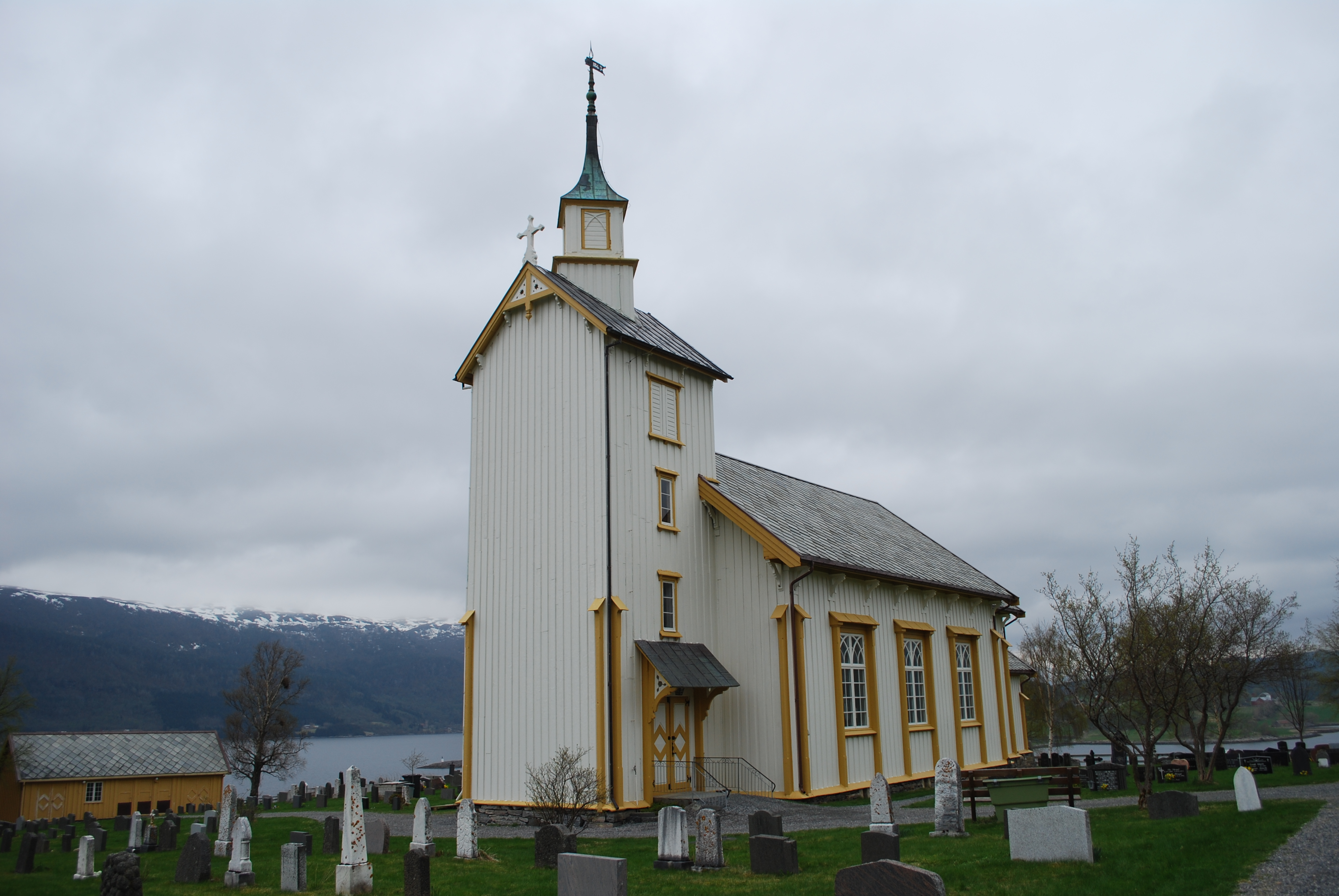
View of Valsøyfjord Church
