= Tustna Municipality =

Former municipality in Møre og Romsdal, Norway

Tustna Municipality Tustna kommune
- Former municipality
- Tusteren herred (historic name)
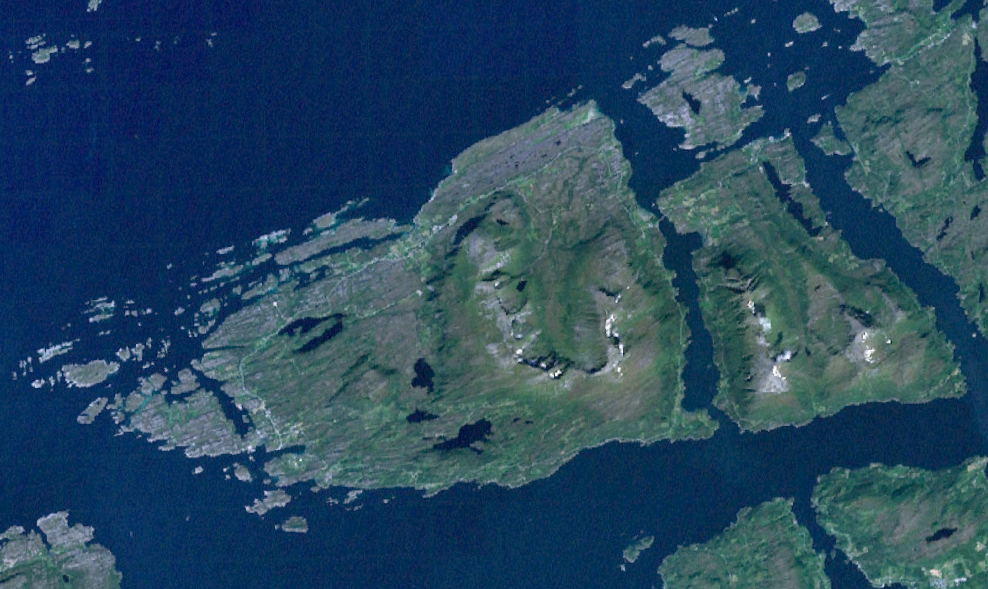
- Satellite image of Tustna from NASA

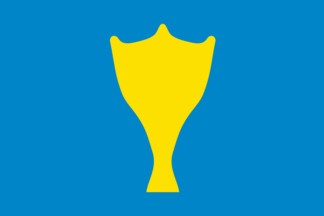
- Flag Coat of arms

- Møre og Romsdal within Norway

- Tustna within Møre og Romsdal
- Coordinates: 63°09′42″N 08°06′32″E
- Country: Norway
- County: Møre og Romsdal
- District: Nordmøre
- Established: 1 Jan 1874
  - Preceded by: Edøy Municipality
- Disestablished: 1 Jan 2006
  - Succeeded by: Aure Municipality
- Administrative centre: Gullstein

Government
  - Mayor (2003-2005): Ingunn Golmen (Sp)

Area (upon dissolution)
  - Total: 141.13 km^{2} (54.49 sq mi)
  - Land: 137.75 km^{2} (53.19 sq mi)
  - Water: 3.38 km^{2} (1.31 sq mi) 2.4%
  - Rank: #363 in Norway
- Highest elevation: 907.81 m (2,978.4 ft)

Population (2005)
  - Total: 1,006
  - Rank: #411 in Norway
  - Density: 7.1/km^{2} (18/sq mi)
  - Change (10 years): ▼ −11.1%
- Demonym: Tustning

Official language
  - Norwegian form: Neutral
- Time zone: UTC+01:00 (CET)
  - Summer (DST): UTC+02:00 (CEST)
- ISO 3166 code: NO-1572

Tustna is a former municipality in Møre og Romsdal county, Norway. The 141-square-kilometre (54 sq mi) municipality existed from 1874 until 2006 when it became part of the present-day Aure Municipality. The administrative centre was the village of Gullstein. The municipality was located in Nordmøre and it included the main islands of Tustna, Stabblandet, and Solskjelsøya, as well as many smaller, surrounding islets between the Edøyfjorden and the Vinjefjorden.

Prior to its dissolution in 2006, the 141-square-kilometre (54 sq mi) municipality was the 363rd largest by area out of the 433 municipalities in Norway. Tustna Municipality was the 411th most populous municipality in Norway with a population of about 1,006. The municipality's population density was 7.1 inhabitants per square kilometre (18/sq mi) and its population had decreased by 11.1% over the previous 10-year period.

== General information ==
The area of Tustna Municipality was originally a part of the large Edøy Municipality (see formannskapsdistrikt law). A meeting held on 17 March 1863 decided to build a church on the island of Tustern (which was the name of the island at that time) and thereby gain status as a separate parish within the large municipality. Gullstein Church was built in the village of Gullstein on the eastern side of the island in 1864. A royal resolution of 3 May 1873 directed that the parish of Tustern be separated from Edøy Municipality to create the new Tustern Municipality effective on 1 January 1874. The new municipality had an initial population of 1,179.

During the 1960s, there were many municipal mergers across Norway due to the work of the Schei Committee. On 1 January 1965, the part of Tustna Municipality on the island of Ertvågsøya (population: 85) was transferred to neighboring Aure Municipality to the east.

On 1 January 2006, Tustna Municipality (population: 1,006) was merged into Aure Municipality.

=== Name ===
The municipality (originally the parish) is named after the island of Tustna (the Old Norse form of the name may have been Old Norse: Þust), since it is the main island in the municipality. The name of the island was mentioned in historical records, as Toester, on a Dutch map from 1623. The name may be derived from the word ðústr which means "staff" or "walking stick". They could be referring to the form of one of the mountains on the island. Historically, the name of the municipality was spelled Tusteren. On 3 November 1917, a royal resolution changed the spelling of the name of the municipality to Tustna.

=== Coat of arms ===
The coat of arms was granted on 7 October 1988. The official blazon is "Azure, a klippfisk Or" (Norwegian: I blått en gul klippfisk). This means the arms have a blue field (background) and the charge is a klippfisk (a split and salted dried fish, usually cod). The charge has a tincture of Or which means it is commonly colored yellow, but if it is made out of metal, then gold is used. The design was chosen to symbolize the importance of the klippfisk industry which was pioneered in the Tustna area starting back in the 1690s. Traditionally the fish was spread out on rock to sun dry which gives the klippfisk its symmetrical shape (as opposed to the stockfish). The arms were designed by Jarle Skuseth. The municipal flag has the same design as the coat of arms.

=== Churches ===
The Church of Norway had one parish (sokn) within Tustna Municipality. At the time of the municipal dissolution, it was part of the Halsa prestegjeld and the Ytre Nordmøre prosti (deanery) in the Diocese of Møre.

Churches in Tustna Municipality
Parish (sokn)	Church name	Location of the church	Year built
Tustna	Gullstein Church	Gullstein	1864
Tustna	Sør-Tustna Chapel	Tømmervåg	1952

== Geography ==
The island municipality was located in Nordmøre. It included the main islands of Tustna, Stabblandet, and Solskjelsøya, as well as many smaller, surrounding islets between the Edøyfjorden and the Korsnesfjorden. The highest point in the municipality was the 907.81-metre (2,978.4 ft) tall mountain Innerbergsalen. Smøla Municipality was located to the north, Aure Municipality was to the east, Halsa Municipality and Tingvoll Municipality were to the south, and Kristiansund Municipality was to the west.

== Government ==
While it existed, Tustna Municipality was responsible for primary education (through 10th grade), outpatient health services, senior citizen services, welfare and other social services, zoning, economic development, and municipal roads and utilities. The municipality was governed by a municipal council of directly elected representatives. The mayor was indirectly elected by a vote of the municipal council. The municipality was under the jurisdiction of the Frostating Court of Appeal.

=== Municipal council ===
The municipal council (Kommunestyre) of Tustna Municipality was made up of 17 representatives that were elected to four year terms. The tables below show the historical composition of the council by political party.

Tustna kommunestyre 2003–2005
Party name (in Norwegian)	Number of representatives
Labour Party (Arbeiderpartiet)	8
Joint list of the Conservative Party (Høyre), Christian Democratic Party (Kristelig Folkeparti), Centre Party (Senterpartiet), and Liberal Party (Venstre)	9
Total number of members:	17
Note: On 1 January 2006, Tustna Municipality became part of Aure Municipality.

Tustna kommunestyre 1999–2003
Party name (in Norwegian)	Number of representatives
Labour Party (Arbeiderpartiet)	9
Conservative Party (Høyre)	2
Christian Democratic Party (Kristelig Folkeparti)	1
Centre Party (Senterpartiet)	2
Socialist Left Party (Sosialistisk Venstreparti)	1
Liberal Party (Venstre)	2
Total number of members:	17

Tustna kommunestyre 1995–1999
Party name (in Norwegian)	Number of representatives
Labour Party (Arbeiderpartiet)	7
Conservative Party (Høyre)	2
Christian Democratic Party (Kristelig Folkeparti)	1
Centre Party (Senterpartiet)	3
Socialist Left Party (Sosialistisk Venstreparti)	1
Liberal Party (Venstre)	3
Total number of members:	17

Tustna kommunestyre 1991–1995
Party name (in Norwegian)	Number of representatives
Labour Party (Arbeiderpartiet)	7
Conservative Party (Høyre)	1
Christian Democratic Party (Kristelig Folkeparti)	2
Centre Party (Senterpartiet)	4
Socialist Left Party (Sosialistisk Venstreparti)	1
Liberal Party (Venstre)	2
Total number of members:	17

Tustna kommunestyre 1987–1991
Party name (in Norwegian)	Number of representatives
Labour Party (Arbeiderpartiet)	7
Conservative Party (Høyre)	2
Christian Democratic Party (Kristelig Folkeparti)	2
Centre Party (Senterpartiet)	3
Socialist Left Party (Sosialistisk Venstreparti)	1
Liberal Party (Venstre)	2
Total number of members:	17

Tustna kommunestyre 1983–1987
Party name (in Norwegian)	Number of representatives
Labour Party (Arbeiderpartiet)	7
Conservative Party (Høyre)	2
Christian Democratic Party (Kristelig Folkeparti)	2
Centre Party (Senterpartiet)	4
Liberal Party (Venstre)	2
Total number of members:	17

Tustna kommunestyre 1979–1983
Party name (in Norwegian)	Number of representatives
Labour Party (Arbeiderpartiet)	7
Conservative Party (Høyre)	2
Christian Democratic Party (Kristelig Folkeparti)	2
Centre Party (Senterpartiet)	4
Liberal Party (Venstre)	2
Total number of members:	17

Tustna kommunestyre 1975–1979
Party name (in Norwegian)	Number of representatives
Labour Party (Arbeiderpartiet)	6
Christian Democratic Party (Kristelig Folkeparti)	2
Centre Party (Senterpartiet)	5
Liberal Party (Venstre)	4
Total number of members:	17

Tustna kommunestyre 1971–1975
Party name (in Norwegian)	Number of representatives
Labour Party (Arbeiderpartiet)	7
Christian Democratic Party (Kristelig Folkeparti)	2
Centre Party (Senterpartiet)	4
Liberal Party (Venstre)	4
Total number of members:	17

Tustna kommunestyre 1967–1971
Party name (in Norwegian)	Number of representatives
Labour Party (Arbeiderpartiet)	8
Christian Democratic Party (Kristelig Folkeparti)	1
Centre Party (Senterpartiet)	4
Liberal Party (Venstre)	4
Total number of members:	17

Tustna kommunestyre 1963–1967
Party name (in Norwegian)	Number of representatives
Labour Party (Arbeiderpartiet)	8
Christian Democratic Party (Kristelig Folkeparti)	2
Centre Party (Senterpartiet)	3
Liberal Party (Venstre)	4
Total number of members:	17

Tustna herredsstyre 1959–1963
Party name (in Norwegian)	Number of representatives
Labour Party (Arbeiderpartiet)	9
Christian Democratic Party (Kristelig Folkeparti)	1
Centre Party (Senterpartiet)	3
Liberal Party (Venstre)	4
Total number of members:	17

Tustna herredsstyre 1955–1959
Party name (in Norwegian)	Number of representatives
Labour Party (Arbeiderpartiet)	8
Farmers' Party (Bondepartiet)	5
Liberal Party (Venstre)	4
Total number of members:	17

Tustna herredsstyre 1952–1955
Party name (in Norwegian)	Number of representatives
Labour Party (Arbeiderpartiet)	6
Farmers' Party (Bondepartiet)	4
Liberal Party (Venstre)	4
Local List(s) (Lokale lister)	2
Total number of members:	16

Tustna herredsstyre 1947–1951
Party name (in Norwegian)	Number of representatives
Labour Party (Arbeiderpartiet)	8
Farmers' Party (Bondepartiet)	5
Liberal Party (Venstre)	3
Total number of members:	16

Tustna herredsstyre 1945–1947
Party name (in Norwegian)	Number of representatives
Labour Party (Arbeiderpartiet)	7
Christian Democratic Party (Kristelig Folkeparti)	2
List of workers, fishermen, and small farmholders (Arbeidere, fiskere, småbrukere liste)	1
Local List(s) (Lokale lister)	6
Total number of members:	16

Tustna herredsstyre 1937–1941*
Party name (in Norwegian)	Number of representatives
Labour Party (Arbeiderpartiet)	7
Local List(s) (Lokale lister)	9
Total number of members:	16
Note: Due to the German occupation of Norway during World War II, no elections were held for new municipal councils until after the war ended in 1945.

=== Mayors ===
The mayor (Norwegian: ordfører) of Tustna Municipality was the political leader of the municipality and the chairperson of the municipal council. The following people have held this position:

- 1874–1875: Peder Trondsen Størseth
- 1876–1879: Jonas Moe Halse
- 1880–1913: Gjermund Trondsen Øvrevik
- 1914–1919: Ole P. Guldsten
- 1920–1923: Martinius P. Jørgenvåg
- 1923–1925: Sivert Madsen Follestad
- 1926–1934: Martinius P. Jørgenvåg
- 1935–1942: Edvard Øvrevik
- 1943–1945: Peder M. Jørgenvåg
- 1945–1947: Johannes H. Nordheim
- 1948–1951: Thorstein Hamnes
- 1951–1951: Peder J. Tømmervåg
- 1952–1959: Johan D. Tømmervåg
- 1960–1963: Martin Sæterøy
- 1964–1966: Trygve Høvik
- 1966–1967: Johan D. Tømmervåg
- 1968–1971: Magnar Guldstein
- 1972–1979: Martinius P. Jørgenvåg
- 1980–1983: Gjermund E. Øvrevik
- 1984–1987: Nils Hamnes
- 1988–1988: Jon P. Solheim
- 1992–1993: Hallvard Husby
- 1994–1999: Daniel Golmen
- 1999–2003: Hans G. Lauritzen (Ap)
- 2003–2005: Ingunn Oldervik Golmen (Sp)

== See also ==
- List of former municipalities of Norway
