= Norwegian County Road 362 (Møre og Romsdal) =

Road in Norway

County Road 362

Route information
- Length: 19.1 km (11.9 mi)

Major junctions
- North end: Fv680 at Giset, Aure Municipality
- South end: Fv682 at Vågosen, Aure Municipality

Location
- Country: Norway
- Counties: Møre og Romsdal

Highway system
- Roads in Norway; National Roads; County Roads

County Road 362 (Norwegian: Fylkesvei 362) is a 19.1-kilometer (11.9 mi) road in Aure Municipality.

The road branches off from County Road 680 at the Mjosund Bridge in Giset and runs south along the east coast of the island of Ertvågsøya. It then turns west and runs along the shore above Arasvik Fjord until it terminates in Vågosen at the junction with County Road 682, just before the ferry dock in Arasvika.

The road is also named Mjosundvegen (Mjosund Road) after the strait that it runs parallel to along its northern stretch. The road is subject to landslides in places.
