= Norwegian County Road 682 =

Road in Norway

County Road 682

Route information
- Length: 13.2 km (8.2 mi)

Major junctions
- North end: Fv680 at Espset, Aure Municipality
- Fv362 at Vågosen, Aure Municipality
- South end: E39 at Hennset, Heim Municipality

Location
- Country: Norway
- Counties: Møre og Romsdal, Trøndelag

Highway system
- Roads in Norway; National Roads; County Roads

County Road 682 (Norwegian: Fylkesvei 682) is a road in Aure Municipality (in Møre og Romsdal county) and Heim Municipality (in Trøndelag county) in Norway. In addition to its 13.2-kilometer (8.2 mi) land length, the route also includes a 3.2-kilometer (2.0 mi) ferry connection.

The road branches off from County Road 680 at Espset and runs south across the island of Ertvågsøya, first along the east shore of Foldfjord and then along the east shore of the lake Skausetvatnet. County Road 362 branches off to the east at Vågosen just before the road reaches the ferry dock at Arasvika. There the route continues via ferry across Arasvik Fjord to Hennset, where it joins European route E39. The road is also named Arasvikvegen (Arasvika Road) for its entire length.

Prior to January 1, 2010, the route was a national road, but control and maintenance of the road was transferred to the counties from the national government on that date, and so now it is a county road.
