= Vågosen =

Vågosen Vågos
- Village
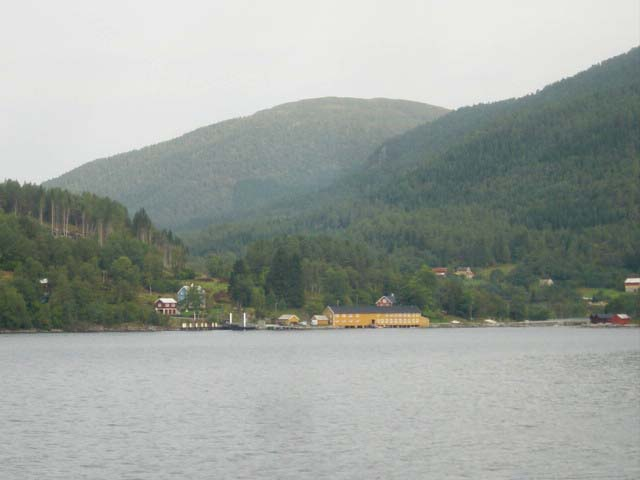
- Vågosen seen from the fjord

- Location in Møre og Romsdal Vågosen (Norway)
- Coordinates: 63°9′58″N 8°26′23″E
- Country: Norway
- Region: Western Norway
- County: Møre og Romsdal
- District: Nordmøre
- Municipality: Aure Municipality
- Elevation: 13 m (43 ft)
- Time zone: UTC+01:00 (CET)
  - Summer (DST): UTC+02:00 (CEST)
- Post Code: 6694 Foldfjorden

Vågosen or Vågos is a village in Aure Municipality in Møre og Romsdal county, Norway.

== Geography ==
Vågosen lies on the south side of the island of Ertvågsøy along Arasvik Fjord at the mouth of the Vågos River (Vågoselva). There are road connections to Vågosen via County Road 682 from the north and County Road 362 from the east. The ferry west of the village connects Vågosen to Hennset in Heim Municipality and European route E39.
