= Arasvika–Hennset Ferry =

Coordinates: 63°09′00″N 08°26′15″E

Arasvika–Hennset
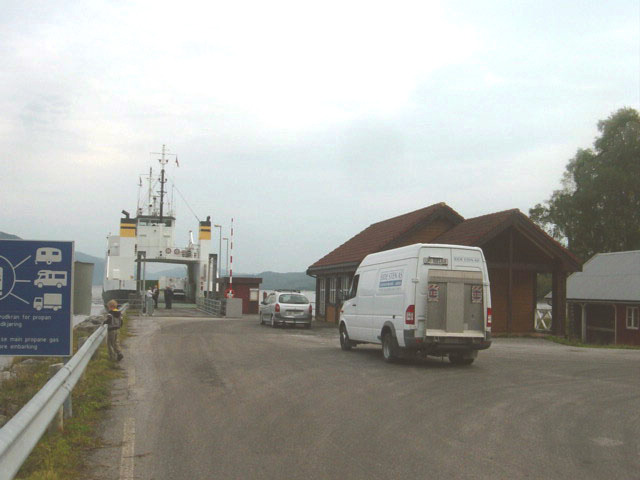
- Ferry at Hennset
- Waterway: Arasvik Fjord
- Route: Fv682
- Carries: Automobiles and passengers
- Terminals: Arasvika; Hennset
- Operator: Fjord1
- Authority: Norwegian Public Roads Administration
- Travel time: 15 min
- Frequency: 22 / day
- No. of vessels: MF Driva
- Daily vehicles: 98 (2014)
- Connections at Arasvika
- Road: Fv682 Fv362
- Connections at Hennset
- Road: Fv682 E39

The Arasvika–Hennset Ferry is a ferry service on County Road 682 across the Arasvikfjorden from Aure Municipality in Møre og Romsdal county and Heim Municipality in Trøndelag county. The route connects the Arasvika ferry dock on the island of Ertvågsøya in Aure to the Hennset ferry dock on the mainland in Heim. The route is operated by the transport conglomerate Fjord1.

The duration of the passage is 15 minutes, and the 3.2-kilometer (2.0 mi) route is served by MF Driva with 22 departures per day in each direction every day. In 2014 the annual average daily traffic was 98 vehicles.
