= Gullstein =

Village in Aure Municipality, Norway

- Village
- Interactive map of Gullstein
- Location within Møre og Romsdal Location within Norway
- Coordinates: 63°12′25″N 08°08′57″E
- Country: Norway
- Region: Western Norway
- County: Møre og Romsdal
- District: Nordmøre
- Municipality: Aure Municipality
- Elevation: 15 m (49 ft)
- Time zone: UTC+01:00 (CET)
  - Summer (DST): UTC+02:00 (CEST)
- Post Code: 6590 Tustna

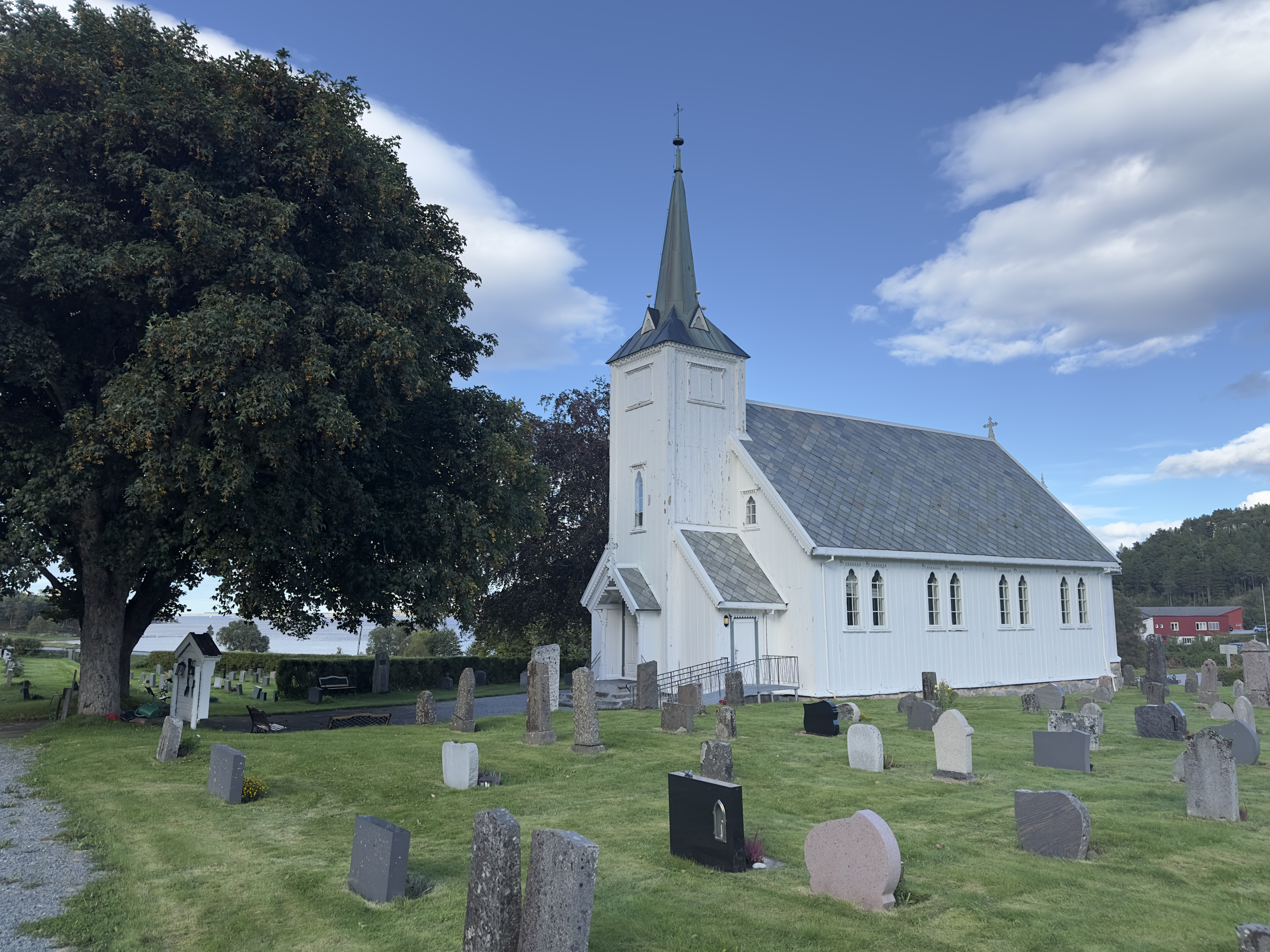
Gullstein Church

Gullstein is a village in Aure Municipality in Møre og Romsdal county, Norway. The village is located on the eastern side of the island of Tustna, about 10 kilometres (6.2 mi) east of the village of Tømmervåg and about 20 kilometres (12 mi) west of the village of Aure. The Soleimsund Bridge connects Gullstein (and the island of Tustna) to the neighboring island of Stabblandet to the east.

The village was the administrative centre of the old Tustna Municipality which became part of Aure Municipality in 2006. The village is the site of Gullstein Church.
