= Foldfjord =

Fjord in Møre og Romsdal, Norway

Foldfjorden
- Foldfjord
- Interactive map of the fjord
- Location: Møre og Romsdal, Norway
- Coordinates: 63°15′29″N 8°23′16″E
- Type: Fjord
- Basin countries: Norway
- Max. length: 7 kilometres (4.3 mi)
- Max. width: 1.2 kilometres (0.75 mi)
- Max. depth: 74 metres (243 ft)
- Surface elevation: 0 m (0 ft)

Foldfjord (English) or Foldfjorden (Norwegian) is a fjord on the island of Ertvågsøya in Aure Municipality in Møre og Romsdal county, Norway. The fjord's natural surroundings support a large wildlife population, including many red deer. County Road 682 runs along the east shore of the fjord. At the north end, County Road 680 crosses the fjord at a narrow point near Espset. The fjord flows north where it joins Gjerdavika, an arm off Edøyfjorden.
