= Norwegian County Road 680 =

Road in Møre og Romsdal and Trøndelag, Norway

County Road 680
- Bokmål: Fylkesvei 680; Nynorsk: Fylkesveg 680

Route information
- Maintained by Norwegian Public Roads Administration
- Length: 111.6 km (69.3 mi)

Major junctions
- West end: E39 at Kristiansund
- Fv370 at Tømmervåg, Aure; Fv669 at Tustna, Aure; Fv370 at Gullstein, Aure; Fv367 at Sagvågen, Aure; Fv682 at Espset, Aure; Fv362 at Mjosund Bridge, Aure; Fv359 at Kjelklia, Aure; Fv364 at Vean, Aure; Fv357 at Torset, Aure; Fv361 at Ulvsnes, Aure; Fv310 at Ødalssaga, Heim; Fv315 at Svanem, Heim; Fv293 at Å, Heim; Fv300 at Kyrksæterøra, Heim; Fv301 at Kyrksæterøra, Heim
- East end: E39 at Stormyra, Heim

Location
- Country: Norway
- Counties: Møre og Romsdal, Trøndelag
- Major cities: Kristiansund, Vinjeøra, Kyrksæterøra

Highway system
- Roads in Norway; National Roads; County Roads
← Fv671	→ Fv682

Norwegian County Road 680 (Norwegian: Fylkesvei 680) is a road passing through Kristiansund Municipality and Aure Municipality in Møre og Romsdal county and Heim Municipality in Trøndelag county, Norway. In addition to its 111.6-kilometer (69.3 mi) land length (67.5 kilometers or 41.9 miles in Møre og Romsdal and 44.1 kilometers or 27.4 miles in Trøndelag), the route also includes the 7.0-kilometer (4.3 mi) Seivika–Tømmervåg Ferry across the Talgsjø channel.

The route starts in Øygarden in Kristiansund Municipality, where it branches off from European route E70, and runs west to Seivika, from which there is a ferry to Tømmervåg on the island of Tustna. It then takes a meandering coastal route eastward through Aure Municipality to Svanem in Trøndelag, where it turns south and runs through Kyrksæterøra before meeting European route E39 in Stormyra, just outside Vinjeøra.

Prior to January 1, 2010, the route was a Norwegian national road, but control and maintenance of the road was transferred to the counties from the national government on that date, and so now it is a Norwegian county road.
