= Seivika–Tømmervåg Ferry =

Ferry route in Norway

Coordinates: 63°08′04″N 07°54′20″E

Seivika–Tømmervåg
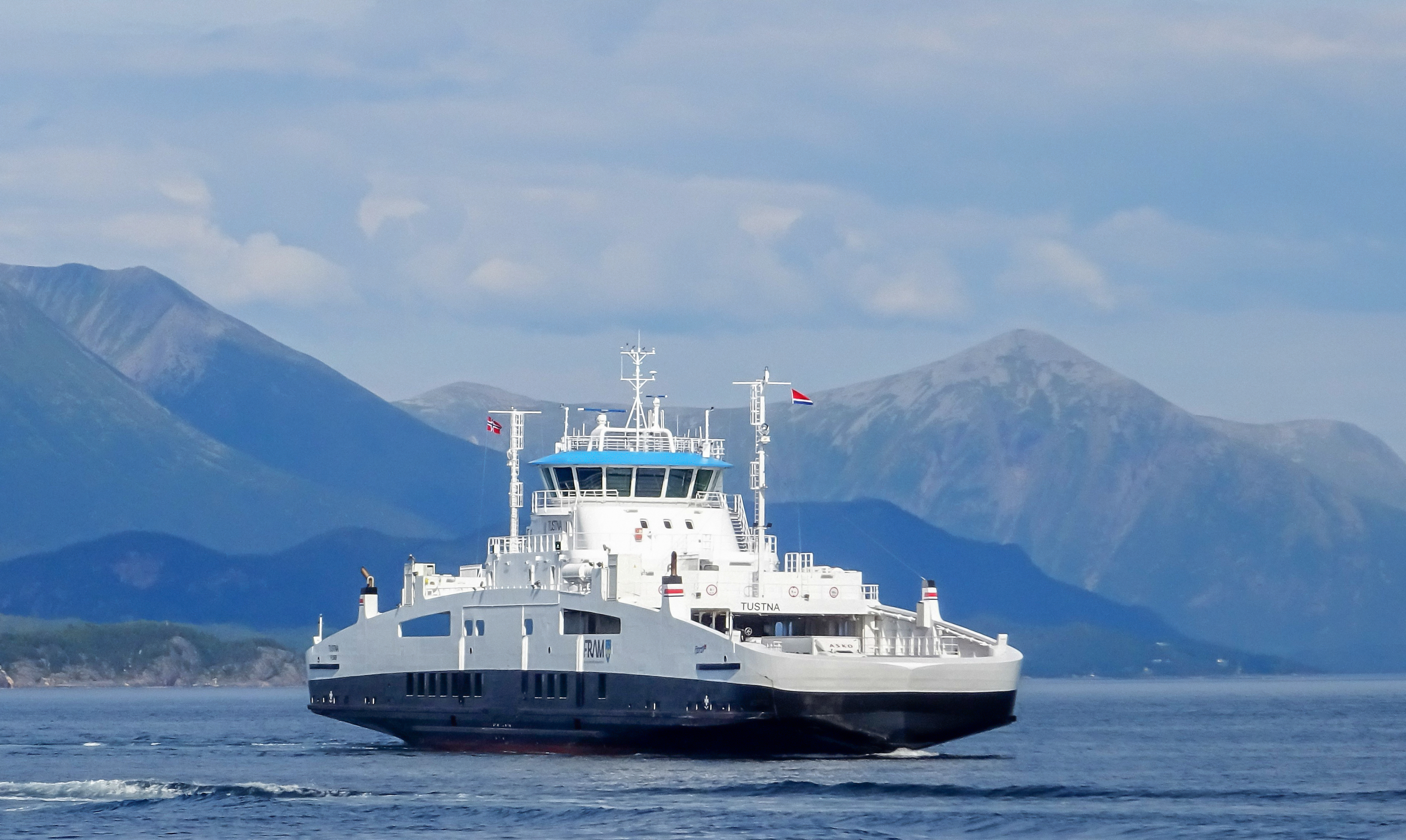
- Fjord1 electric ferry, MF Tustna, arriving at the Seivika terminal in 2021.
- Waterway: Talgsjøen
- Route: Fv680
- Carries: Automobiles and passengers
- Terminals: Seivika; Tømmervåg
- Operator: Fjord1
- Authority: Norwegian Public Roads Administration
- Travel time: 25 min
- Frequency: 32 / day
- No. of vessels: MF Tustna; MF Grip
- Daily ridership: 596 (2014)
- Daily vehicles: 690 (2014)
- Connections at Seivika
- Road: Fv680
- Connections at Tømmervåg
- Road: Fv680

The Seivika–Tømmervåg Ferry is a ferry service on County Road 680 across the Talgsjøen channel in the Nordmøre district in the Norwegian county of Møre og Romsdal. It connects the Seivika ferry dock on the island of Nordlandet in Kristiansund Municipality to the Tømmervåg ferry dock on the island of Tustna in Aure Municipality. The route is operated by the transport conglomerate Fjord1.

The duration of the passage is 25 minutes, and the 7.0-kilometer (4.3 mi) route is served by MF Bjørnsund and MF Stordal with 32 departures per day in each direction every day. The route was served by MF Glutra from 2002 to 2010, when the vessel was damaged by a fire. In 2014, the annual average daily traffic was 690 vehicles and 596 passengers (ranking 20th in Norway).
