= Aure (village) =

Village in Aure Municipality, Norway

- Village
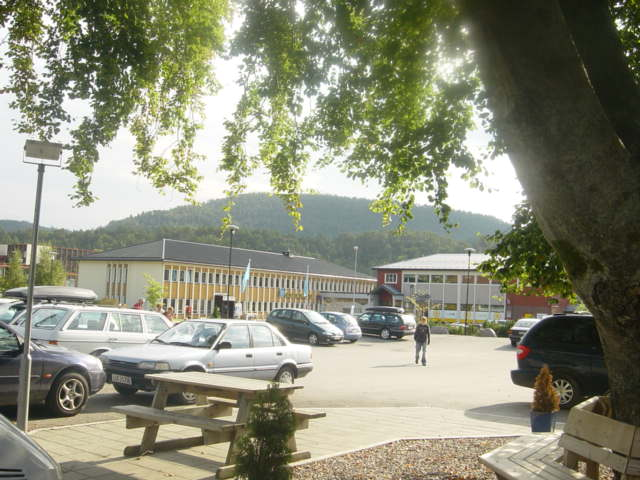
- View of the village
- Interactive map of Aure
- Location within Møre og Romsdal Location within Norway
- Coordinates: 63.2679°N 8.5291°E
- Country: Norway
- Region: Western Norway
- County: Møre og Romsdal
- District: Nordmøre
- Municipality: Aure Municipality

Area
  - Total: 0.54 km^{2} (0.21 sq mi)
- Elevation: 16 m (52 ft)

Population (2024)
  - Total: 636
  - Density: 1,178/km^{2} (3,050/sq mi)
- Time zone: UTC+01:00 (CET)
  - Summer (DST): UTC+02:00 (CEST)
- Post Code: 6690 Aure

Aure is the administrative centre of Aure Municipality in Møre og Romsdal county, Norway. The village is located on the mainland, along the Aursundet strait.

The 0.54-square-kilometre (130-acre) village has a population (2024) of 636 and a population density of 1,178 inhabitants per square kilometre (3,050/sq mi).

The village looks across the strait at the small islands of Ruøya and Rottøya and the large island of Ertvågsøya beyond those two islands. The river Aurelva runs through the village and empties into the sea. The Aursund Bridge and Mjosund Bridge form a road connection from the village of Aure to the island of Ertvågsøya.

The village of Aure has been the site of Aure Church since the Middle Ages. There have been several church buildings on this church site over the centuries. Aure Church is the main church for the municipality.
