= Aursund Bridge =

Aursund Bridge Aursundbrua
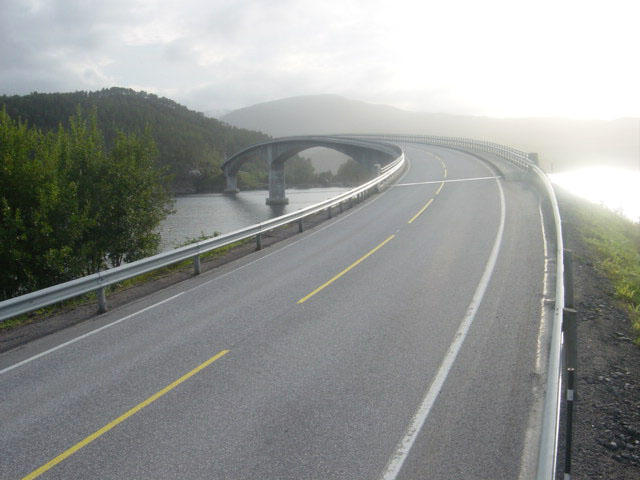
- View of the bridge
- Coordinates: 63°16′18″N 8°29′53″E
- Carries: Fv680
- Crosses: Aursundet
- Locale: Aure Municipality, Norway

Characteristics
- Design: Cantilever bridge
- Total length: 486 metres (1,594 ft)

History
- Opened: 1995

The Aursund Bridge (Norwegian: Aursundbrua) is a cantilever bridge that crosses the Aursundet strait in Aure Municipality in Møre og Romsdal county, Norway. The bridge goes between just north of the village of Aure on the mainland and the island of Ruøya. Along with the Mjosund Bridge, it is part of the road connection between the mainland and the island of Ertvågsøya. The 486-metre (1,594 ft) long Aursund Bridge opened in 1995 and it is built of prestressed concrete.

== See also ==
- List of bridges in Norway
- List of bridges in Norway by length
- List of bridges
- List of bridges by length
