= Nils Ryjord =

Norwegian architect

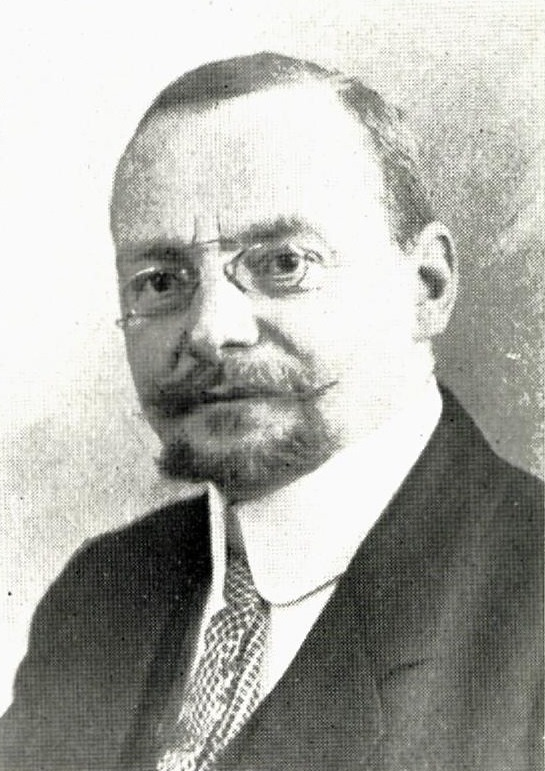
- Born: 16 December 1875; Trondheim, Norway
- Died: 24 January 1926 (aged 50); Trondheim, Norway
- Occupation: Architect
- Projects: Nidaros Cathedral restoration

Nils Ryjord (1875—1926) was a Norwegian architect. He designed several churches, but spent the majority of his career working on the restoration of the historic Nidaros Cathedral.

Ryjord completed his education at the Norwegian Institute of Technology in the spring of 1897. He then worked under Lars Solberg and Johan Christensen for a year. From 1898 onwards, he worked as Christian Christie's assistant at the major restoration project for the Nidaros Cathedral. After Christie's death in 1906, when he even became the temporary leader, cathedral architect, and artistic director until 1909. After Christie's death, an architectural competition was held to determine the person to resume Christie's work. Ryjord lost the competition to Olaf Nordhagen. From 1909 until his death in 1926, Ryjord then became the technical and administrative leader of the project and Olaf Nordhagen took over from Ryjord as the artistic director of the project.

In addition to his work at Nidaros Cathedral, he also prepared plans for the restoration of Austråt, Old Nærøy Church, and Trondenes Church. He also led the excavation at Munkeby Abbey as well as the improvements of Steinvikholm Castle and the Old Sakshaug Church. He also prepared plans for the restoration of Tingvoll Church which began shortly before his death and continued after he died.

Nils Ryjord was the son of Johan Eduard Ryjord and Anna Fredrikke Mørck. On 2 June 1906, he was married to Ingeborg Ragnhild Floan. He was the uncle to Roar Tønseth as well.

== Works ==
Ryjord designed the following buildings:

- Froan Chapel, Frøya Municipality (1903–1904)
- Kvenvær Church, Hitra Municipality (1907–1909)
- Kronprins Olavs allé 19 (Ryjord's home), Trondheim (1909)
- Leiranger Church, Steigen Municipality (1909–1911)
- Aure Church, Aure Municipality (1923–1924)

Ryjord worked on the restorations of the following buildings:

- Logtun Church, Frosta Municipality (1903)
- Steinvikholm Castle, Stjørdal Municipality (1907-1922)
- Old Sakshaug Church, Inderøy Municipality (1908)
- Munkeby Abbey, Skogn Municipality (1909-1910)
- Edøy Church, Smøla Municipality (1910)
- Old Nærøy Church, Nærøy Municipality (1912-1915)
- Halsa Church, Halsa Municipality (1922-1924)
- Tingvoll Church, Tingvoll Municipality (1922-1926)
