= Mellandsvågen Nature Reserve =

Nature reserve in Norway

- Mellandsvågen naturreservat
- IUCN category Ia (strict nature reserve)
- Interactive map of Mellandsvågen Nature Reserve
- Nearest city: Vihalsen
- Coordinates: 63°21′25″N 8°30′0″E
- Area: 95.9 ha (237 acres)
- Established: 1988

Ramsar Wetland
- Official name: Mellandsvågen
- Designated: 18 March 1996
- Reference no.: 808

The Mellandsvågen Nature Reserve (Norwegian: Mellandsvågen naturreservat) is located on the western part of the island of Skardsøya in Aure Municipality in Møre og Romsdal county, Norway. Since 1996, the nature reserve has had the status of a Ramsar site because of its importance for migratory birds.

The area received protection in 1988 "to preserve an important wetland area with its appertaining plant communities, bird life, and other wildlife", according to the conservation regulations. The Mellandsvågen Wildlife Sanctuary (Norwegian: Mellandsvågen dyrefredningsområde), which measures 12.2 square kilometers (4.7 sq mi), was created at the same time as a buffer zone in the land and sea area south and west of the nature reserve. The Mellandsvågen Nature Reserve is bordered to the east by the Melland Nature Reserve, which was established in 2002 and measures 47 hectares (120 acres).

The area consists of the mouth of a fjord, some islands, and a headland. The dominant landscape type is a large, well-developed, and diverse beach meadow community, especially south of Livsneset and around Storholmen. Behind the beach meadows there is damp heath that transitions into a nutrient-poor bog. It has rich and varied vegetation. There are no species on the national red list, but many of them are regionally rare or endangered: herbaceous seepweed (Suaeda maritima), Ray's knotweed (Polygonum oxyspermum subsp. raii), media sandspurry (Spergularia media), and slenderleaf pondweed (Stuckenia filiformis). The area is very important for overwintering waterfowl such as loons, grebes, and ducks.

Amateur ornithologists from Hemne Municipality have been carrying out winter counts of birds in the reserve for several years.
