= Melland Nature Reserve =

Protected area in Norway

- Melland naturreservat
- IUCN category Ia (strict nature reserve)
- Interactive map of Melland Nature Reserve
- Nearest city: Vihalsen
- Coordinates: 63°21′11″N 8°30′56″E
- Area: 46.5 ha (115 acres)
- Established: 2002

Ramsar Wetland
- Official name: Mellandsvågen
- Designated: 18 March 1996
- Reference no.: 808

The Melland Nature Reserve (Norwegian: Melland naturreservat) is located on the western part of the island of Skardsøya in Aure Municipality in Møre og Romsdal county, Norway. The nature reserve has the status of a Ramsar site because of its importance for migratory birds.

The area received protection in 2002 "to preserve an area that encompasses both protected wetlands and coastal areas rich in botanical species", according to the conservation regulations. The Melland Nature Reserve is bordered to the west by the Mellandsvågen Nature Reserve, which was established in 1998 and measures 95.9 hectares (237 acres).

The area consists of a varied stretch of beach with diverse landscape elements. Rocky beaches dominate, but there is also a pebble beach. The bottoms of the shallow coves are covered in silt, sand, and gravel. The area has 78 registered plant species. The beach and shallow basins are important resting, overwintering, and nesting sites for birds.
