= Todalen =

Village in Aure Municipality, Norway

- Village
- Interactive map of Todalen
- Location within Møre og Romsdal Location within Norway
- Coordinates: 63°11′59″N 08°41′06″E
- Country: Norway
- Region: Western Norway
- County: Møre og Romsdal
- District: Nordmøre
- Municipality: Aure Municipality
- Elevation: 10 m (33 ft)
- Time zone: UTC+01:00 (CET)
  - Summer (DST): UTC+02:00 (CEST)
- Post Code: 6690 Aure

Todalen is a village on the north shore of the Vinjefjorden in Aure Municipality in Møre og Romsdal county, Norway. It is located about 15 kilometres (9.3 mi) south of the municipal center of Aure. It is well-known for its festival, Rock mot ras, based on an idea by Kristian Todal.

== History ==
Until the beginning of the 19th century, the village was a local center of government with a lensmann and thing. Todal had a post office until 1956. It also had a steamboat connection to the town of Kristiansund and primary school until 1968.
