= Arasvika =

Village in Aure Municipality, Norway

Arasvika Vågosen
- Village
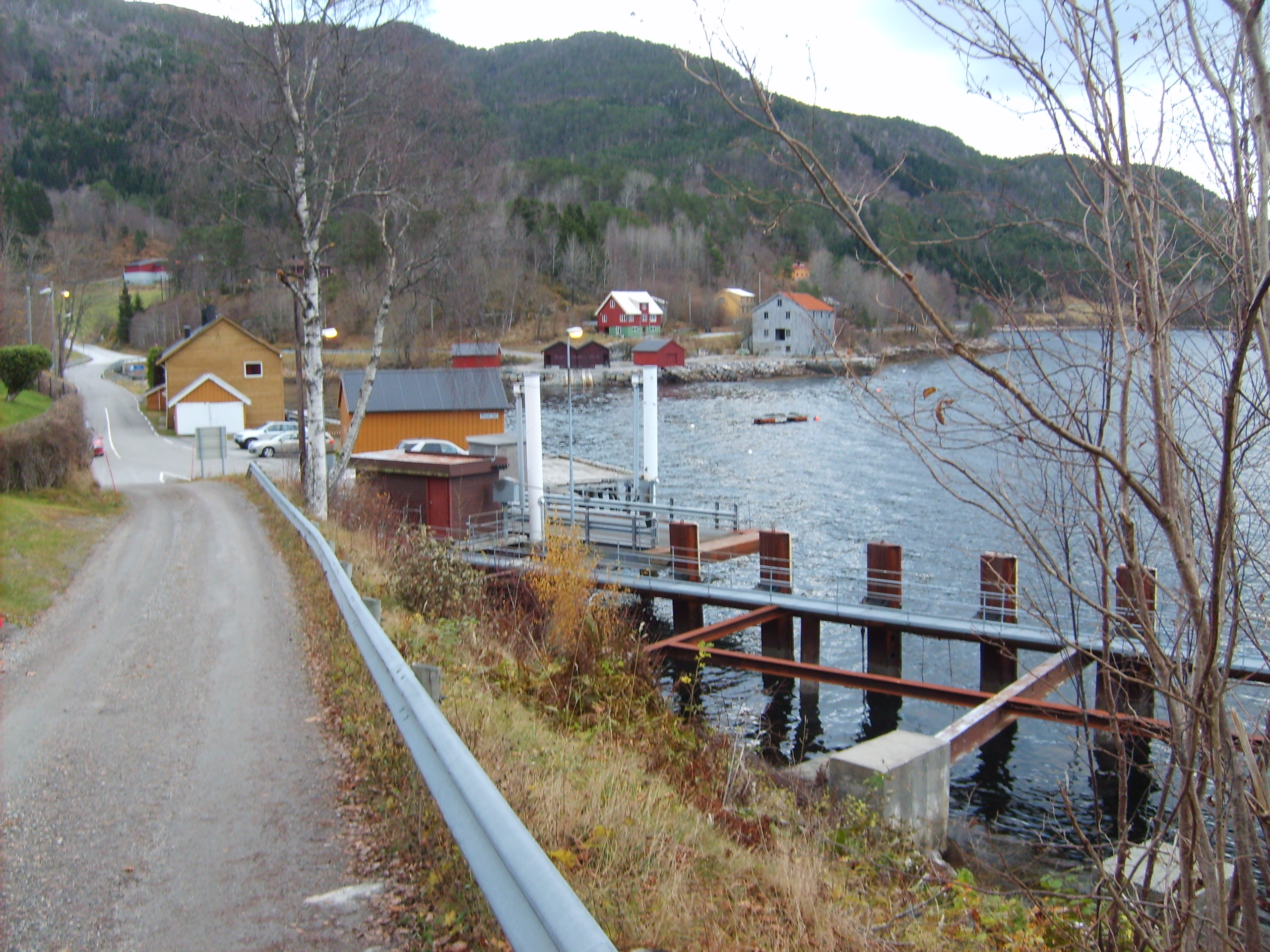
- The ferry dock in Arasvika
- Interactive map of Arasvika
- Location within Møre og Romsdal Location within Norway
- Coordinates: 63°10′3.1″N 8°26′19.9″E
- Country: Norway
- Region: Western Norway
- County: Møre og Romsdal
- District: Nordmøre
- Municipality: Aure Municipality
- Elevation: 64 m (210 ft)
- Time zone: UTC+01:00 (CET)
  - Summer (DST): UTC+02:00 (CEST)
- Post Code: 6694 Foldfjorden

Arasvika or Vågosen is a village and ferry port in Aure Municipality in Møre og Romsdal county, Norway.

== Geography ==
Arasvika lies on the south side of the island of Ertvågsøya along Arasvik Fjord. There are road connections to Arasvika via County Road 682 from the north and County Road 362 from the east. The Arasvika–Hennset Ferry connects the village to Hennset in Heim Municipality and European route E39.

== Name ==
The village is named after the old Arasvik farm (Old Norse: Oraldsvík). The first element is Oraldr which is a historic name of a man. The last element is vík which means "small bay" or "cove". The oldest recorded form of the village's name is Oraldsuik, which appeared in a document from 1342.

== Notable people ==
Notable people that were born or lived in Arasvika include:

- Holger Aresvik (1883–1938), a fiddler and painter
- Oddvar Aresvik (1915–1996), a professor of agricultural economics at the Norwegian College of Agriculture in Ås Municipality
