= Sivert Todal =

Norwegian politician

Sivert Todal (13 September 1902 – 30 September 1988) was a Norwegian politician for the Liberal Party.

Todal was born in Aure Municipality. He was elected to the Norwegian Parliament from Møre og Romsdal in 1958, and was re-elected on one occasion. He was also mayor of Aure Municipality from 1951–1957.
