= Dromnessund Bridge =

Dromnessund Bridge Dromnessundbrua
- Coordinates: 63°21′32″N 8°41′47″E
- Crosses: Dromnessundet
- Locale: Aure Municipality, Norway

Characteristics
- Total length: 388 metres (1,273 ft)

History
- Opened: 1996

The Dromnessund Bridge (Norwegian: Dromnessundbrua) is a bridge that crosses the Dromnessundet strait between the mainland and the island of Skardsøya in Aure Municipality in Møre og Romsdal county, Norway. The 388-metre (1,273 ft) long Dromnessund Bridge opened in 1996.

== See also ==
- List of bridges in Norway
- List of bridges in Norway by length
- List of bridges
- List of bridges by length
