= Sør-Tustna Chapel =

Church in Møre og Romsdal, Norway

- Sør-Tustna kapell
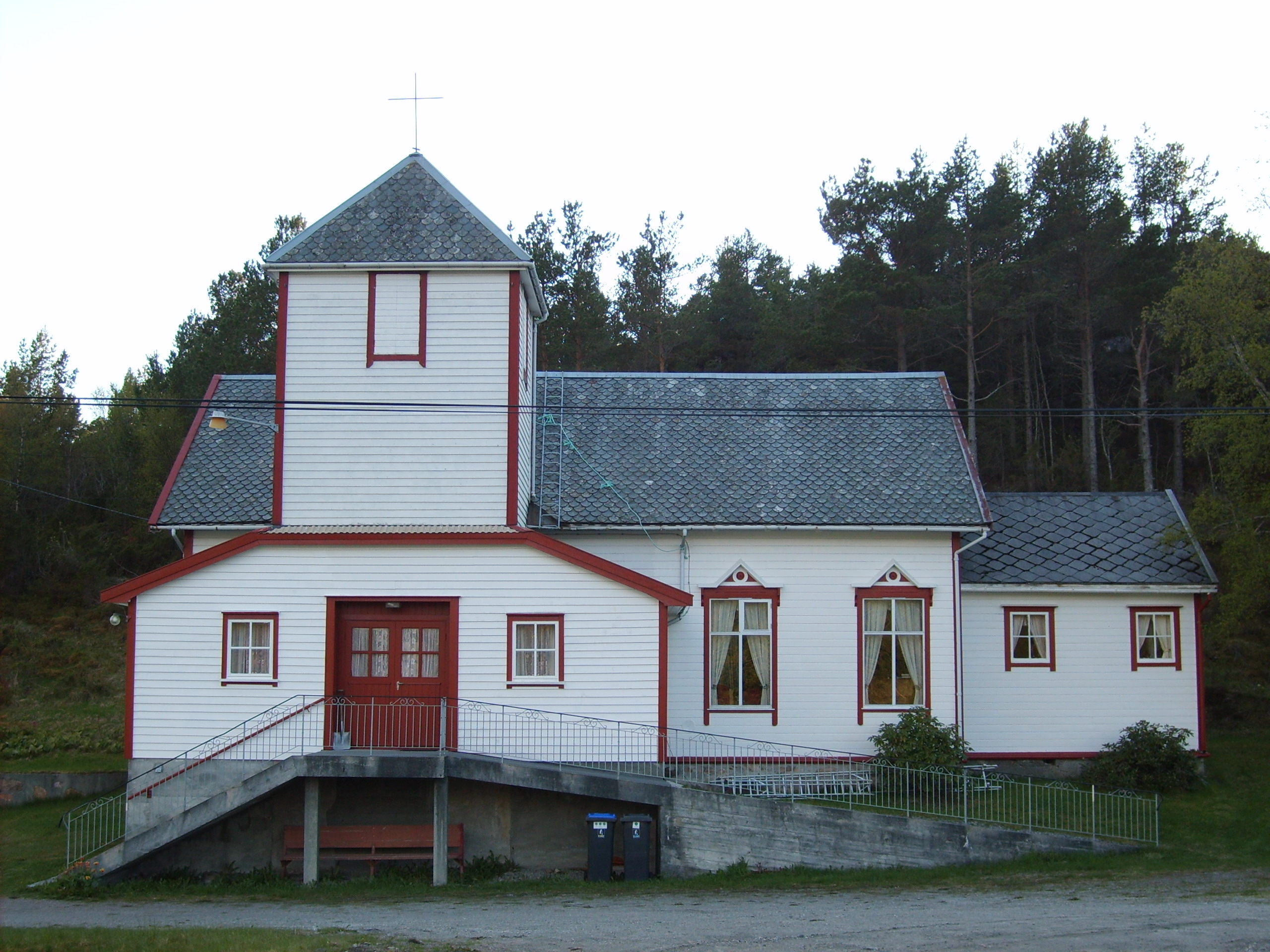
- View of the chapel
- Sør-Tustna Chapel
- 63°09′51″N 7°56′47″E
- Location: Aure Municipality, Møre og Romsdal
- Country: Norway
- Denomination: Church of Norway
- Churchmanship: Evangelical Lutheran

History
- Status: Parish church
- Founded: 1907
- Consecrated: 1952

Architecture
- Functional status: Active
- Architectural type: Long church
- Completed: 1907 (119 years ago)

Specifications
- Capacity: 75
- Materials: Wood

Administration
- Diocese: Møre bispedømme
- Deanery: Ytre Nordmøre prosti
- Parish: Tustna
- Norwegian Cultural Heritage Site
- Type: Church
- Status: Regionally protected
- ID: 85060

Sør-Tustna Chapel (Norwegian: Sør-Tustna kapell) is a chapel of the Church of Norway in Aure Municipality in Møre og Romsdal county, Norway. It is located in the village of Tømmervåg, on the western coast of the island of Tustna. It is an annex chapel in the Tustna parish which is part of the Ytre Nordmøre prosti (deanery) in the Diocese of Møre. This small wooden chapel was built in a long church design in 1907. It has a seating capacity of about 75 people.

== History ==
The small building was first constructed in 1907 as a prayer house for the people of Tømmervåg on the island of Tustna. In 1952, the prayer house was consecrated as an annex chapel for the Tustna parish. The altarpiece was made by Martin Halsby. The pulpit and baptismal font were both added to the building in 1952. There is no cemetery at this chapel.

== See also ==
- List of churches in Møre
