= Skardsøya =

Island in Møre og Romsdal, Norway

- Interactive map of Skardsøya

Geography
- Location: Møre og Romsdal, Norway
- Coordinates: 63.3640°N 8.5658°E
- Area: 52.3 km^{2} (20.2 sq mi)
- Length: 8 km (5 mi)
- Width: 12.5 km (7.77 mi)
- Highest elevation: 390 m (1280 ft)
- Highest point: Bjørnskardliknubben

Administration
- Norway
- County: Møre og Romsdal
- Municipality: Aure Municipality

Demographics
- Population: 332 (2015)

Skardsøya is an island in Aure Municipality in Møre og Romsdal county, Norway. The 52.3-square-kilometre (20.2 sq mi) island is located along the Trondheimsleia strait in the northeastern part of the municipality, just east of the island of Grisvågøya and north and west of the mainland. The island is connected to the mainland to the east by the Dromnessund Bridge and to the south by the Torsetsund Bridge. In 2015, the island had about 332 residents living on it.

The Mellandsvågen Nature Reserve and Melland Nature Reserve are located on the western part of the island.

== See also ==
- List of islands of Norway
