= Ruøya =

Island in Møre og Romsdal, Norway

- Interactive map of Ruøya

Geography
- Location: Møre og Romsdal, Norway
- Coordinates: 63.2675°N 8.4971°E
- Area: 0.78 km^{2} (0.30 sq mi)
- Length: 1.4 km (0.87 mi)
- Width: 800 m (2600 ft)
- Coastline: 6 km (3.7 mi)
- Highest elevation: 89 m (292 ft)

Administration
- Norway
- County: Møre og Romsdal
- Municipality: Aure Municipality

Ruøya is an island in Aure Municipality in Møre og Romsdal county, Norway. It is connected to the village of Aure on the mainland to the east by the Aursund Bridge and to the island of Rottøya to the south by the Smalsund Bridge. The large island of Ertvågsøya lies to the west.

== See also ==
- List of islands of Norway
