= Paul Vighals =

Norwegian sport shooter (1886–1962)

Personal information
- Born: 31 March 1886 Domnessund, Norway
- Died: 1 September 1962 (aged 76) Aure, Norway

Sport
- Sport: Sports shooting

Paul Vighals (31 March 1886 – 1 September 1962) was a Norwegian sport shooter. He was born in Aure Municipality, and his club was Dromnessund Skytterlag. He competed in military rifle and free rifle at the 1912 Summer Olympics in Stockholm.
