= Halsa Church =

Church in Trøndelag, Norway

- Halsa kyrkje
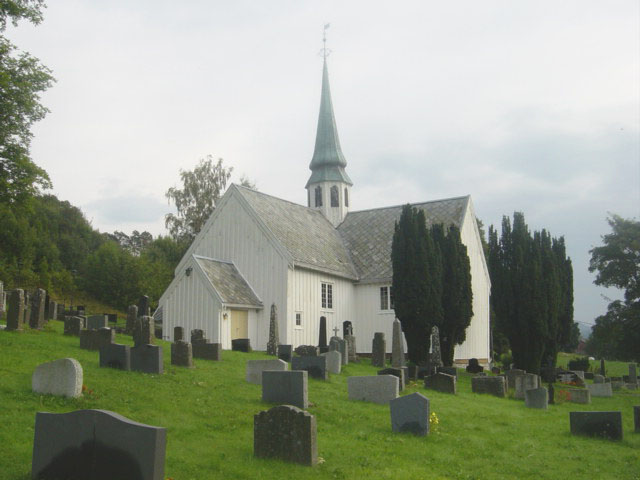
- View of the church
- Halsa Church
- 63.0756978980°N 8.2466757392°E
- Location: Heim Municipality, Trøndelag
- Country: Norway
- Denomination: Church of Norway
- Churchmanship: Evangelical Lutheran

History
- Status: Parish church
- Founded: 12th century
- Consecrated: 5 Aug 1725

Architecture
- Functional status: Active
- Architectural type: Cruciform
- Completed: 1725 (301 years ago)

Specifications
- Capacity: 330
- Materials: Wood

Administration
- Diocese: Nidaros bispedømme
- Deanery: Orkdal prosti
- Parish: Halsa
- Norwegian Cultural Heritage Site
- Type: Church
- Status: Automatically protected
- ID: 84468

Halsa Church (Norwegian: Halsa kyrkje) is a parish church of the Church of Norway in Heim Municipality in Trøndelag county, Norway. It is located in the village of Halsanaustan. The church is accessible from European route E39 via County Road 350. It is one of two churches in the Halsa parish which is part of the Orkdal prosti (deanery) in the Diocese of Nidaros. The white, wooden church was built in a cruciform style in 1724 using plans drawn up by an unknown architect. The church seats about 330 people.

== History ==
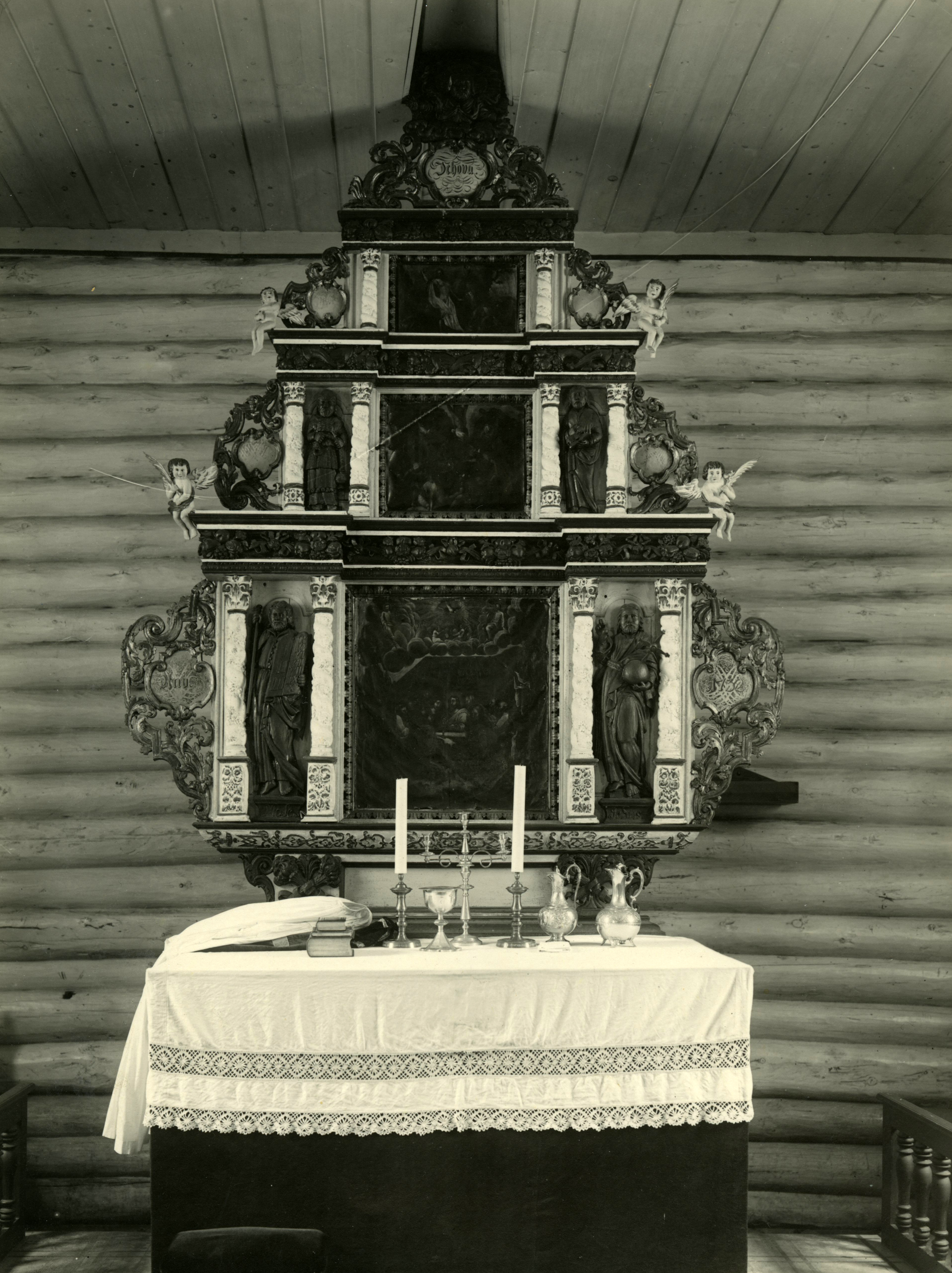
View of the altarpiece

The earliest existing historical records of the church date back to the year 1303, but the church was already built at that time, possibly built in the 1100s. In the mid-1600s, the church was described as a long form stave church with timber-framed transepts that were added later to create a cruciform layout. The building had a small tower on the roof over the chancel. On 9 September 1724, the church was struck by lightning and it burned to the ground. It was quickly rebuilt on the same site the following spring. The new cruciform building was consecrated on 5 August 1725.

The pulpit and altarpiece are from 1725. The altarpiece is painted in oxide green with marble and silver lacquer. It was completed by Peder Knutsen Kjørsvik (1691–1757). The church exterior was painted red around 1860 and then it was painted white in 1863. In 1917, the church was in poor condition, and there was a desire for a new church among the congregation. Olaf Nordhagen and Nils Ryjord were given the task of assessing the condition of the church, and this resulted in a major restoration project that was led by Domenico Erdmann and Ola Seter. The project included (among other things) removing layers of interior paint to reveal the old baroque and rococo decor from the 1751. The work was completed in 1921.

== See also ==
- List of churches in Nidaros
