= Talgsjøen =

Fjord in Møre og Romsdal, Norway

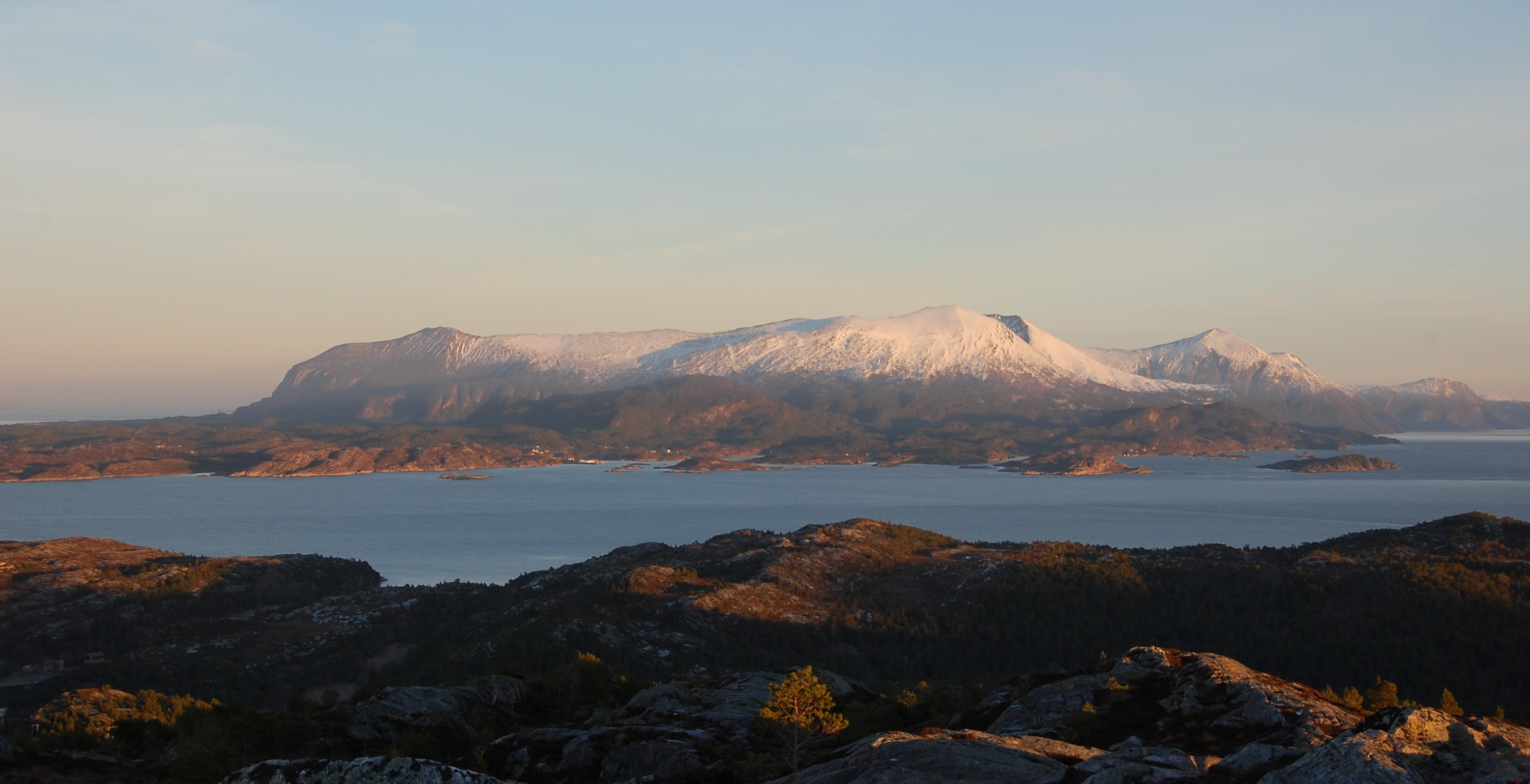
- Talgsjøen seen from Kvernberget in Kristiansund
- Interactive map of the fjord
- Location: Møre og Romsdal county, Norway
- Coordinates: 63.14903°N 7.83962°E
- Type: Fjord
- Basin countries: Norway
- Max. length: 10 kilometres (6.2 mi)
- Max. width: 3 kilometres (1.9 mi)
- Max. depth: 341 metres (1,119 ft)

Talgsjøen is a strait or fjord in Møre og Romsdal county, Norway. The strait is located between the island of Tustna in Aure Municipality in the northeast, several islands in Kristiansund Municipality to the southwest, and the mainland of Tingvoll Municipality in the southeast. The strait connects the Norwegian Sea with the Korsnesfjorden, Halsafjorden, and Freifjorden.

The ferry connection from Seivika on the island of Nordlandet in Kristiansund Municipality and Tømmervåg on the island of Tustna in Aure Municipality crosses Talgsjøen.
