= Aure Church =

Church in Møre og Romsdal, Norway

- Aure kirke
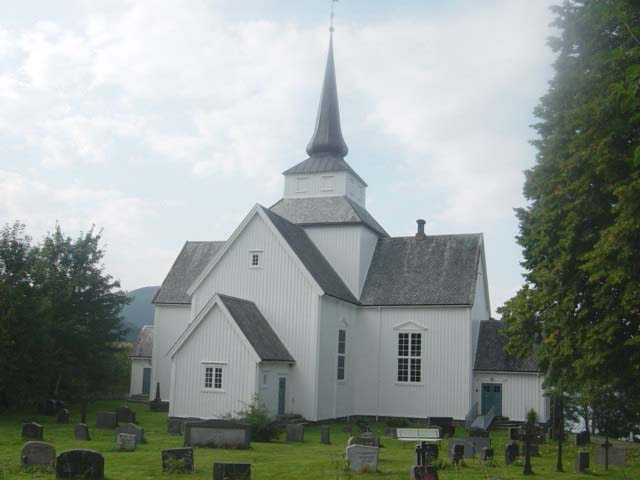
- View of the church
- Aure Church
- 63°15′57″N 8°31′42″E
- Location: Aure Municipality, Møre og Romsdal
- Country: Norway
- Denomination: Church of Norway
- Churchmanship: Evangelical Lutheran

History
- Status: Parish church
- Founded: 10th-century
- Consecrated: 24 October 1924

Architecture
- Functional status: Active
- Architect: Nils Ryjord
- Architectural type: Cruciform
- Completed: 1924 (102 years ago)

Specifications
- Capacity: 800
- Materials: Wood

Administration
- Diocese: Møre bispedømme
- Deanery: Ytre Nordmøre prosti
- Parish: Aure
- Norwegian Cultural Heritage Site
- Type: Church
- Status: Listed
- ID: 83815

Aure Church (Norwegian: Aure kirke) is a parish church of the Church of Norway in Aure Municipality in Møre og Romsdal county, Norway. It is located in the village of Aure. It is the church for the Aure parish which is part of the Ytre Nordmøre prosti (deanery) in the Diocese of Møre. The white, wooden church was built in a cruciform style in 1924 by the architect Nils Ryjord. The church seats about 800 people.

== History ==
The earliest existing historical records of the church date back to the year 1432, but the church was not new that year. The first church in Aure was a wooden stave church on a site about 30 metres (98 ft) northeast of the present-day church site. The church may have been first established here during the 10th century. The first church was dedicated to the Virgin Mary (Sankta Maria kyrkja).

On 8 May 1726, the church was sold to a private landowner during the Norwegian church auction. This was done along with hundreds of other churches that the King of Denmark-Norway sold to help pay off the debts of the Great Northern War. The new church owner immediately decided to tear down the old church building and replace it with a new church on the same site. This new church was a timber-framed, cruciform design. It was completed in 1726–1727, but the records show that it took some time after that before all of the interior furnishings were completed.

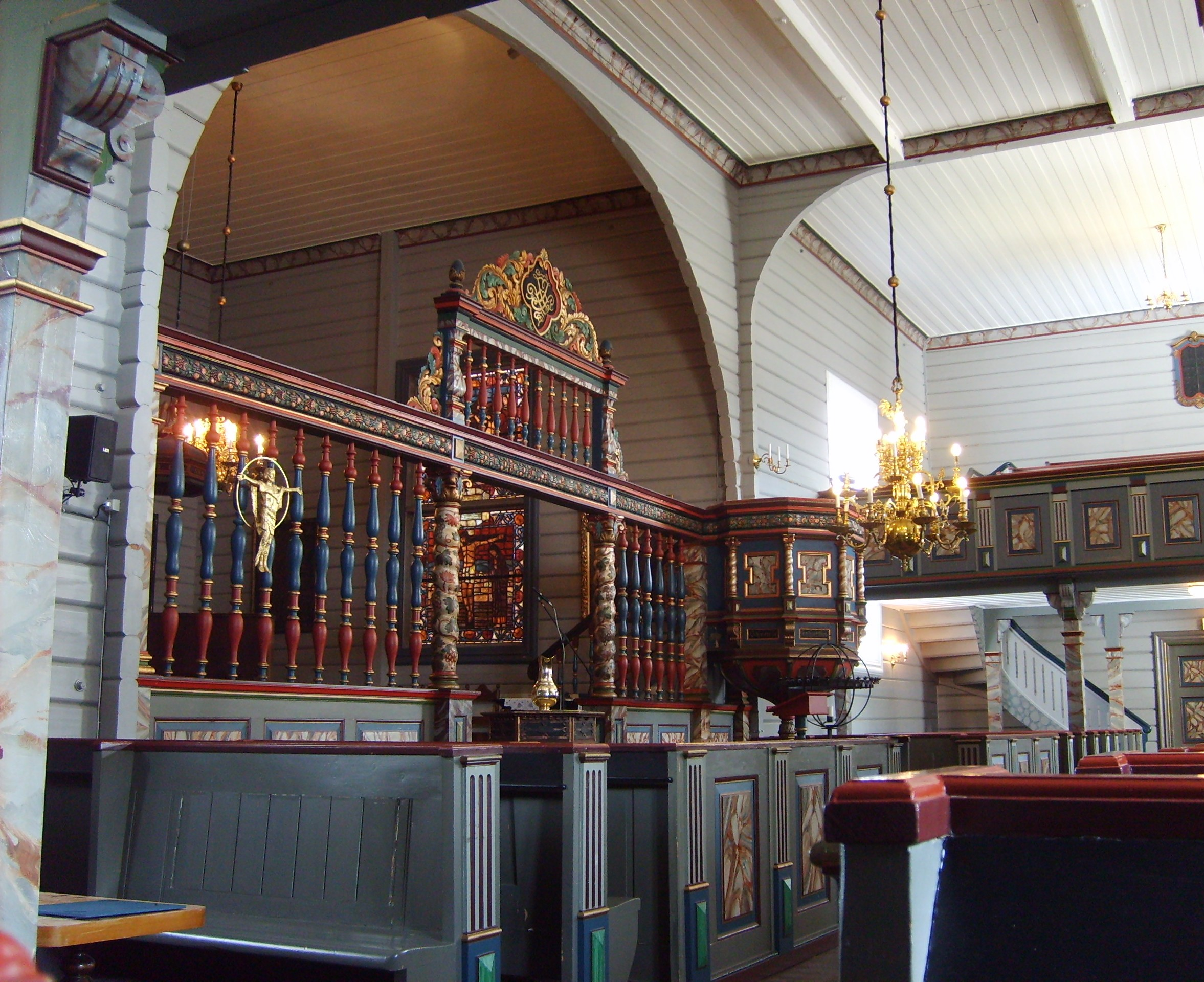
View of the interior of the church

In 1814, this church served as an election church (Norwegian: valgkirke). Together with more than 300 other parish churches across Norway, it was a polling station for elections to the 1814 Norwegian Constituent Assembly which wrote the Constitution of Norway. This was Norway's first national elections. Each church parish was a constituency that elected people called "electors" who later met together in each county to elect the representatives for the assembly that was to meet at Eidsvoll Manor later that year.

In 1850, the church tower was taken down and rebuilt. In 1861–1864, the church was extensively restored on the inside to modernize the church and make room for more people to sit when they attended services there. During this renovation, it was discovered that the building could not withstand the weight of the new tower from 1850, so additional supports had to be added to the building. The church was later sold out of private ownership to the parish.

On 21 January 1923, the church burned down after being struck by lightning. Some of the historic items from the church were rescued from the building during the fire including the altarpiece and baptismal font. Planning for a replacement church began immediately. It was decided to build the new church about 30 metres (98 ft) to the southwest of the old church site. The new church was designed by Nils Ryjord and built in 1924. The new church was designed to be fairly similar to the previous church. It was consecrated on 24 October 1924.

== See also ==
- List of churches in Møre
