= Hennset =

Village in Heim Municipality, Norway

- Village
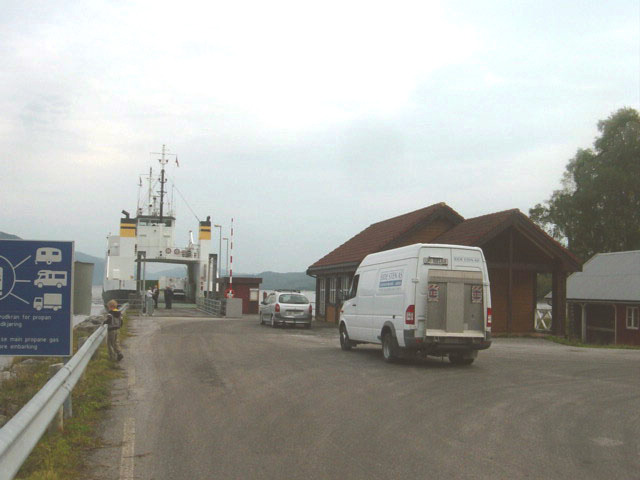
- The ferry dock in Hennset
- Interactive map of Hennset
- Location within Trøndelag Location within Norway
- Coordinates: 63°8′9.2″N 08°26′12.5″E
- Country: Norway
- Region: Western Norway
- County: Trøndelag
- Municipality: Heim Municipality
- Elevation: 23 m (75 ft)
- Time zone: UTC+01:00 (CET)
  - Summer (DST): UTC+02:00 (CEST)
- Post Code: 6687 Valsøyfjord

Hennset is a village and ferry point in Heim Municipality in Trøndelag county, Norway. It lies along Arasvik Fjord between the villages of Liabøen and Valsøyfjord next to European route E39. The ferry connects the village to Arasvika in Aure Municipality and County Road 682.
