= Gullstein Church =

Church in Møre og Romsdal, Norway

- Gullstein kirke
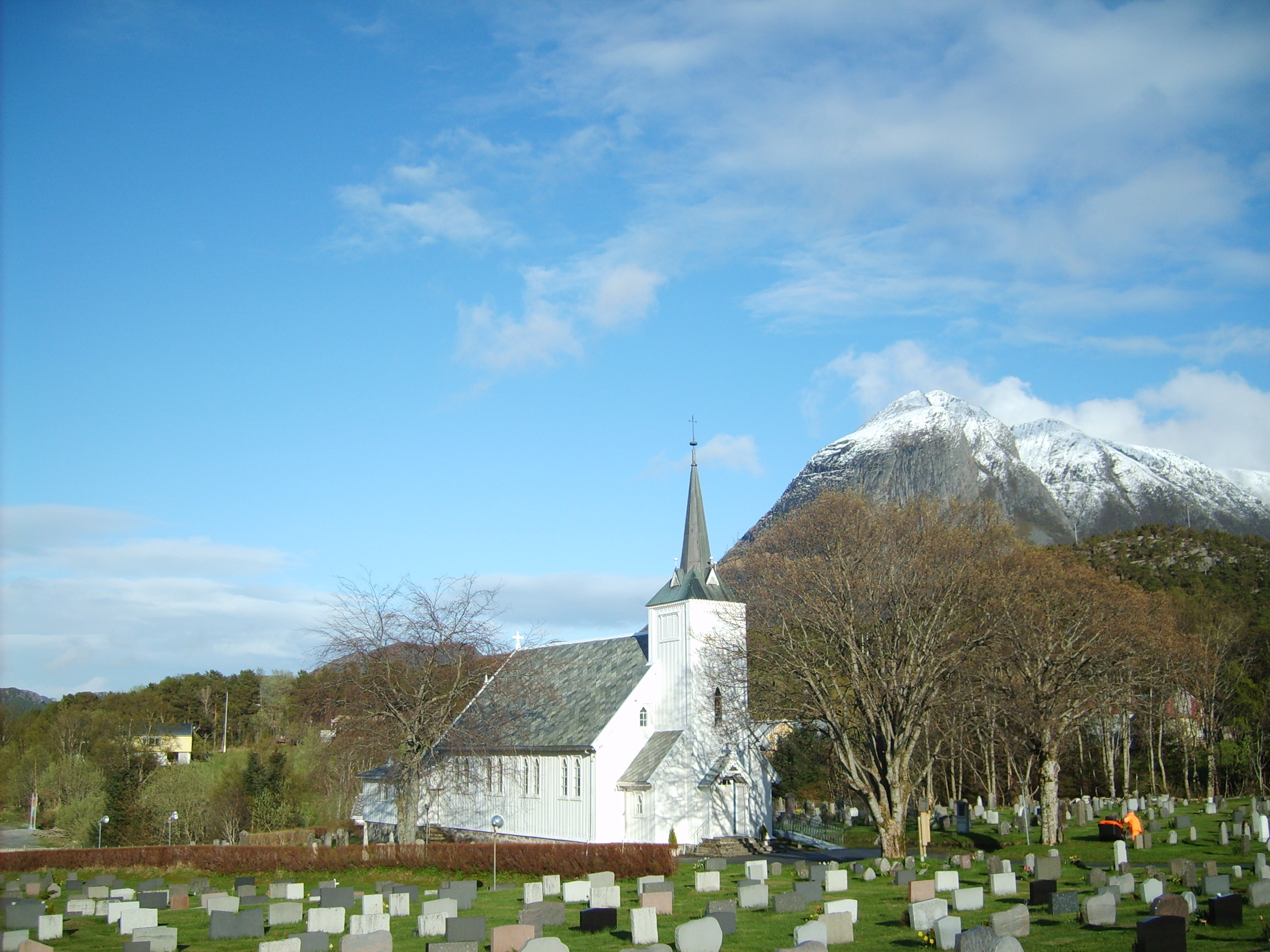
- View of the church
- Gullstein Church
- 63°12′20″N 8°09′09″E
- Location: Aure Municipality, Møre og Romsdal
- Country: Norway
- Denomination: Church of Norway
- Churchmanship: Evangelical Lutheran

History
- Status: Parish church
- Founded: 1869
- Consecrated: 21 Nov 1869

Architecture
- Functional status: Active
- Architect: Christian Christie
- Architectural type: Long church
- Completed: 1869 (157 years ago)

Specifications
- Capacity: 300
- Materials: Wood

Administration
- Diocese: Møre bispedømme
- Deanery: Ytre Nordmøre prosti
- Parish: Tustna
- Norwegian Cultural Heritage Site
- Type: Church
- Status: Listed
- ID: 84448

Gullstein Church (Norwegian: Gullstein kirke) is a parish church of the Church of Norway in Aure Municipality in Møre og Romsdal county, Norway. It is located in the village of Gullstein, on the western coast of the island of Tustna. It is the main church for the Tustna parish which is part of the Ytre Nordmøre prosti (deanery) in the Diocese of Møre. The white, wooden church was built in a long church design in 1869 by the architect Christian Christie. The church seats about 300 people.

== History ==
Historically, the island of Tustna was part of the Edøy Church parish. The church was located across the 5-kilometre (3.1 mi) wide Edøyfjorden. This was sometimes a very difficult journey for the people of Tustna to get to church. During the 1850s, it is said that a total of 20 people died while crossing the fjord to go to church. In 1860, the people of the island of Tustna petitioned for their own church on the island. The formalities of approvals, planning, and construction took nearly ten years to complete, but the church was finally completed in 1869. It was designed by Christian Christie and built in the village of Gullstein on the east coast of the island. The new church was consecrated on 21 November 1869. The wooden long church has a tower on the west end and a sacristy on the north side of the chancel which sits on the east end.

== See also ==
- List of churches in Møre
