= Solskjelsøya =

Island in Møre og Romsdal, Norway

Solskjelsøya Solskjel
- Interactive map of Solskjelsøya; Solskjel

Geography
- Location: Møre og Romsdal, Norway
- Coordinates: 63.2445°N 8.1886°E
- Area: 5 km^{2} (1.9 sq mi)
- Length: 3 km (1.9 mi)
- Width: 2.5 km (1.55 mi)
- Coastline: 15 km (9.3 mi)
- Highest elevation: 87 m (285 ft)
- Highest point: Storhaugen

Administration
- Norway
- County: Møre og Romsdal
- Municipality: Aure Municipality

Solskjelsøya is an island in Aure Municipality in Møre og Romsdal county, Norway. The 5-square-kilometre (1.9 sq mi) island sits just north of the island of Stabblandet, northeast of the larger island of Tustna and west of the island of Ertvågsøya.

There is no road connection to the island, but there is a cable ferry connection across the 450-metre (1,480 ft) wide Norheimsundet strait to the neighboring island of Stabblandet. The cable ferry began operating on 16 January 2009.

The main village on the island is known as Solskjel, so the island is sometimes referred to by that name.

== See also ==
- List of islands of Norway
