= Rottøya =

Island in Møre og Romsdal, Norway

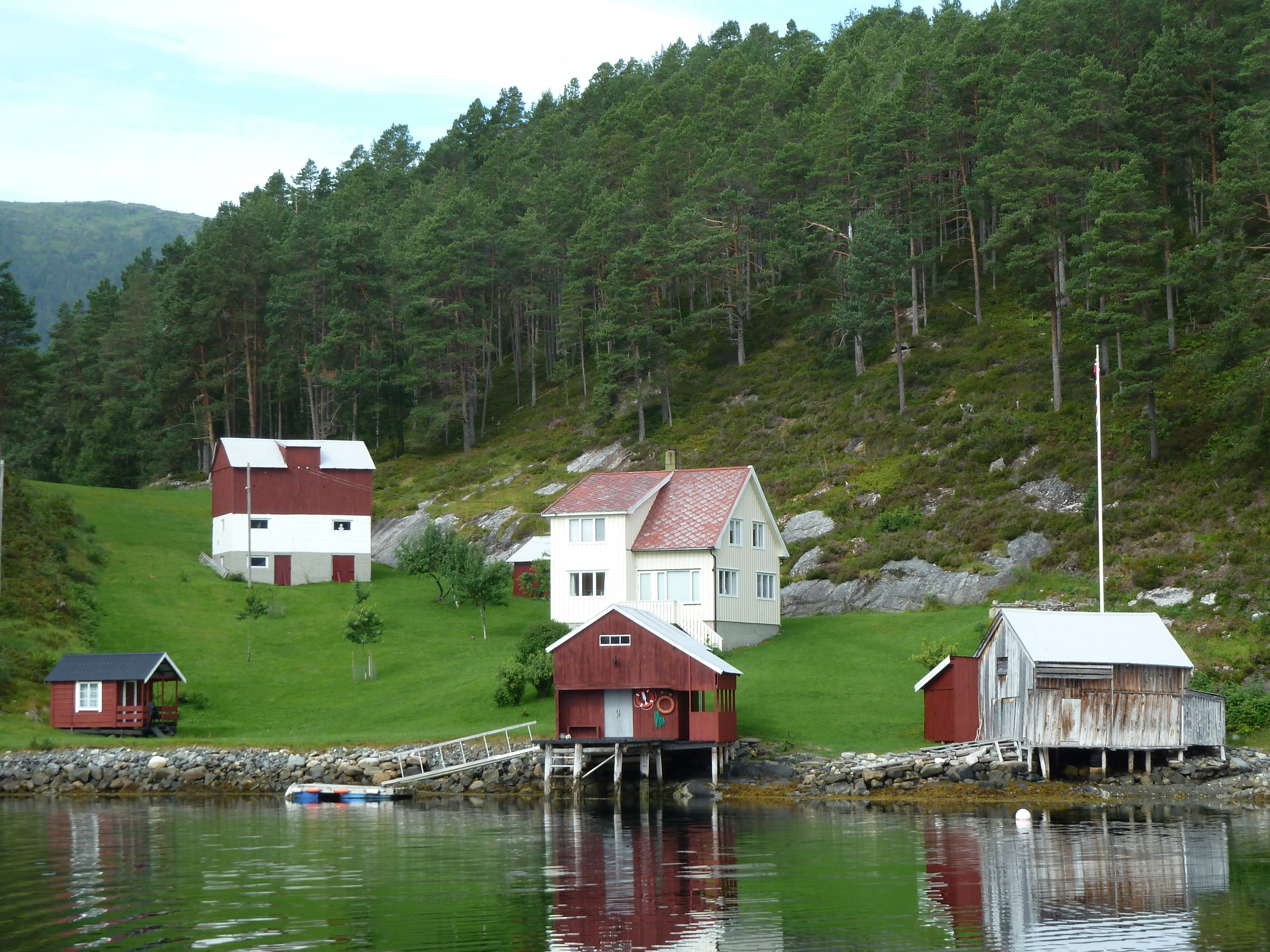
- View of Kalvik on the island
- Interactive map of Rottøya

Geography
- Location: Møre og Romsdal, Norway
- Coordinates: 63.2449°N 8.5090°E
- Area: 4 km^{2} (1.5 sq mi)
- Length: 3.7 km (2.3 mi)
- Width: 1.6 km (0.99 mi)
- Coastline: 10 km (6 mi)
- Highest elevation: 225 m (738 ft)
- Highest point: Rottøyhaugen

Administration
- Norway
- County: Møre og Romsdal
- Municipality: Aure Municipality

Rottøya is an island in Aure Municipality in Møre og Romsdal county, Norway. The island lies between the mainland and the large island of Ertvågsøya. The small island of Ruøya lies just to the north of Rottøya.

The Mjosund Bridge crosses the Mjosundet strait, connecting Rottøya to the island of Ertvågsøya to the west. The Smalsund Bridge crosses the Smalsundet strait, connecting Rottøya to the island of Ruøya to the north. The larger Aursundet strait is located to the east of the island.
