= Norwegian County Road 362 =

Norwegian County Road 362 is the name of several county roads in Norway.

- Norwegian County Road 362 (Finnmark), a county road in Finnmark county, Norway
- Norwegian County Road 362 (Møre og Romsdal), a county road in Møre og Romsdal county, Norway
- Norwegian County Road 362 (Sogn og Fjordane), a county road in Sogn og Fjordane county, Norway
- Norwegian County Road 362 (Telemark), a county road in Telemark county, Norway
- Norwegian County Road 362 (Troms), a county road in Troms county, Norway
