= Mjosund Bridge =

Mjosund Bridge Mjosundbrua
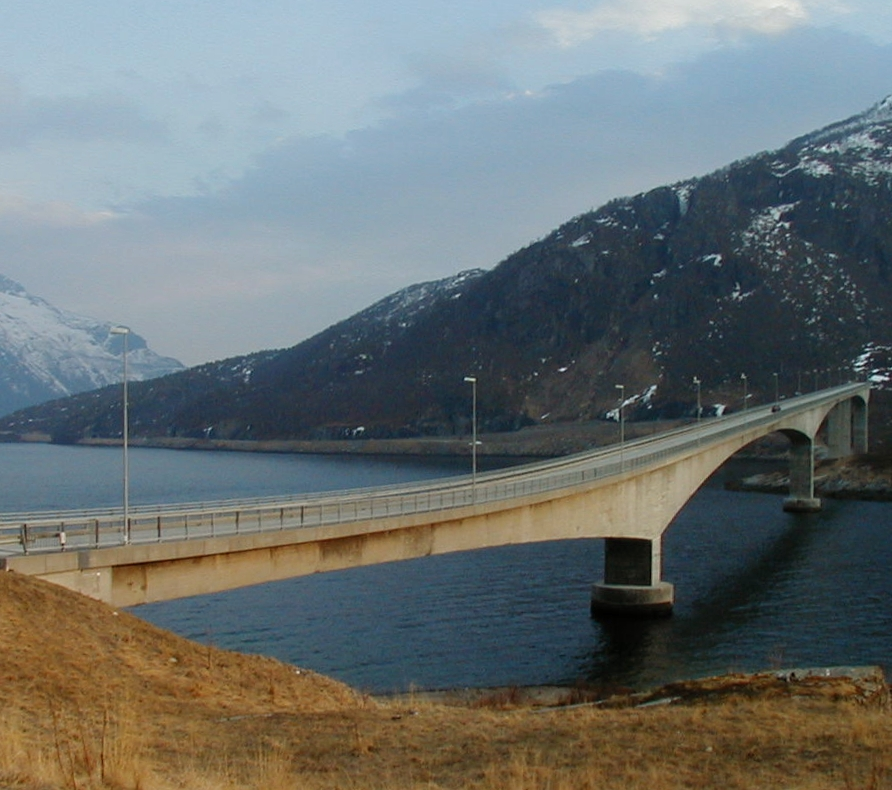
- View of the bridge
- Coordinates: 63°15′00″N 8°28′49″E
- Carries: Fv680
- Crosses: Mjosundet
- Locale: Aure Municipality, Norway

Characteristics
- Design: Cantilever bridge
- Total length: 346 metres (1,135 ft)

History
- Opened: 1995

The Mjosund Bridge (Norwegian: Mjosundbrua) is a cantilever bridge that crosses the Mjosundet strait between the islands of Rottøya and Ertvågsøya in Aure Municipality in Møre og Romsdal county, Norway. Along with the Aursund Bridge, it is part of the road connection between the mainland and Ertvågsøya. Mjosund Bridge is 346 metres (1,135 ft) long and opened in 1995.

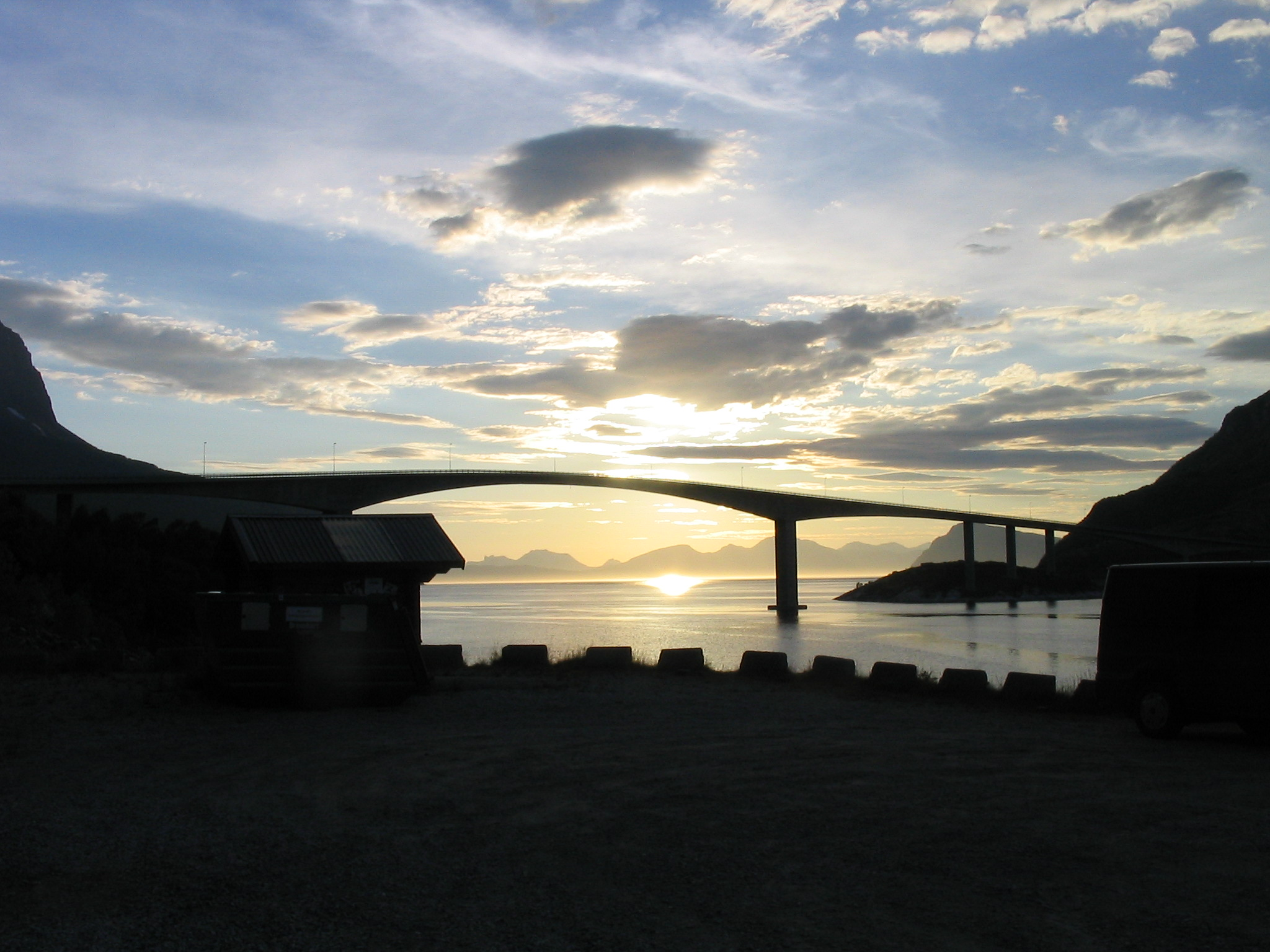
The Mjosund Bridge

== See also ==
- List of bridges in Norway
- List of bridges in Norway by length
- List of bridges
- List of bridges by length
