= Stabblandet =

Island in Møre og Romsdal, Norway

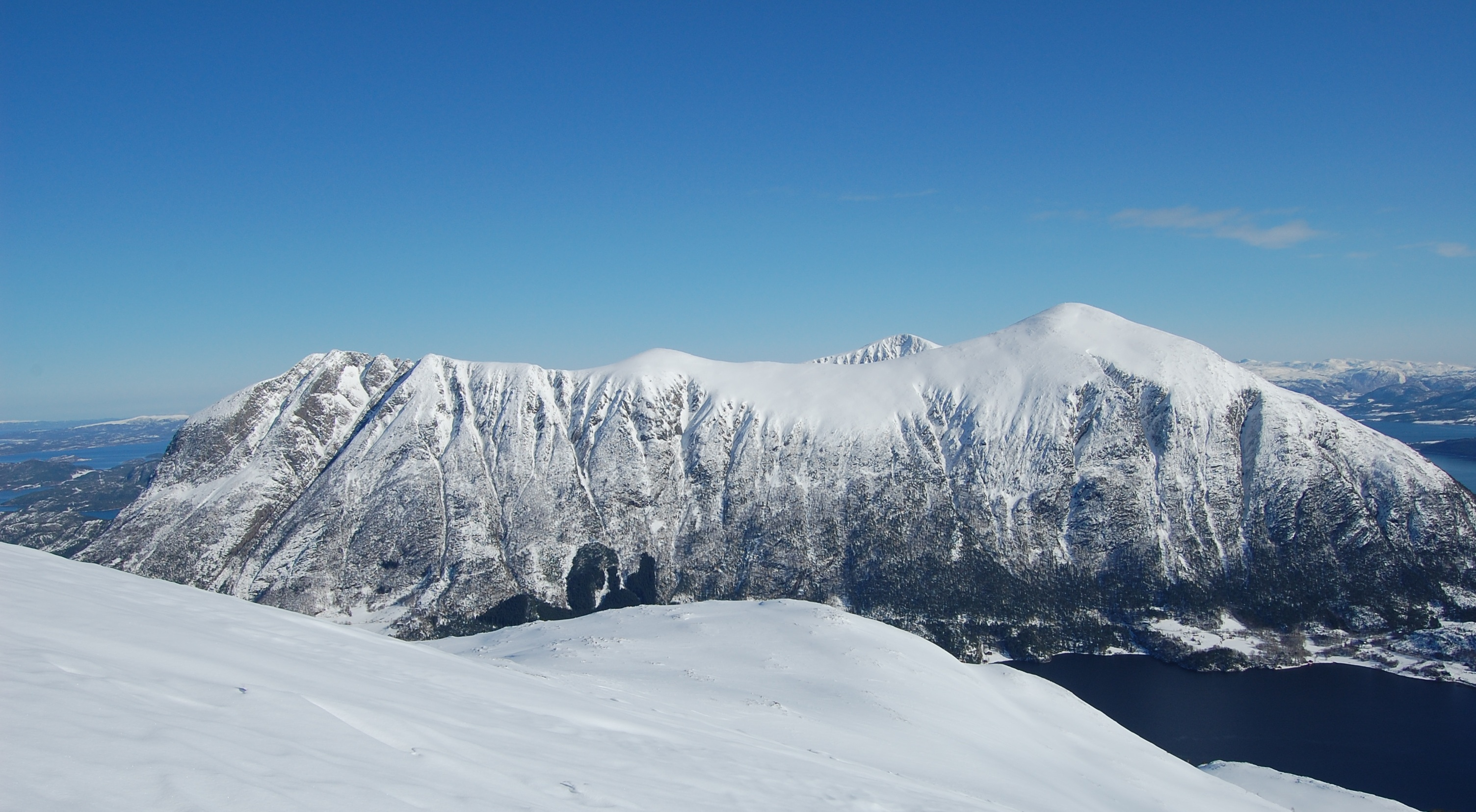
- View of the island's large mountains.
- Interactive map of Stabblandet

Geography
- Location: Møre og Romsdal, Norway
- Coordinates: 63.1959°N 8.2074°E
- Area: 36.6 km^{2} (14.1 sq mi)
- Length: 7.5 km (4.66 mi)
- Width: 6.4 km (3.98 mi)
- Highest elevation: 908 m (2979 ft)
- Highest point: Innerbergsalen

Administration
- Norway
- County: Møre og Romsdal
- Municipality: Aure Municipality

Demographics
- Population: 121 (2015)

Stabblandet is an island in Aure Municipality in Møre og Romsdal county, Norway. The 36.6-square-kilometre (14.1 sq mi) island lies to the west of the island of Ertvågsøya, south of the smaller island of Solskjelsøya, east of the large island of Tustna, and north of the mainland of Heim Municipality. The highest point on the island is the 908-metre (2,979 ft) tall mountain Innerbergsalen.

In 2015, there were 121 residents living on the island. Most of the population lives on the northern part of the island.

== See also ==
- List of islands of Norway
