= Tømmervåg =

Village in Aure Municipality, Norway

- Village
- Interactive map of Tømmervåg
- Location within Møre og Romsdal Location within Norway
- Coordinates: 63°09′26″N 07°57′15″E
- Country: Norway
- Region: Western Norway
- County: Møre og Romsdal
- District: Nordmøre
- Municipality: Aure Municipality
- Elevation: 7 m (23 ft)
- Time zone: UTC+01:00 (CET)
  - Summer (DST): UTC+02:00 (CEST)
- Post Code: 6590 Tustna

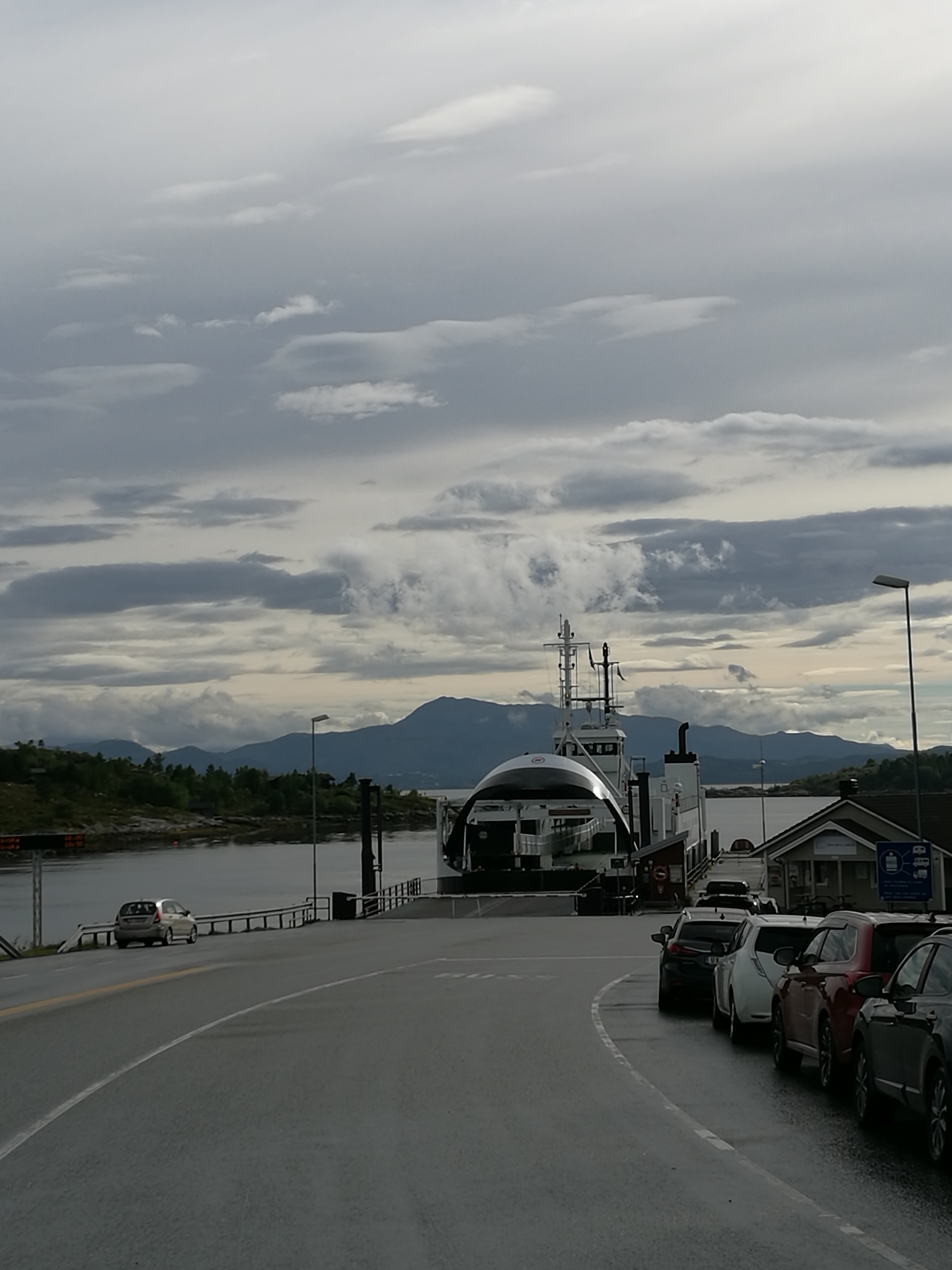
The ferry quay (ferjekai) in Tømmervåg on the island of Tustna, serving the Seivika–Tømmervåg route across Talgsjøen on Fylkesvei 680

Tømmervåg is a village in Aure Municipality in Møre og Romsdal county, Norway. The village is located on the western coast of the island of Tustna, about 10 kilometres (6.2 mi) northeast of the town of Kristiansund. The village of Tømmervåg is the site of the Sør-Tustna Chapel.

The Seivika–Tømmervåg Ferry (part of County Road 680) runs from Tømmervåg across the Talgsjø strait to Seivika on the island of Nordlandet in Kristiansund Municipality.
