= Tustna (island) =

Island in Møre og Romsdal, Norway

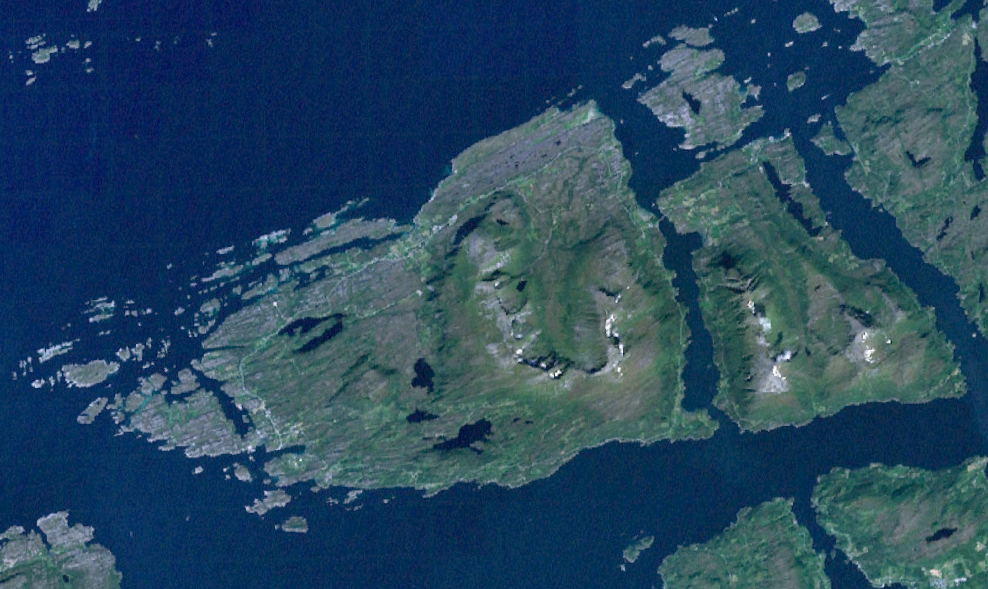
- Interactive map of Tustna

Geography
- Location: Møre og Romsdal, Norway
- Coordinates: 63.1617°N 8.1092°E
- Area: 87.5 km^{2} (33.8 sq mi)
- Length: 13 km (8.1 mi)
- Width: 9 km (5.6 mi)
- Highest elevation: 896 m (2940 ft)
- Highest point: Skarven

Administration
- Norway
- County: Møre og Romsdal
- Municipality: Aure Municipality

Demographics
- Population: 822 (2015)

Tustna is an island in Aure Municipality in Møre og Romsdal county, Norway. The 87.5-square-kilometre (33.8 sq mi) island lies in the western part of the municipality. The island of Tustna lies west of the islands of Stabblandet and Solskjelsøya; to the northeast of the islands of Frei and Nordlandet; and south of the island of Smøla. The Edøyfjorden runs along the northern shores of the island, the Vinjefjorden (and Halsafjorden) are to the south, the Freifjorden is to the southwest, the Talgsjøen is to the west, and the open Norwegian Sea is to the northwest.

The island of Tustna and surrounding islands was part of the old Tustna Municipality from 1 January 1874 until 1 January 2006, when it was merged into Aure Municipality. The main population centers on the island are Tømmervåg on the western coast, Leira on the northern coast, and Gullstein on the eastern coast. The island is connected to the neighboring island of Stabblandet in the east by a bridge at the village of Tustna, and there is a ferry connection from Tømmervåg across the Talgsjø channel to the town of Kristiansund. There is another ferry connection from the northern coast of Tustna to the island of Edøya in Smøla Municipality.

In 2015, the island had 822 residents living on it.

== Name ==
The island is named Tustna (the Old Norse form of the name may have been Old Norse: Þust). The name of the island was mentioned in historical records, as Toester, on a Dutch map from 1623. The name may be derived from the word ðústr which means "staff" or "walking stick". They could be referring to the form of one of the mountains on the island. Historically, the name was spelled Tusteren. On 3 November 1917, a royal resolution changed the spelling of the name of the island (and municipality) to Tustna.

== See also ==
- List of islands of Norway
