= Arasvikfjorden =

Fjord in Trøndelag and Møre og Romsdal counties, Norway

- Aresvikfjorden
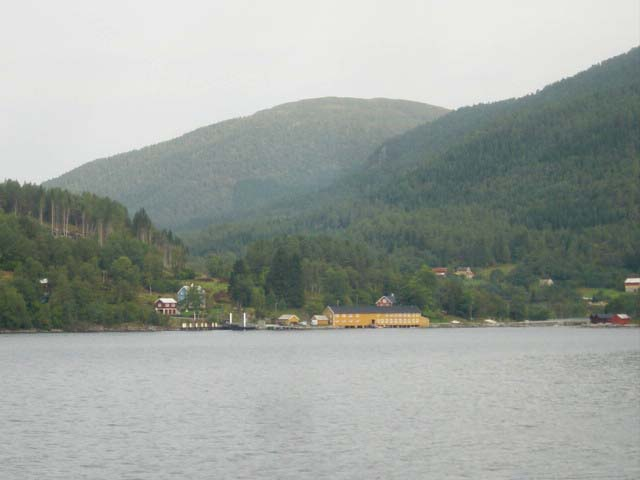
- View of the fjord at Vågosen
- Interactive map of the fjord
- Location: Trøndelag and Møre og Romsdal counties, Norway
- Coordinates: 63°09′13″N 8°27′04″E
- Type: Fjord
- Basin countries: Norway
- Max. length: 12 kilometres (7.5 mi)

Arasvikfjorden (English: Arasvik Fjord) is a fjord on the border of Møre og Romsdal and Trøndelag counties in Norway. The fjord is located between Aure Municipality (in Møre og Romsdal) and Heim Municipality (in Trøndelag). The fjord is part of the larger Vinjefjorden, near where the Valsøyfjorden branches off to the south. European route E39 runs along the south shore of the fjord, through the village of Valsøyfjord. The ferry from Hennset to Arasvika crosses the fjord. The Arasvikfjorden is known for its fishery of cod, coalfish, pollock, mackerel, common ling, tusk, and several types of flatfish.

It was in the Arasvikfjord that the famous killer whale Keiko, from the movie Free Willy, spent his final days.

== See also ==
- List of Norwegian fjords
