= Ertvågsøya =

Island in Møre og Romsdal, Norway

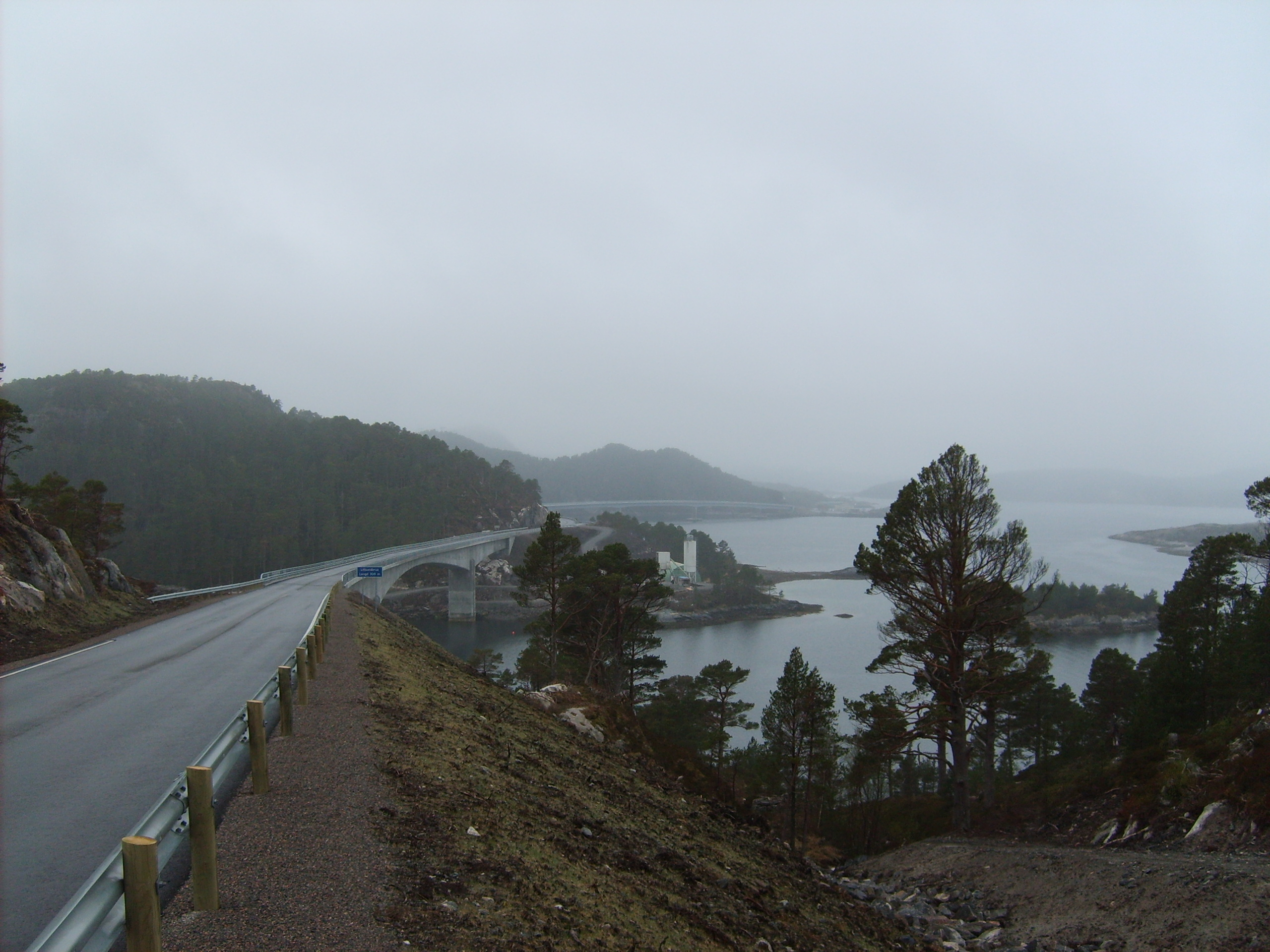
- View of the coastline of the island
- Interactive map of Ertvågsøya

Geography
- Location: Møre og Romsdal, Norway
- Coordinates: 63.1649°N 8.3640°E
- Area: 139.7 km^{2} (53.9 sq mi)
- Length: 15 km (9.3 mi)
- Width: 12 km (7.5 mi)
- Highest elevation: 694 m (2277 ft)
- Highest point: Korsbekkfjellet

Administration
- Norway
- County: Møre og Romsdal
- Municipality: Aure Municipality

Demographics
- Population: 672 (2015)
- Pop. density: 4.8/km^{2} (12.4/sq mi)

Ertvågsøya is an island in Aure Municipality in Møre og Romsdal county, Norway. The island has an area of 139.7 square kilometres (53.9 sq mi) and the highest point is the 694-metre (2,277 ft) tall Korsbekkfjellet. The small islands of Rottøya and Ruøya lie to the east of the island and the islands of Solskjelsøya and Stabblandet lie to the west. The Arasvikfjorden strait runs along the south side of the island and the Gjerdevika, an arm of the Edøyfjorden passes along the north side of the island. The island is nearly bisected by the Foldfjorden, a narrow bay reaching 7 kilometres (4.3 mi) south into the central part of the island.

The island is connected to the mainland by the Mjosund Bridge and Aursund Bridge. In 2015, there were 672 residents living on the island.

== See also ==
- List of islands of Norway
