= Aure Municipality =

Municipality in Møre og Romsdal, Norway

Aure Municipality Aure kommune
- Municipality
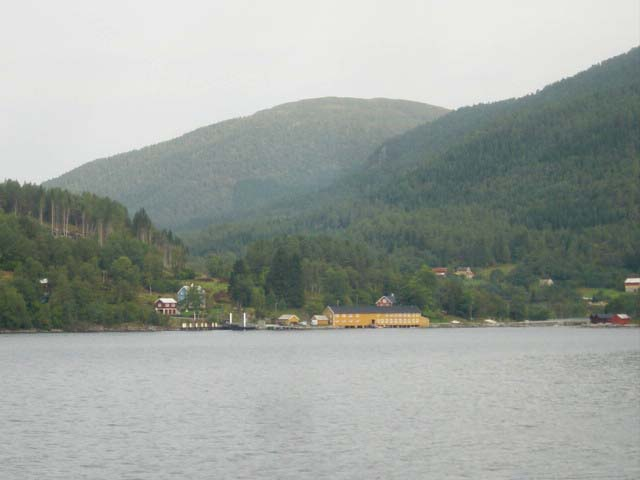
- View of Arasvika in Aure

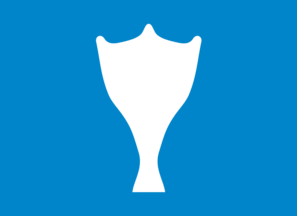
- Flag Coat of arms

- Møre og Romsdal within Norway

- Aure within Møre og Romsdal
- Coordinates: 63°16′07″N 08°36′28″E
- Country: Norway
- County: Møre og Romsdal
- District: Nordmøre
- Established: 1 Jan 1838
  - Created as: Formannskapsdistrikt
- Administrative centre: Aure

Government
  - Mayor (2019): Hanne Berit Brekken (Ap)

Area
  - Total: 641.28 km^{2} (247.60 sq mi)
  - Land: 621.52 km^{2} (239.97 sq mi)
  - Water: 19.76 km^{2} (7.63 sq mi) 3.1%
  - Rank: #179 in Norway
- Highest elevation: 907.81 m (2,978.4 ft)

Population (2024)
  - Total: 3,408
  - Rank: #218 in Norway
  - Density: 5.3/km^{2} (14/sq mi)
  - Change (10 years): ▼ −4.7%
- Demonym: Aurgjelding

Official language
  - Norwegian form: Neutral
- Time zone: UTC+01:00 (CET)
  - Summer (DST): UTC+02:00 (CEST)
- ISO 3166 code: NO-1576
- Website: Official website

Aure is a municipality in Møre og Romsdal county, Norway. It is part of the region of Nordmøre. The administrative centre is the village of Aure. Other villages in Aure include Gullstein, Stemshaug, Todalen, Tjeldbergodden, Arasvika, Vågosen, and Tømmervåg. Aure has one of the largest wooden churches in Norway, Aure Church.

The 641-square-kilometre (247 sq mi) municipality is the 179th largest by area out of the 357 municipalities in Norway. Aure Municipality is the 218th most populous municipality in Norway with a population of 3,408. The municipality's population density is 5.3 inhabitants per square kilometre (14/sq mi) and its population has decreased by 4.7% over the previous 10-year period.

== General information ==
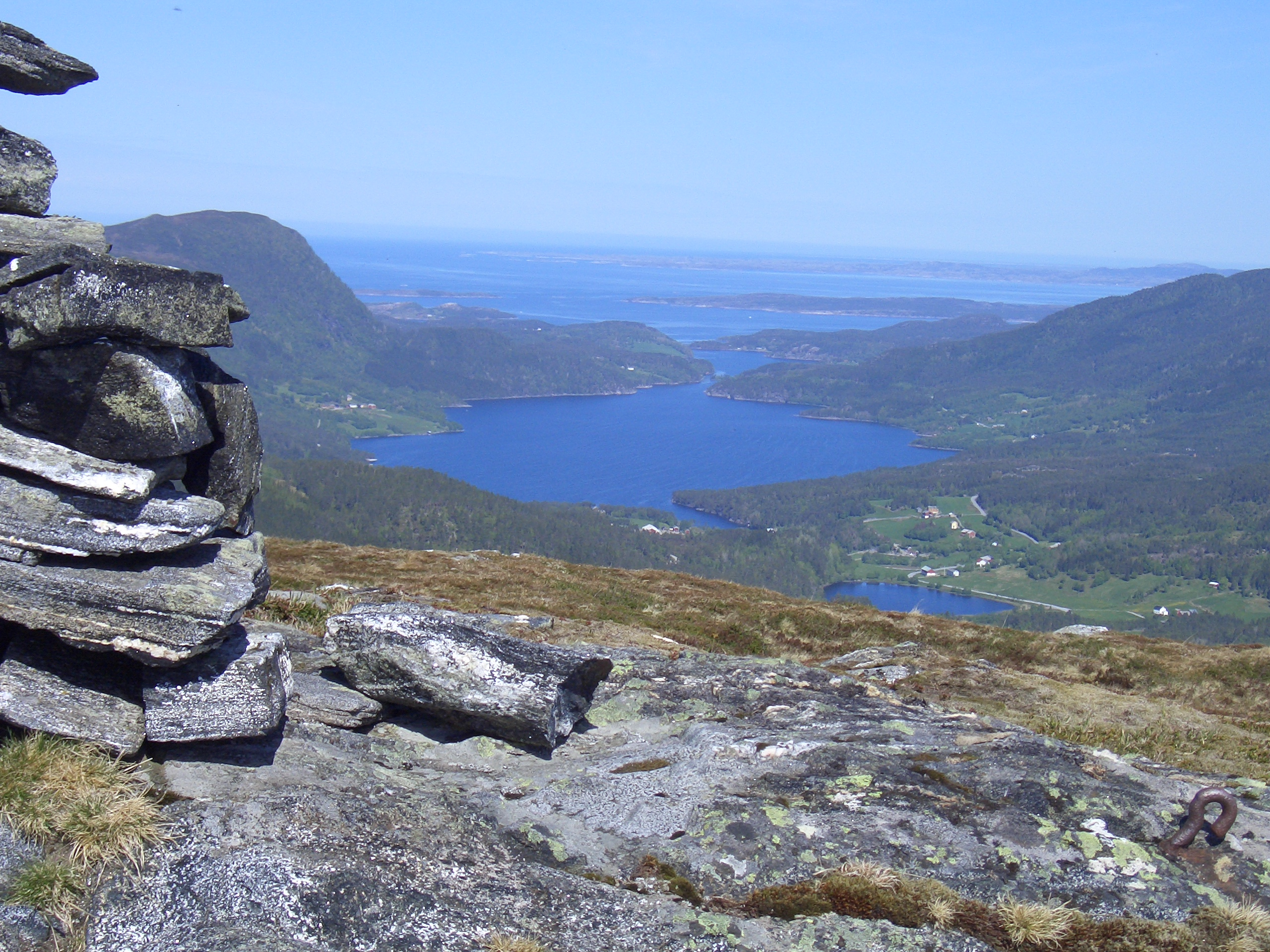
View of the Foldfjord

The municipality was established on 1 January 1838 (see formannskapsdistrikt law). On 1 January 1894, the southern district of Aure (population: 942) was separated to form the new Valsøyfjord Municipality. Then on 1 July 1914, the northeastern district of Aure (population: 851) was separated to form the new Stemshaug Municipality.

During the 1960s, there were many municipal mergers across Norway due to the work of the Schei Committee. On 1 January 1965, Stemshaug Municipality (population: 877), the part of Valsøyfjord Municipality on the island of Ertvågsøya (population: 141), and the part of Tustna Municipality on the island of Ertvågsøya (population: 85) were all merged into Aure Municipality. On 1 January 1976, the district of Aure located south of the Vinjefjorden (population: 158) was merged into the neighboring Halsa Municipality. On 1 January 2006, Tustna Municipality was merged into Aure Municipality.

=== Name ===
The municipality (originally the parish) is named after the old Aure farm (Old Norse: Aurar) since the first Aure Church was built there. The name is the plural form of aurr which means "gravel" or "mud".

=== Coat of arms ===
The original coat of arms was granted on 22 March 1991 and it was in use until 1 January 2006 when Tustna Municipality and Aure Municipality merged to form a new, larger Aure Municipality. The official blazon is "Gules, two addorsed eagle heads erased Or" (Norwegian: I rødt to adosserte gull ørnehoder). This means the arms have a red field (background) and the charge is two heads of a sea eagle facing opposite directions. The charge has a tincture of Or which means it is commonly colored yellow, but if it is made out of metal, then gold is used. The design was chosen since there is a large population of these birds in the municipality. The arms were designed by Even Skoglund. The municipal flag has the same design as the coat of arms.

A new coat of arms was granted on 21 December 2005, just before the merger of the municipalities of Tustna and Aure so that it could be used starting on 1 January 2006 when the two municipalities were merged. It was decided to combine the arms of the two municipalities by using the charge from the old arms of Tustna and the colors from the old arms of Aure. The official blazon is "Azure, a klippfisk argent" (Norwegian: I blått en sølv klippfisk). This means the arms have a blue field (background) and the charge is a klippfisk which is a split and salted dried fish, usually cod. Traditionally, the fish was spread out on a rock to sun dry which gives the klippfisk its symmetrical shape (as opposed to the stockfish). The charge has a tincture of argent which means it is commonly colored white, but if it is made out of metal, then silver is used. The design was chosen since the klippfisk industry was pioneered in the Tustna area starting in the 1690s. The arms were designed by Jarle Skuseth. The municipal flag has the same design as the coat of arms.

Current arms of Aure (since 2006)

Old arms of Aure (before 2006)

Old arms of Tustna (before 2006)

=== Churches ===
The Church of Norway has three parishes (sokn) within Aure Municipality. It is part of the Ytre Nordmøre prosti (deanery) in the Diocese of Møre.

Churches in Aure Municipality
Parish (sokn)	Church name	Location of the church	Year built
Aure	Aure Church	Aure	1924
Stemshaug	Stemshaug Church	Stemshaug	1908
Tustna	Gullstein Church	Gullstein	1869
Tustna	Sør-Tustna Chapel	Tømmervåg	1952

== Geography ==
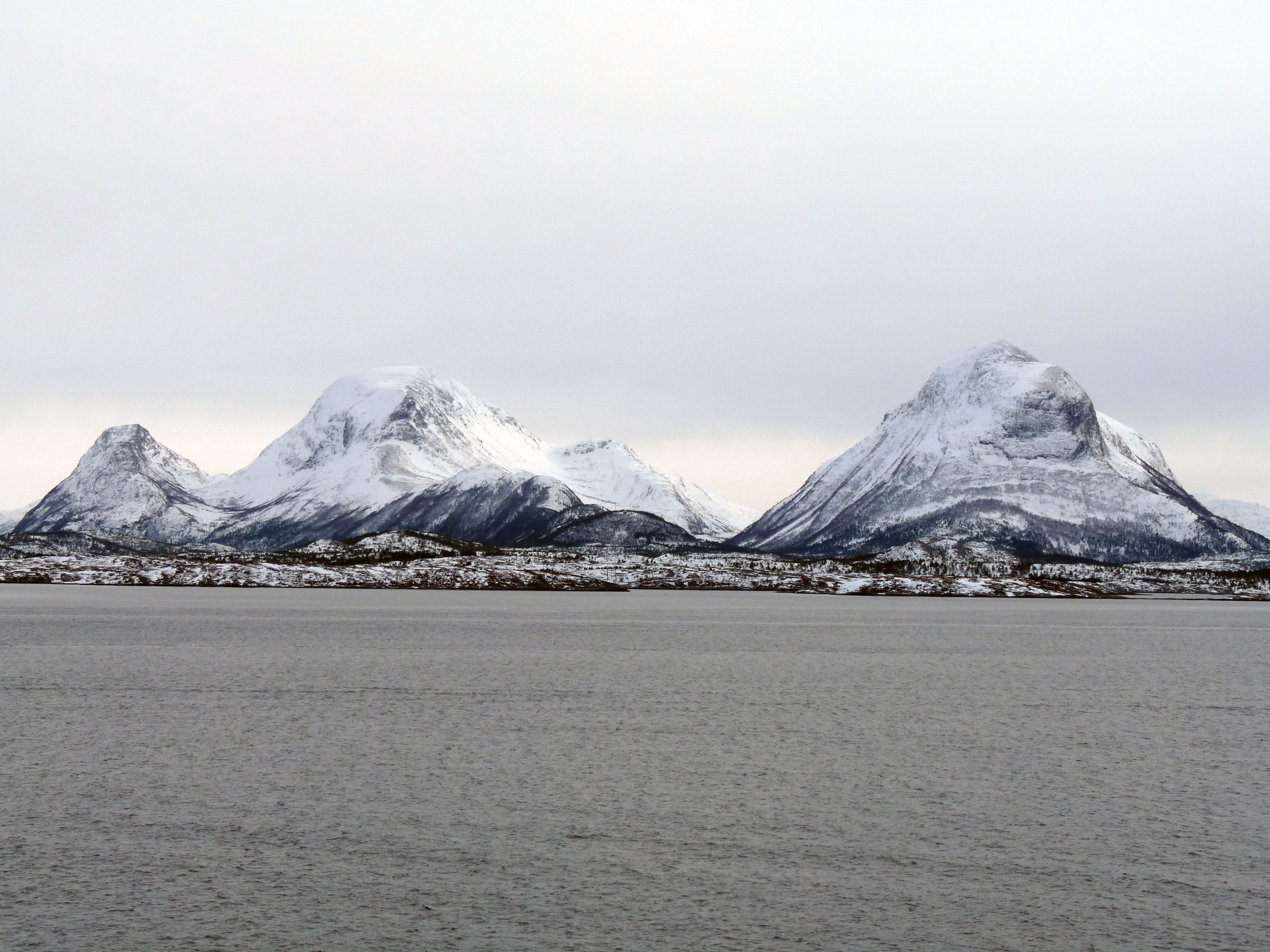
View of Tustna.

The municipality includes many islands as well as some parts of the mainland. Islands of Aure include Ertvågsøya, Grisvågøya, Rottøya, Ruøya, Skardsøya, Solskjelsøya, Stabblandet, and Tustna. The Vinjefjorden, Arasvikfjord, and Edøyfjorden surround the municipality. Several bridges connect the islands including the Mjosund Bridge, Aursund Bridge, and Dromnessund Bridge. The highest point in the municipality is the 907.81-metre (2,978.4 ft) tall mountain Innerbergsalen.

== Government ==
Aure Municipality is responsible for primary education (through 10th grade), outpatient health services, senior citizen services, welfare and other social services, zoning, economic development, and municipal roads and utilities. The municipality is governed by a municipal council of directly elected representatives. The mayor is indirectly elected by a vote of the municipal council. The municipality is under the jurisdiction of the Nordmøre og Romsdal District Court and the Frostating Court of Appeal. Waste management was provided by the inter-municipal agency Nordmøre Interkommunale Renovasjonsselskap until 2020, after which it merged into ReMidt. Waste collection has since 2018 been operated by ReTrans Midt.

=== Municipal council ===
The municipal council (Kommunestyre) of Aure Municipality is made up of 19 representatives that are elected to four year terms. The tables below show the current and historical composition of the council by political party.

Aure kommunestyre 2023–2027
Party name (in Norwegian)	Number of representatives
Labour Party (Arbeiderpartiet)	10
Progress Party (Fremskrittspartiet)	1
Conservative Party (Høyre)	4
Christian Democratic Party (Kristelig Folkeparti)	1
Centre Party (Senterpartiet)	3
Total number of members:	19

Aure Kommunestyre after the 2023 local elections

Aure kommunestyre 2019–2023
Party name (in Norwegian)	Number of representatives
Labour Party (Arbeiderpartiet)	6
Conservative Party (Høyre)	3
Christian Democratic Party (Kristelig Folkeparti)	1
Centre Party (Senterpartiet)	6
Liberal Party (Venstre)	1
Nordmøre List (Nordmørslista)	2
Total number of members:	19

Aure kommunestyre 2015–2019
Party name (in Norwegian)	Number of representatives
Labour Party (Arbeiderpartiet)	6
Progress Party (Fremskrittspartiet)	1
Conservative Party (Høyre)	2
Christian Democratic Party (Kristelig Folkeparti)	1
Centre Party (Senterpartiet)	9
Liberal Party (Venstre)	2
Total number of members:	21

Aure kommunestyre 2011–2015
Party name (in Norwegian)	Number of representatives
Labour Party (Arbeiderpartiet)	6
Progress Party (Fremskrittspartiet)	1
Conservative Party (Høyre)	4
Christian Democratic Party (Kristelig Folkeparti)	1
Centre Party (Senterpartiet)	6
Liberal Party (Venstre)	3
Total number of members:	21

Aure kommunestyre 2007–2011
Party name (in Norwegian)	Number of representatives
Labour Party (Arbeiderpartiet)	5
Progress Party (Fremskrittspartiet)	2
Conservative Party (Høyre)	4
Christian Democratic Party (Kristelig Folkeparti)	1
Centre Party (Senterpartiet)	6
Socialist Left Party (Sosialistisk Venstreparti)	1
Liberal Party (Venstre)	4
Total number of members:	23

Aure kommunestyre 2003–2007
Party name (in Norwegian)	Number of representatives
Labour Party (Arbeiderpartiet)	6
Conservative Party (Høyre)	5
Christian Democratic Party (Kristelig Folkeparti)	1
Centre Party (Senterpartiet)	3
Liberal Party (Venstre)	2
Aure List (Aurelista)	2
Omega Action (Omega-aksjonen)	2
Total number of members:	21

Aure kommunestyre 1999–2003
Party name (in Norwegian)	Number of representatives
Labour Party (Arbeiderpartiet)	6
Conservative Party (Høyre)	6
Christian Democratic Party (Kristelig Folkeparti)	3
Centre Party (Senterpartiet)	4
Liberal Party (Venstre)	2
Total number of members:	21

Aure kommunestyre 1995–1999
Party name (in Norwegian)	Number of representatives
Labour Party (Arbeiderpartiet)	6
Conservative Party (Høyre)	5
Christian Democratic Party (Kristelig Folkeparti)	3
Centre Party (Senterpartiet)	6
Liberal Party (Venstre)	1
Total number of members:	21

Aure kommunestyre 1991–1995
Party name (in Norwegian)	Number of representatives
Labour Party (Arbeiderpartiet)	6
Conservative Party (Høyre)	6
Christian Democratic Party (Kristelig Folkeparti)	2
Centre Party (Senterpartiet)	6
Liberal Party (Venstre)	1
Total number of members:	21

Aure kommunestyre 1987–1991
Party name (in Norwegian)	Number of representatives
Labour Party (Arbeiderpartiet)	9
Conservative Party (Høyre)	4
Christian Democratic Party (Kristelig Folkeparti)	3
Centre Party (Senterpartiet)	6
Liberal Party (Venstre)	3
Total number of members:	25

Aure kommunestyre 1983–1987
Party name (in Norwegian)	Number of representatives
Labour Party (Arbeiderpartiet)	10
Conservative Party (Høyre)	3
Christian Democratic Party (Kristelig Folkeparti)	3
Centre Party (Senterpartiet)	6
Liberal Party (Venstre)	3
Total number of members:	25

Aure kommunestyre 1979–1983
Party name (in Norwegian)	Number of representatives
Labour Party (Arbeiderpartiet)	8
Conservative Party (Høyre)	4
Christian Democratic Party (Kristelig Folkeparti)	3
Centre Party (Senterpartiet)	6
Liberal Party (Venstre)	4
Total number of members:	25

Aure kommunestyre 1975–1979
Party name (in Norwegian)	Number of representatives
Labour Party (Arbeiderpartiet)	9
Conservative Party (Høyre)	2
Christian Democratic Party (Kristelig Folkeparti)	3
Centre Party (Senterpartiet)	7
Liberal Party (Venstre)	4
Total number of members:	25

Aure kommunestyre 1971–1975
Party name (in Norwegian)	Number of representatives
Labour Party (Arbeiderpartiet)	9
Conservative Party (Høyre)	4
Christian Democratic Party (Kristelig Folkeparti)	3
Centre Party (Senterpartiet)	6
Liberal Party (Venstre)	3
Total number of members:	25

Aure kommunestyre 1967–1971
Party name (in Norwegian)	Number of representatives
Labour Party (Arbeiderpartiet)	12
Christian Democratic Party (Kristelig Folkeparti)	3
Centre Party (Senterpartiet)	7
Liberal Party (Venstre)	5
Local List(s) (Lokale lister)	2
Total number of members:	29

Aure kommunestyre 1963–1967
Party name (in Norwegian)	Number of representatives
Labour Party (Arbeiderpartiet)	9
Christian Democratic Party (Kristelig Folkeparti)	2
Centre Party (Senterpartiet)	5
Liberal Party (Venstre)	5
Total number of members:	21

Aure herredsstyre 1959–1963
Party name (in Norwegian)	Number of representatives
Labour Party (Arbeiderpartiet)	8
Christian Democratic Party (Kristelig Folkeparti)	2
Centre Party (Senterpartiet)	5
Liberal Party (Venstre)	6
Total number of members:	21

Aure herredsstyre 1955–1959
Party name (in Norwegian)	Number of representatives
Labour Party (Arbeiderpartiet)	8
Christian Democratic Party (Kristelig Folkeparti)	2
Farmers' Party (Bondepartiet)	5
Liberal Party (Venstre)	6
Total number of members:	21

Aure herredsstyre 1951–1955
Party name (in Norwegian)	Number of representatives
Labour Party (Arbeiderpartiet)	8
Christian Democratic Party (Kristelig Folkeparti)	2
Farmers' Party (Bondepartiet)	5
Liberal Party (Venstre)	5
Total number of members:	20

Aure herredsstyre 1947–1951
Party name (in Norwegian)	Number of representatives
Labour Party (Arbeiderpartiet)	8
Christian Democratic Party (Kristelig Folkeparti)	2
Farmers' Party (Bondepartiet)	5
Liberal Party (Venstre)	5
Total number of members:	20

Aure herredsstyre 1945–1947
Party name (in Norwegian)	Number of representatives
Labour Party (Arbeiderpartiet)	8
Farmers' Party (Bondepartiet)	5
Liberal Party (Venstre)	6
Local List(s) (Lokale lister)	1
Total number of members:	20

Aure herredsstyre 1937–1941*
Party name (in Norwegian)	Number of representatives
Labour Party (Arbeiderpartiet)	8
Farmers' Party (Bondepartiet)	8
Liberal Party (Venstre)	4
Total number of members:	20
Note: Due to the German occupation of Norway during World War II, no elections were held for new municipal councils until after the war ended in 1945.

=== Mayors ===
The mayor (Norwegian: ordfører) of Aure Municipality is the political leader of the municipality and the chairperson of the municipal council. Here is a list of people who have held this position:

- 1838–1841: Caspar Karhs Lossius
- 1842–1843: Johannes Ivarson Høgset
- 1844–1845: Lars Ivarson Våg
- 1846–1849: Caspar Karhs Lossius
- 1850–1851: Johannes Ivarson Høgset
- 1852–1853: Anders Arntson Todal
- 1854–1855: Lars Ivarson Våg
- 1856–1857: Johan Chr. H. Buschmann
- 1858–1861: Marcus Hegge Lossius
- 1862–1867: Lars Ivarson Våg
- 1868–1869: Lars S. Vingsnes, Sr.
- 1870–1871: Augustinius P. Todal
- 1872–1873: Jon Danielsen Espvik
- 1874–1875: Olaus Larsson Talgø
- 1876–1883: Arnt Arntson Todal
- 1883–1889: Ole Ulfsnes (V)
- 1889–1895: Tølløv T. Todal (V)
- 1895–1898: Ole Jonsson Ertvåg (V)
- 1898–1904: Tølløv T. Todal (V)
- 1904–1907: Ole Jonsson Ertvåg (V)
- 1907–1916: Peder P. Todal (LL)
- 1916–1922: Sivert Ødegaard (V)
- 1922–1928: Anders L. Todal (LL)
- 1929–1940: Jakob A. Todal (LL)
- 1941–1942: Anders L. Todal (V)
- 1942–1945: Lars Vingsnes, Jr. (NS)
- 1946–1951: Arne Slætta (V)
- 1951–1957: Sivert Todal (V)
- 1957–1959: Øyvind Barlaup (Bp)
- 1959–1964: Ola Eines (V)
- 1965–1967: Sivert Haltbakk (Ap)
- 1967–1971: Johannes J. Vaag (Sp)
- 1971–1973: Bodolf Hareide (H)
- 1973–1975: Johannes J. Vaag (Sp)
- 1975–1979: Lars F. Berg (V)
- 1979–1983: Hans Kiplesund (Sp)
- 1983–1985: Lars F. Berg (V)
- 1985–2005: Knut Baardset (H)
- 2006–2007: Hans G. Lauritzen (Ap)
- 2007–2019: Ingunn Oldervik Golmen (Sp)
- 2019–present: Hanne Berit Brekken (Ap)

== Economy ==
Agriculture and aquaculture employ 13.6% of the workforce, mostly within dairy farming, fishing, and fish farming. Manufacturing industry and construction employ 25.5%, where the most important industries are the shipyards in Mjosundet and the natural gas processing plant in Tjeldbergodden, as well as the Tjeldbergodden Reserve Power Station. A liquefied natural gas (LNG) pipeline from the Heidrun oil field terminates here. The remaining 60.5% work in the service industry.

== Notable people ==
- Paul Vighals (1886 in Aure – 1962), a sport shooter who competed at the 1912 Summer Olympics
- Sivert Todal (1904 in Aure – 1988), a politician who was Mayor of Aure Municipality from 1951–1957
- Kristofer Leirdal (1915 in Aure – 2010), a sculptor and art educator
