= Heim =

Heim is the German, Norwegian, Icelandic and Faroese equivalent of the English word home. It is a common German and Norwegian suffix in place names such as Mannheim and Trondheim. In Norwegian place names, the suffix is often weakened to just -um, -eim, -im, or even just -m, such as in Bærum, Elverum, Modum, Sørum, Bjerkreim, Askim and Sem. The old form has been revived in some names such as Austrheim, Grindheim, Jessheim, and Jotunheimen.

Heim may refer to:

== People ==
- Heim (surname), a list of people with this surname
- Heims (surname), a list of people with this surname

== Places ==
- Heim Municipality, a municipality in Trøndelag county, Norway
- Heim (village), a village within Heim Municipality in Trøndelag county, Norway
- Heim Church, a church in Heim Municipality in Trøndelag county, Norway
- Heim Municipality (1911-1964), a former municipality in the old Sør-Trøndelag county, Norway
- Heim Glacier, Antarctica
- Heim Glacier (Greenland)
- Heim Peninsula, a peninsula on Ellesmere Island in Nunavut, Canada
- Heims Lake, a lake in Minnesota

== Others ==
- Heim Barbecue, a Barbecue restaurant in Fort Worth, Texas
- Heim theory, a collection of ideas about the fundamental laws of physics
- Heim, a 2011 album by Icelandic singer Jón Jónsson
- HeIM, a Scanning helium ion microscope

== See also ==
- Chayyim
- Haim (disambiguation)
- Heym
