= Snillfjord =

Snillfjord may refer to:

== Places ==
- Snillfjorden, a fjord in Trøndelag county, Norway
- Snillfjord Church, a church in Heim Municipality in Trøndelag county, Norway
- Snillfjord Municipality, a former municipality in Trøndelag county, Norway
- Ytre Snillfjord, a village in Heim Municipality in Trøndelag county, Norway
