= Snillfjord Municipality =

Former municipality in Trøndelag, Norway

Snillfjord Municipality Snillfjord kommune
- Former municipality
- Snilfjord herred (historic name)
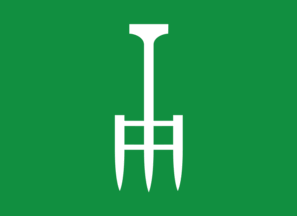
- Flag Coat of arms

- Trøndelag within Norway

- Snillfjord within Trøndelag
- Coordinates: 63°25′29″N 09°26′05″E
- Country: Norway
- County: Trøndelag
- District: Fosen
- Established: 1 July 1924
  - Preceded by: Hemne Municipality
- Disestablished: 1 Jan 2020
  - Succeeded by: Hitra Municipality, Heim Municipality, and Orkland Municipality
- Administrative centre: Krokstadøra

Government
  - Mayor (2015-2019): John Lernes (Ap)

Area (upon dissolution)
  - Total: 508.12 km^{2} (196.19 sq mi)
  - Land: 488.96 km^{2} (188.79 sq mi)
  - Water: 19.16 km^{2} (7.40 sq mi) 3.8%
  - Rank: #209 in Norway
- Highest elevation: 791.7 m (2,597 ft)

Population (2019)
  - Total: 999
  - Rank: #393 in Norway
  - Density: 2/km^{2} (5.2/sq mi)
  - Change (10 years): ▲ +1.1%
- Demonym: Snillfjording

Official language
  - Norwegian form: Neutral
- Time zone: UTC+01:00 (CET)
  - Summer (DST): UTC+02:00 (CEST)
- ISO 3166 code: NO-5012

Snillfjord is a former municipality in Trøndelag county, Norway. The municipality existed from 1924 until its dissolution in 2020 when it was split between Hitra Municipality, Heim Municipality, and Orkland Municipality. It was part of the Fosen region. The administrative centre of the municipality was the village of Krokstadøra. Other villages in Snillfjord Municipality included Ytre Snillfjord, Hemnskjela, Selnes, and Vutudal.

Prior to its dissolution in 2020, the 508-square-kilometre (196 sq mi) municipality was the 209th largest by area out of the 422 municipalities in Norway. Snillfjord Municipality was the 393rd most populous municipality in Norway with a population of 999. The municipality's population density was 2 inhabitants per square kilometre (5.2/sq mi) and its population had increased by 1.1% over the previous 10-year period.

== General information ==
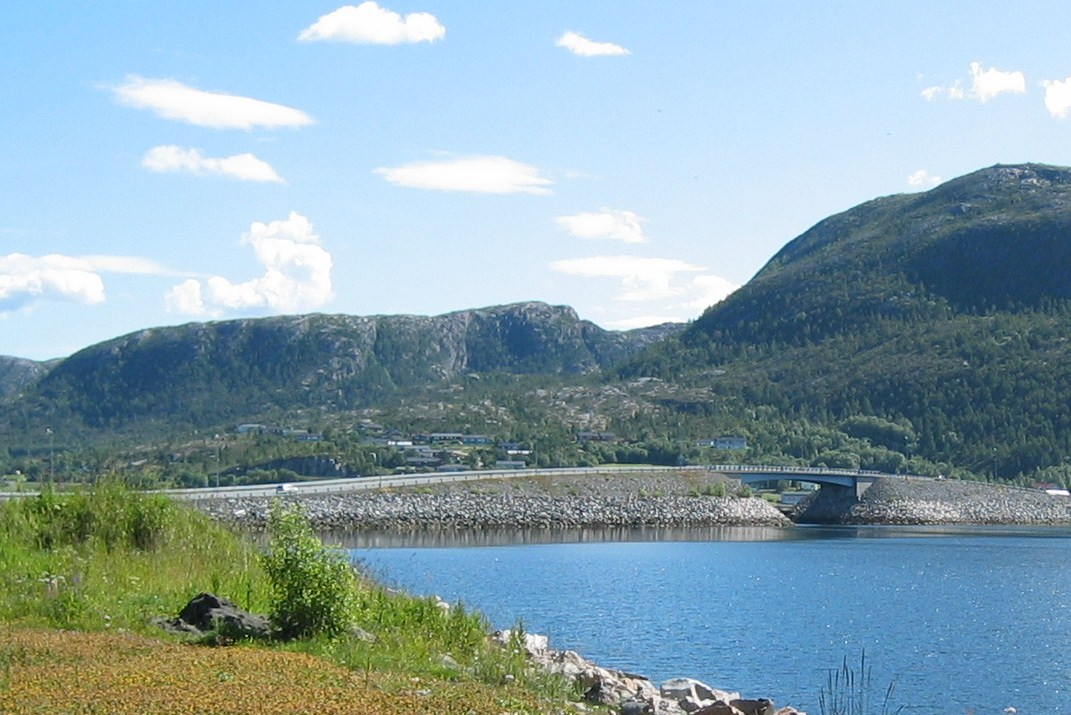
View of the Hemnskjelbrua (bridge) in Snillfjord

The municipality of Snillfjord was established on 1 July 1924 when it was separated from the large Hemne Municipality. The initial population was 776. During the 1960s, there were many municipal mergers across Norway due to the work of the Schei Committee. On 1 January 1964, the eastern part of the old Heim Municipality (population: 724) and the western part of the neighboring Agdenes Municipality (population: 196) were merged with Snillfjord Municipality (population: 681) to form a new, larger Snillfjord Municipality. On 1 January 1995, the Midtun area of Agdenes Municipality (population: 21) was transferred into Snillfjord Municipality. A road to the area had recently been built, but it connected to Snillfjord Municipality and not Agdenes Municipality, so it was decided to switch to the other municipality due to the newly opened road connection.

On 1 January 2018, the municipality switched from the old Sør-Trøndelag county to the new Trøndelag county.

On 1 January 2020, Snillfjord Municipality was dissolved and its lands were split between its three neighboring municipalities: the northwestern portion of joined Hitra Municipality, the southwestern Vennastranda area joined the new Heim Municipality, and the rest joined the new Orkland Municipality.

=== Name ===
The municipality (originally the parish) is named after the Snillfjorden since it was a central geographic feature of the municipality. The first element is probably an old name of the Snilldalselva river. The river name is derived from snild which comes from the word snjallr which means "fast" (related to German schnell). The last element is fjorden which means "the fjord". Historically, the name of the municipality was spelled Snilfjord. On 19 August 1938, a royal resolution changed the spelling of the name of the municipality to Snillfjord.

=== Coat of arms ===
The coat of arms was granted on 31 August 1990 and it was in use until 1 January 2020 when the municipality was dissolved. The official blazon is "Vert, a pitchfork argent" (Norwegian: I grønt et sølv greip). This means the arms have a green field (background) and the charge is a pitchfork. The pitchfork has a tincture of argent which means it is commonly colored white, but if it is made out of metal, then silver is used. This design was chosen to symbolize the importance of agriculture in the municipality. The arms were designed by Einar H. Skjervold. The municipal flag has the same design as the coat of arms.

=== Churches ===
The Church of Norway had one parish (sokn) within Snillfjord Municipality. It is part of the Orkdal prosti (deanery) in the Diocese of Nidaros.

Churches in Snillfjord Municipality
Parish (sokn)	Church name	Location of the church	Year built
Snillfjord	Snillfjord Church	Krokstadøra	1898

== Geography ==
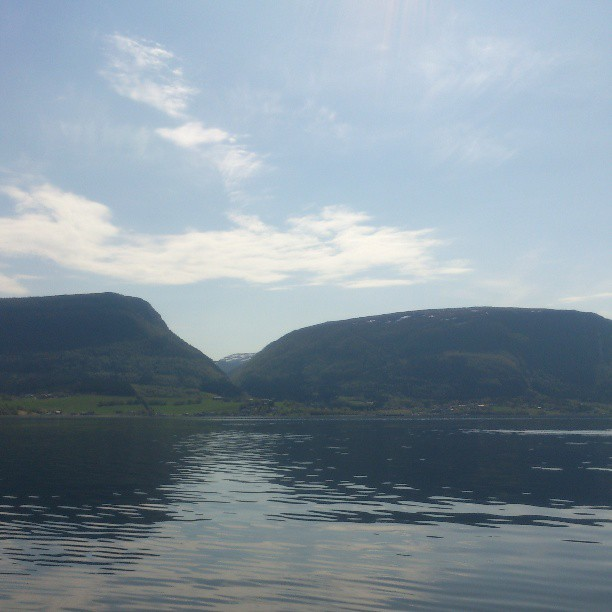
Vennastranda in Snillfjord Municipality

The municipality of Snillfjord was located south of the Trondheimsleia and east of the Hemnfjorden. The Åstfjorden and Snillfjorden flowed east from the Hemnfjorden into the municipality. The lake Våvatnet was located on the border with Orkdal Municipality in the southeast. The island of Hemnskjela lies in the Trondheimsleia in the north, and it is the southern entrance to the Hitra Tunnel. The highest point in the municipality was the 791.7-metre (2,597 ft) tall mountain Gråurda.

The 508-square-kilometre (196 sq mi) municipality of Snillfjord was surrounded by four municipalities. Hemne Municipality was to the southwest, Hitra Municipality was to the northwest, Agdenes Municipality was to the northeast, and Orkdal Municipality was to the southeast.

== Government ==
While it existed, Snillfjord Municipality was responsible for primary education (through 10th grade), outpatient health services, senior citizen services, welfare and other social services, zoning, economic development, and municipal roads and utilities. The municipality was governed by a municipal council of directly elected representatives. The mayor was indirectly elected by a vote of the municipal council. The municipality was under the jurisdiction of the Sør-Trøndelag District Court and the Frostating Court of Appeal. Waste management was from 1995 handled by the inter-municipal agency HAMOS Forvaltning.

=== Municipal council ===
The municipal council (Kommunestyre) of Snillfjord Municipality is made up of 17 representatives that are elected to four year terms. The tables below show the historical composition of the council by political party.

Snillfjord kommunestyre 2015–2019
Party name (in Norwegian)	Number of representatives
Labour Party (Arbeiderpartiet)	9
Green Party (Miljøpartiet De Grønne)	1
Centre Party (Senterpartiet)	7
Total number of members:	17

Snillfjord kommunestyre 2011–2015
Party name (in Norwegian)	Number of representatives
Labour Party (Arbeiderpartiet)	5
Conservative Party (Høyre)	6
Christian Democratic Party (Kristelig Folkeparti)	1
Centre Party (Senterpartiet)	5
Total number of members:	17

Snillfjord kommunestyre 2007–2011
Party name (in Norwegian)	Number of representatives
Labour Party (Arbeiderpartiet)	5
Conservative Party (Høyre)	7
Centre Party (Senterpartiet)	5
Total number of members:	17

Snillfjord kommunestyre 2003–2007
Party name (in Norwegian)	Number of representatives
Labour Party (Arbeiderpartiet)	4
Conservative Party (Høyre)	5
Christian Democratic Party (Kristelig Folkeparti)	2
Centre Party (Senterpartiet)	5
Snillfjord Cross-party List (Snillfjord Tverrpolitiske Liste)	1
Total number of members:	17

Snillfjord kommunestyre 1999–2003
Party name (in Norwegian)	Number of representatives
Labour Party (Arbeiderpartiet)	5
Conservative Party (Høyre)	1
Christian Democratic Party (Kristelig Folkeparti)	3
Centre Party (Senterpartiet)	8
Non-party local list (Upolitisk kretsliste)	4
Total number of members:	21

Snillfjord kommunestyre 1995–1999
Party name (in Norwegian)	Number of representatives
Labour Party (Arbeiderpartiet)	5
Christian Democratic Party (Kristelig Folkeparti)	3
Centre Party (Senterpartiet)	8
Non-party list (Upolitisk liste)	5
Total number of members:	21

Snillfjord kommunestyre 1991–1995
Party name (in Norwegian)	Number of representatives
Labour Party (Arbeiderpartiet)	6
Christian Democratic Party (Kristelig Folkeparti)	3
Centre Party (Senterpartiet)	7
Socialist Left Party (Sosialistisk Venstreparti)	1
Non-party local list (Upolitisk kretslist)	4
Total number of members:	21

Snillfjord kommunestyre 1987–1991
Party name (in Norwegian)	Number of representatives
Labour Party (Arbeiderpartiet)	8
Conservative Party (Høyre)	1
Christian Democratic Party (Kristelig Folkeparti)	3
Centre Party (Senterpartiet)	5
Non-party local list (Upolitisk kretsliste)	4
Total number of members:	21

Snillfjord kommunestyre 1983–1987
Party name (in Norwegian)	Number of representatives
Labour Party (Arbeiderpartiet)	6
Conservative Party (Høyre)	1
Christian Democratic Party (Kristelig Folkeparti)	3
Centre Party (Senterpartiet)	5
Liberal Party (Venstre)	1
Non-party local list (Upolitisk kretsliste)	5
Total number of members:	21

Snillfjord kommunestyre 1979–1983
Party name (in Norwegian)	Number of representatives
Labour Party (Arbeiderpartiet)	5
Conservative Party (Høyre)	4
Christian Democratic Party (Kristelig Folkeparti)	4
Centre Party (Senterpartiet)	7
Liberal Party (Venstre)	1
Total number of members:	21

Snillfjord kommunestyre 1975–1979
Party name (in Norwegian)	Number of representatives
Labour Party (Arbeiderpartiet)	6
Conservative Party (Høyre)	3
Christian Democratic Party (Kristelig Folkeparti)	4
Centre Party (Senterpartiet)	8
Total number of members:	21

Snillfjord kommunestyre 1971–1975
Party name (in Norwegian)	Number of representatives
Labour Party (Arbeiderpartiet)	8
Joint List(s) of Non-Socialist Parties (Borgerlige Felleslister)	12
Local List(s) (Lokale lister)	1
Total number of members:	21

Snillfjord kommunestyre 1967–1971
Party name (in Norwegian)	Number of representatives
Labour Party (Arbeiderpartiet)	8
Joint List(s) of Non-Socialist Parties (Borgerlige Felleslister)	12
Local List(s) (Lokale lister)	1
Total number of members:	21

Snillfjord kommunestyre 1963–1967
Party name (in Norwegian)	Number of representatives
Labour Party (Arbeiderpartiet)	7
Local List(s) (Lokale lister)	14
Total number of members:	21

Snillfjord herredsstyre 1959–1963
Party name (in Norwegian)	Number of representatives
Labour Party (Arbeiderpartiet)	6
Joint List(s) of Non-Socialist Parties (Borgerlige Felleslister)	2
Local List(s) (Lokale lister)	5
Total number of members:	13

Snillfjord herredsstyre 1955–1959
Party name (in Norwegian)	Number of representatives
Labour Party (Arbeiderpartiet)	6
Joint List(s) of Non-Socialist Parties (Borgerlige Felleslister)	7
Total number of members:	13

Snillfjord herredsstyre 1951–1955
Party name (in Norwegian)	Number of representatives
Labour Party (Arbeiderpartiet)	5
Joint List(s) of Non-Socialist Parties (Borgerlige Felleslister)	7
Total number of members:	12

Snillfjord herredsstyre 1947–1951
Party name (in Norwegian)	Number of representatives
Labour Party (Arbeiderpartiet)	4
Joint List(s) of Non-Socialist Parties (Borgerlige Felleslister)	8
Total number of members:	12

Snillfjord herredsstyre 1945–1947
Party name (in Norwegian)	Number of representatives
Joint List(s) of Non-Socialist Parties (Borgerlige Felleslister)	1
Local List(s) (Lokale lister)	7
Total number of members:	4

Snillfjord herredsstyre 1937–1941*
Party name (in Norwegian)	Number of representatives
Labour Party (Arbeiderpartiet)	5
Joint List(s) of Non-Socialist Parties (Borgerlige Felleslister)	7
Total number of members:	12
Note: Due to the German occupation of Norway during World War II, no elections were held for new municipal councils until after the war ended in 1945.

=== Mayors ===
The mayor (Norwegian: ordfører) of Snillfjord Municipality was the political leader of the municipality and the chairperson of the municipal council. Here is a list of people who held this position:

- 1924–1928: Haakon Myrholt (V)
- 1929–1931: Knut Snildal (Bp)
- 1932–1934: Sigurd Aune (Bp)
- 1935–1940: Arne O. Heggvik (V)
- 1941–1941: Anders Krogstad (NS)
- 1941–1942: Per P. Ven (NS)
- 1942–1945: Sigurd Aune (NS)
- 1945–1955: Arne O. Heggvik (V)
- 1956–1959: Einar Selnes (KrF)
- 1960–1967: John Snildal (Ap)
- 1968–1979: Jon Selnes (Sp)
- 1980–1983: Einar Berg (Sp)
- 1984–1995: Kåre Berdal (Ap)
- 1995–2000: Nils Gunnar Vuttudal (Sp)
- 2000–2007: Anders Krokstad (Sp)
- 2007–2011: John Lernes (H)
- 2011–2013: John Geir Stølan (Sp)
- 2013–2015: Anders Krokstad (Sp)
- 2015–2019: John Lernes (Ap)

== See also ==
- List of former municipalities of Norway
