= Heim Municipality (1911–1964) =

Former municipality in Trøndelag, Norway (1911-1964)

Heim Municipality Heim herred
- Former municipality
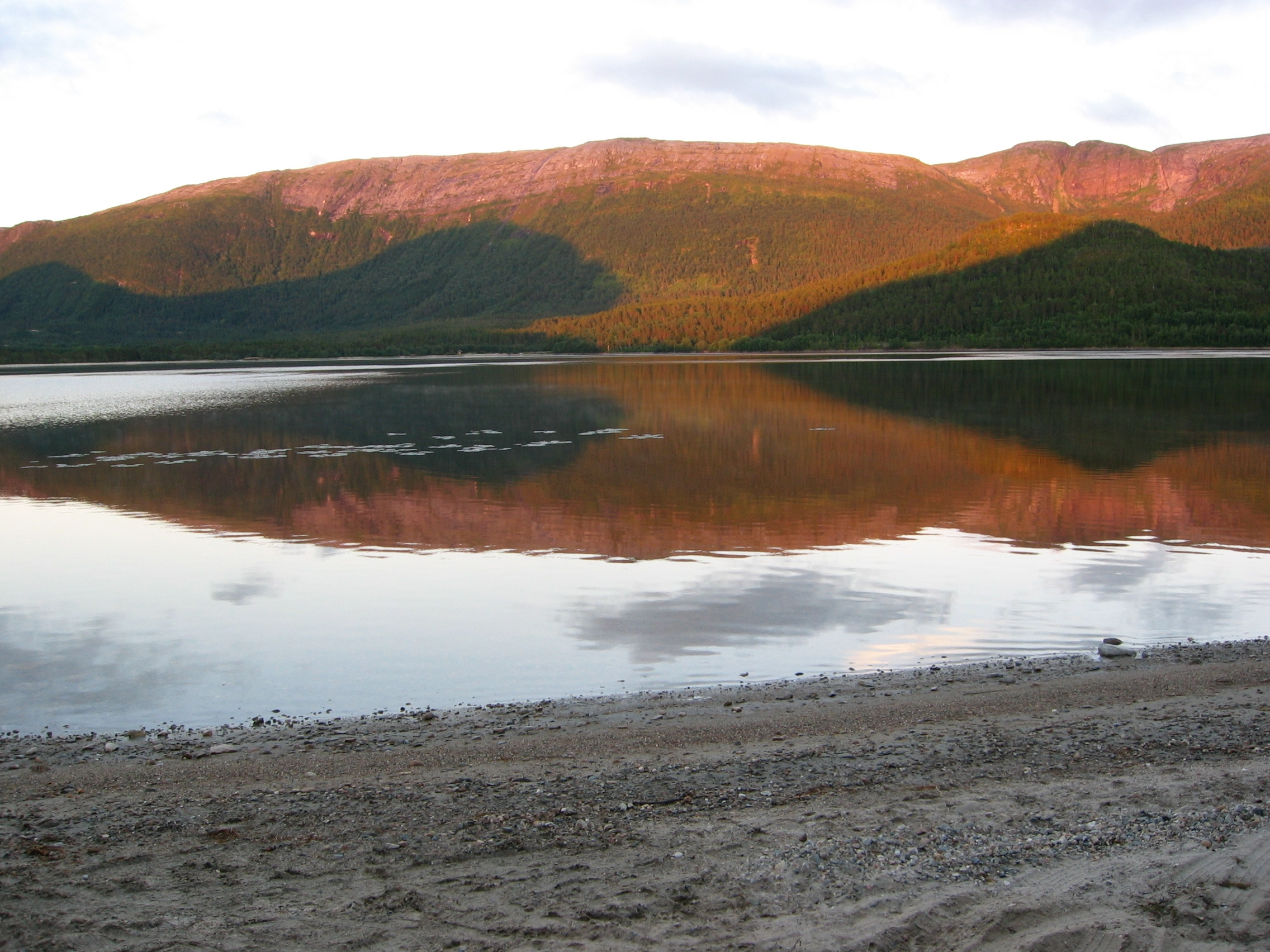
- View of the mountain Heimsfjellet

- Sør-Trøndelag within Norway

- Heim within Sør-Trøndelag
- Coordinates: 63.4238°N 09.0932°E
- Country: Norway
- County: Sør-Trøndelag
- District: Fosen
- Established: 1 Jan 1911
  - Preceded by: Hemne Municipality
- Disestablished: 1 Jan 1964
  - Succeeded by: Hemne Municipality and Snillfjord Municipality
- Administrative centre: Heim

Government
  - Mayor (1960–1963): Olaf Stamnes (Sp)

Area (upon dissolution)
  - Total: 276.6 km^{2} (106.8 sq mi)
  - Rank: #298 in Norway
- Highest elevation: 587 m (1,926 ft)

Population (1963)
  - Total: 1,466
  - Rank: #541 in Norway
  - Density: 5.3/km^{2} (14/sq mi)
  - Change (10 years): ▼ −6.3%
- Demonym: Heimsbygg

Official language
  - Norwegian form: Neutral
- Time zone: UTC+01:00 (CET)
  - Summer (DST): UTC+02:00 (CEST)
- ISO 3166 code: NO-1614

Heim is a former municipality in the old Sør-Trøndelag county in Norway. The 277-square-kilometre (107 sq mi) municipality existed from 1911 until its dissolution in 1964. The municipality encompassed the northern part of what is now Heim Municipality and Orkland Municipality and the southeastern part of Hitra Municipality in Trøndelag county. The administrative centre was the village of Heim where Heim Church is located.

Prior to its dissolution in 1963, the 276.6-square-kilometre (106.8 sq mi) municipality was the 298th largest by area out of the 689 municipalities in Norway. Heim Municipality was the 541st most populous municipality in Norway with a population of about 1,466. The municipality's population density was 5.3 inhabitants per square kilometre (14/sq mi) and its population had decreased by 6.3% over the previous 10-year period.

== General information ==
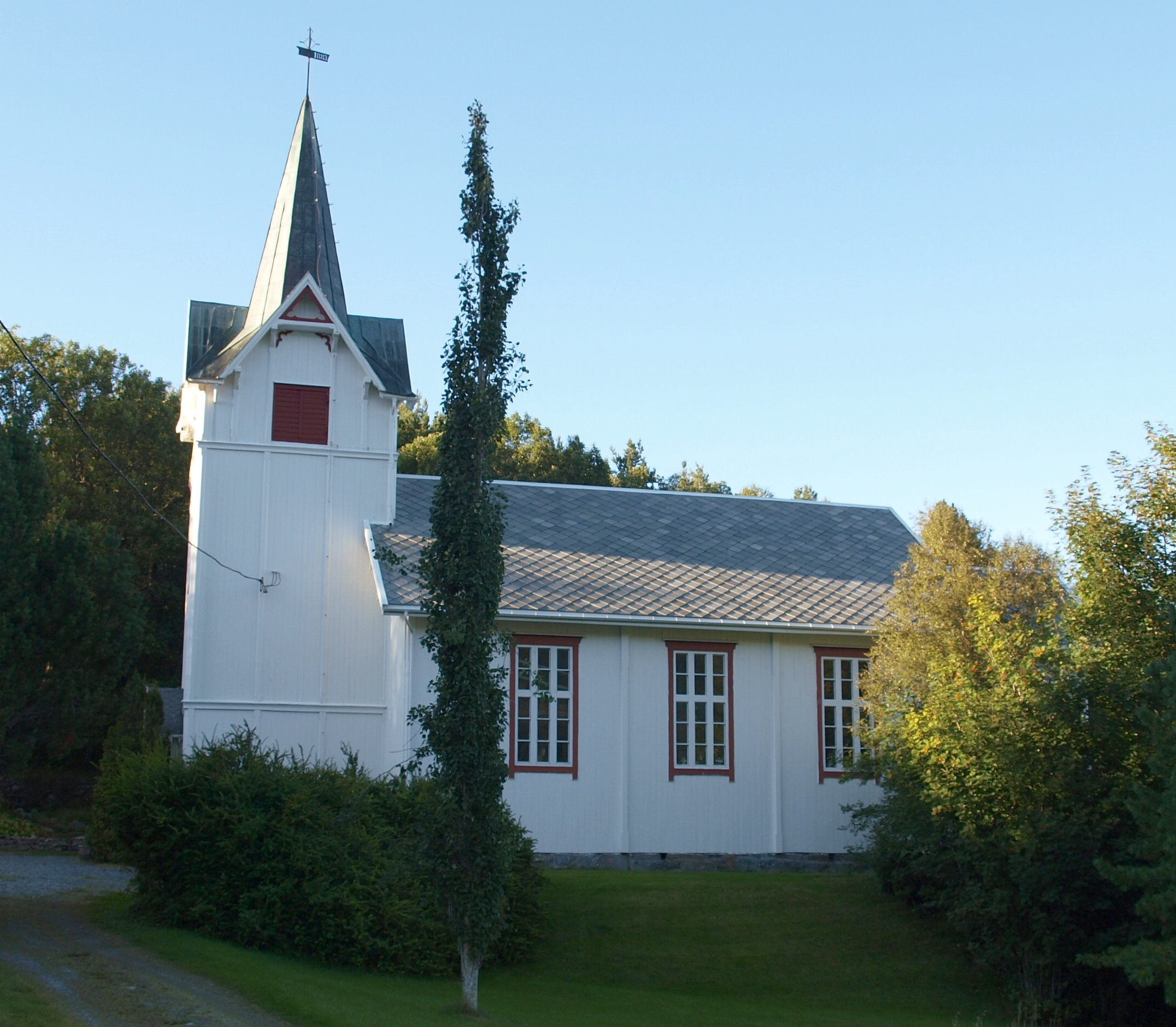
Heim Church

Originally (since 1838) the municipality was a part of Hemne Municipality (see formannskapsdistrikt law). On 1 January 1911, the large Hemne Municipality was divided into two: Hemne Municipality (population: 3,425) in the south and Heim Municipality (population: 1,533) in the north.

During the 1960s, there were many municipal mergers across Norway due to the work of the Schei Committee. On 1 January 1964, Heim Municipality ceased to exist as a municipality. The district of Vestre Heim (Western Heim, the area west of the Hemnefjord) with its 711 inhabitants was merged with the neighboring Hemne Municipality and Vinje Municipality to form a new, larger Hemne Municipality. At the same time, the district of Austre Heim (Eastern Heim, the area east of the Hemnfjorden) with its 724 residents was merged with the neighboring Snillfjord Municipality and part of Agdenes Municipality to become a new, larger Snillfjord Municipality.

=== Name ===
The municipality is named after the old Heim farm (Old Norse: Heimr) since the first Heim Church was built there. The name comes from the word heimr which means "home", "homestead", or "farm".

=== Churches ===
The Church of Norway had one parish (sokn) within Heim Municipality. At the time of the municipal dissolution, it was part of the Hemne prestegjeld and the Sør-Fosen prosti (deanery) in the Diocese of Nidaros.

Churches in Heim Municipality
Parish (sokn)	Church name	Location of the church	Year built
Heim	Heim Church	Heim	1883

== Geography ==
Heim Municipality was located along the south side of the Trondheimsleia strait, on both sides of the mouth of the Hemnfjorden. The highest point in the municipality was the 587-metre (1,926 ft) tall mountain Heimsfjellet. Agdenes Municipality and Lensvik Municipality were to the east, Snillfjord Municipality and Hemne Municipality were to the south, and Stemshaug Municipality (in Møre og Romsdal) was to the west. Sandstad Municipality was located across the strait to the north.

== Government ==
While it existed, Heim Municipality was responsible for primary education (through 10th grade), outpatient health services, senior citizen services, welfare and other social services, zoning, economic development, and municipal roads and utilities. The municipality was governed by a municipal council of directly elected representatives. The mayor was indirectly elected by a vote of the municipal council. The municipality was under the jurisdiction of the Frostating Court of Appeal.

=== Municipal council ===
The municipal council (Herredsstyre) of Heim Municipality was made up of 13 representatives that were elected to four year terms. The tables below show the historical composition of the council by political party.

Heim herredsstyre 1959–1963
Party name (in Norwegian)	Number of representatives
Labour Party (Arbeiderpartiet)	3
Local List(s) (Lokale lister)	10
Total number of members:	13

Heim herredsstyre 1955–1959
Party name (in Norwegian)	Number of representatives
Labour Party (Arbeiderpartiet)	2
Local List(s) (Lokale lister)	11
Total number of members:	13

Heim herredsstyre 1951–1955
Party name (in Norwegian)	Number of representatives
Labour Party (Arbeiderpartiet)	2
Local List(s) (Lokale lister)	10
Total number of members:	12

Heim herredsstyre 1947–1951
Party name (in Norwegian)	Number of representatives
Labour Party (Arbeiderpartiet)	2
Local List(s) (Lokale lister)	10
Total number of members:	12

Heim herredsstyre 1945–1947
Party name (in Norwegian)	Number of representatives
Local List(s) (Lokale lister)	12
Total number of members:	12

Heim herredsstyre 1937–1941*
Party name (in Norwegian)	Number of representatives
Labour Party (Arbeiderpartiet)	3
Joint List(s) of Non-Socialist Parties (Borgerlige Felleslister)	9
Total number of members:	12
Note: Due to the German occupation of Norway during World War II, no elections were held for new municipal councils until after the war ended in 1945.

=== Mayors ===
The mayor (Norwegian: ordfører) of Heim Municipality was the political leader of the municipality and the chairperson of the municipal council. Here is a list of people who held this position:

- 1911–1913: Johan Andersen Havnebugt (V)
- 1914–1916: John Johnsen Vaagan, Jr. (V)
- 1917–1919: Johan Edvardsen Vaagan (V)
- 1920–1922: John Johnsen Vaagan, Jr. (V)
- 1923–1925: Johan Edvardsen Vaagan (V)
- 1926–1928: John Johnsen Vaagan, Jr. (V)
- 1929–1945: Axel Aas (Ap)
- 1945–1945: Lars Belsvik
- 1946–1946: Axel Aas (Ap)
- 1946–1947: Kolbjørn Johansen Vaagan (Bp)
- 1947–1947: Axel Aas (Ap)
- 1948–1951: Kolbjørn Johansen Vaagan (Bp)
- 1952–1959: John Langø (Ap)
- 1960–1963: Olaf Stamnes (Sp)

== See also ==
- List of former municipalities of Norway
