= Hemne =

Hemne may refer to:

== Places ==
- Hemne Municipality, a former municipality in Trøndelag county, Norway
- Hemne Church, a church in Heim Municipality in Trøndelag county, Norway

== Other ==
- KIL/Hemne, a sports club based in Heim Municipality in Trøndelag county, Norway
- Hemne Orkladal Billag, a defunct Norwegian transport company

== See also ==
- Hemnes (disambiguation)
