= Hellandsjøen =

Village in Heim Municipality, Norway

- Village
- Interactive map of Hellandsjøen
- Location within Trøndelag Location within Norway
- Coordinates: 63.4039°N 08.9810°E
- Country: Norway
- Region: Central Norway
- County: Trøndelag
- District: Fosen
- Municipality: Heim Municipality
- Elevation: 18 m (59 ft)
- Time zone: UTC+01:00 (CET)
  - Summer (DST): UTC+02:00 (CEST)
- Post Code: 7206 Hellandsjøen

Hellandsjøen is a village in Heim Municipality in Trøndelag county, Norway. It is located near the Trondheimsleia and the Hemnfjorden, about 7 kilometres (4.3 mi) west of the village of Heim and about 15 kilometres (9.3 mi) north of the municipal center of Kyrksæterøra.
