= Heim Church =

Church in Trøndelag, Norway

- Heim kirke
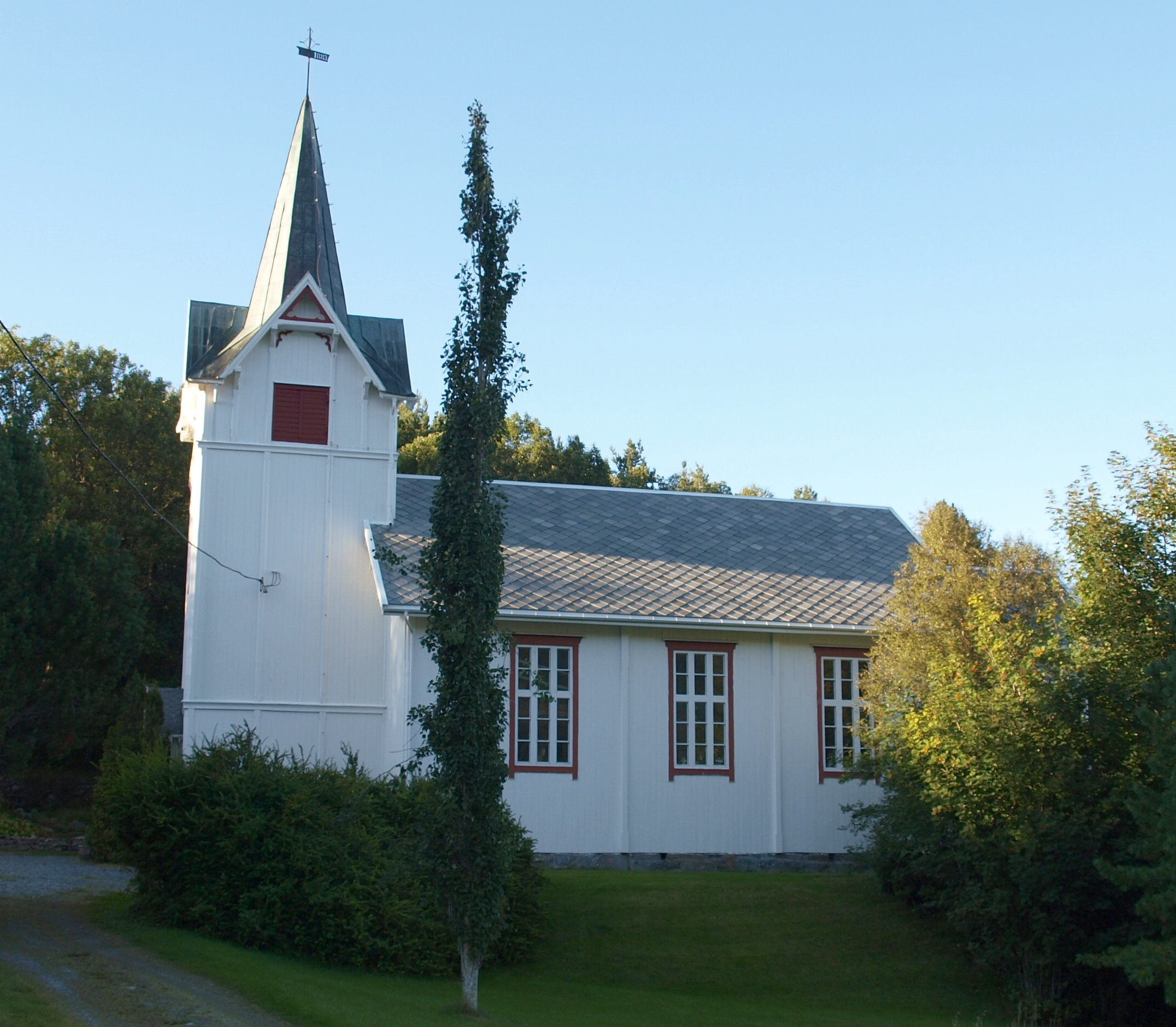
- View of the church
- Heim Church
- 63.4237463586°N 09.0932491421°E
- Location: Heim Municipality, Trøndelag
- Country: Norway
- Denomination: Church of Norway
- Churchmanship: Evangelical Lutheran

History
- Status: Parish church
- Founded: 1884
- Consecrated: 16 Jan 1884

Architecture
- Functional status: Active
- Architect: A.H. Thoresen
- Architectural type: Long church
- Completed: 1884 (142 years ago)

Specifications
- Capacity: 150
- Materials: Wood

Administration
- Diocese: Nidaros bispedømme
- Deanery: Orkdal prosti
- Parish: Heim
- Norwegian Cultural Heritage Site
- Type: Church
- Status: Not protected
- ID: 84525

Heim Church (Norwegian: Heim kirke) is a parish church of the Church of Norway in Heim Municipality in Trøndelag county, Norway. It is located in the village of Heim, on the shore of the Hemnfjorden. It is the church for the Heim parish which is part of the Orkdal prosti (deanery) in the Diocese of Nidaros. The white, wooden church was built in a long church style in 1884 using plans drawn up by the architect A.H. Thoresen from Kristiansund. The church seats about 150 people.

== History ==
On 30 September 1882, a royal resolution authorized the creation of the new Heim parish. Construction on the wooden church was started in 1883. The church was built to serve the people in the Heim area since the trip to the main Hemne Church in Kyrksæterøra was long by road or boat, plus that church was full to capacity with the people of that area. The Heim Church was built by local builders for a cost of 12,500 kr. The church was consecrated on 16 January 1884. Since the ground surrounding the church was not suitable for a graveyard, a cemetery was built about 1 kilometre (0.62 mi) to the southwest of the site of the new church in 1893. In 1962, the church was renovated and restored.

== See also ==
- List of churches in Nidaros
