= Våvatnet =

Lake in Trøndelag, Norway

- Interactive map of the lake
- Location: Orkland Municipality, Trøndelag
- Coordinates: 63.3291°N 09.5406°E
- Primary outflows: Sagelva
- Basin countries: Norway
- Built: 1910
- Max. length: 3 kilometres (1.9 mi)
- Max. width: 5 kilometres (3.1 mi)
- Surface area: 5 km^{2} (1.9 sq mi)
- Shore length^{1}: 19.7 kilometres (12.2 mi)
- Surface elevation: 300 metres (980 ft)
- References: NVE
- ^{1} Shore length is not a well-defined measure.

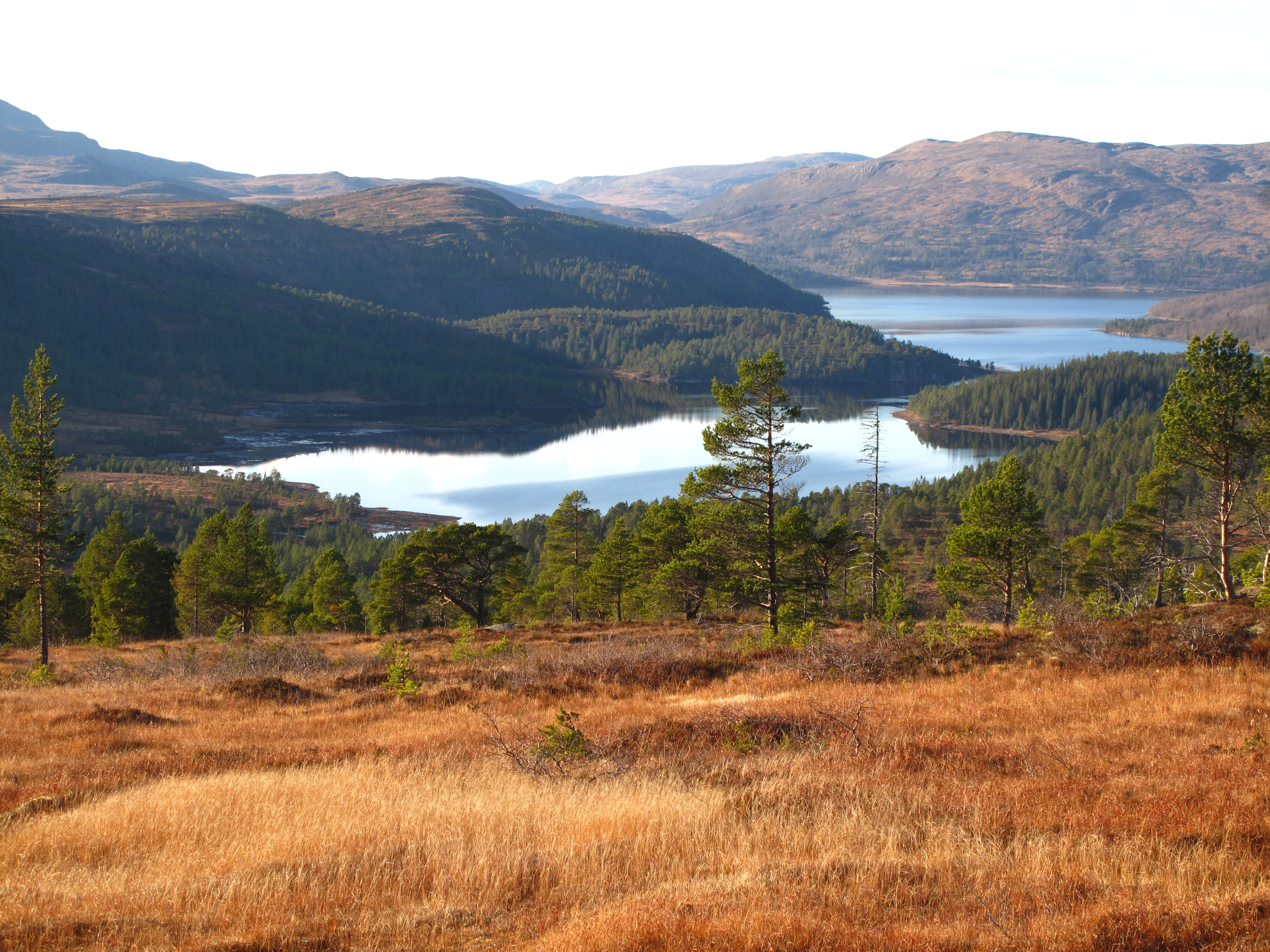
Våvatnet

Våvatnet is a lake in Orkland Municipality, Trøndelag county, Norway. The lake was dammed in 1910 and serves as the main reservoir for the former Orkdal Municipality. Water from Våvatnet flows into the lake Songsjøen and then onward into Gangåsvatnet.

The lake is located about 11 kilometres (6.8 mi) south of the village of Krokstadøra, 15 kilometres (9.3 mi) southeast of the village of Ytre Snillfjord, and 10 kilometres (6.2 mi) west of the village of Gjølme.

== See also ==
- List of lakes in Norway
