= Hostovatnet =

Lake in Trøndelag county, Norway

- Interactive map of the lake
- Location: Orkland Municipality, Trøndelag
- Coordinates: 63.1863°N 09.5660°E
- Basin countries: Norway
- Max. length: 3 kilometres (1.9 mi)
- Max. width: 2 kilometres (1.2 mi)
- Surface area: 3.14 km^{2} (1.21 sq mi)
- Shore length^{1}: 10.31 kilometres (6.41 mi)
- Surface elevation: 199 metres (653 ft)
- Settlements: Hoston
- References: NVE
- ^{1} Shore length is not a well-defined measure.

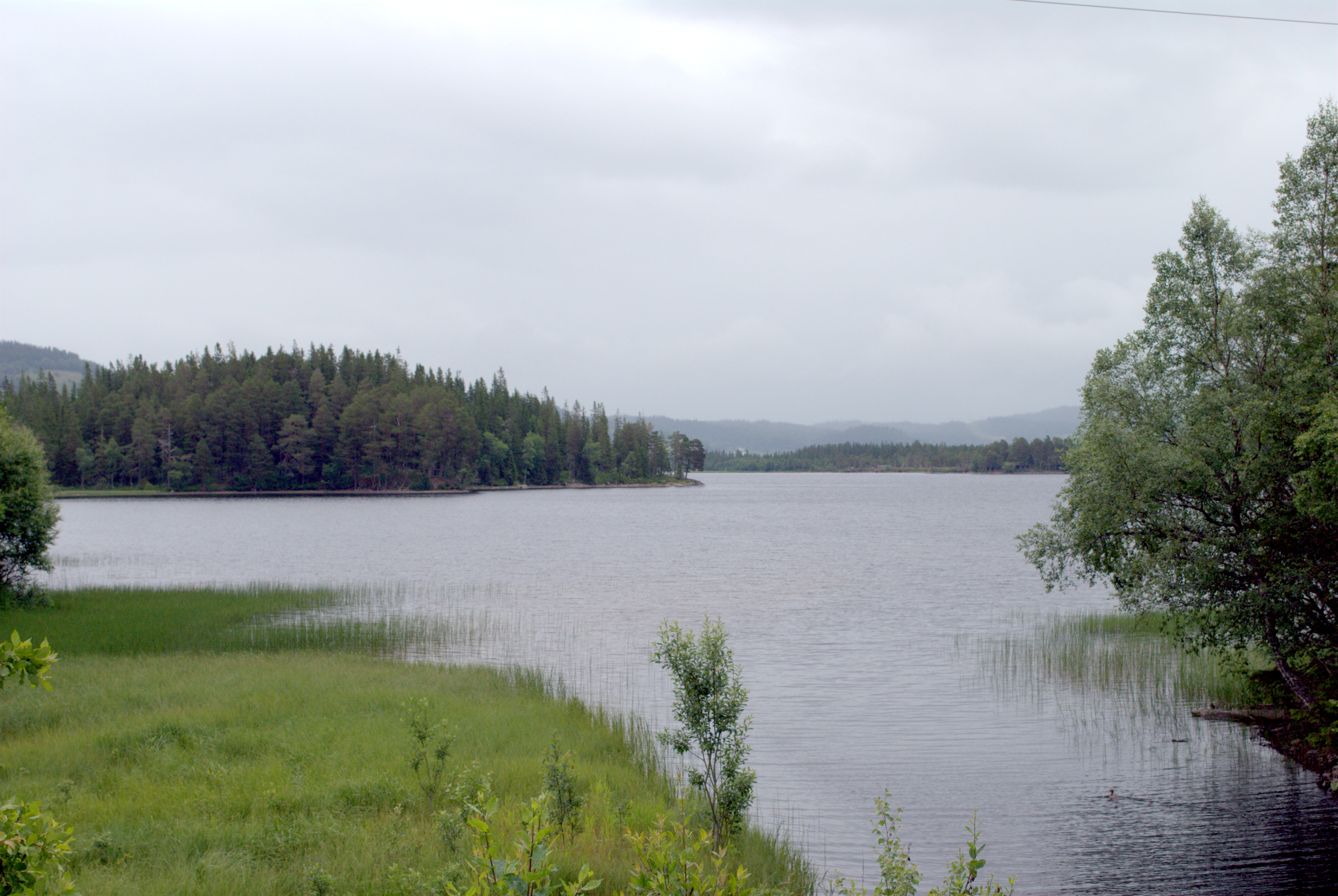
Hostovatnet

Hostovatnet is a lake in Trøndelag county, Norway. The 3.14-square-kilometre (1.21 sq mi) lake lies in Orkland Municipality. The village of Hoston is located on the northeastern shore of the lake.

The water leaves the lake primarily through the river Vorma which flows east to the village of Vormstad where it joins the river Orkla. The lake Gangåsvatnet lies about 7 kilometres (4.3 mi) to the north. At the southern tip of Hostovatnet there is a short connection to the lake Ringavatnet. The lake is good for fishing trout and Arctic char.

== See also ==
- List of lakes in Norway
