= Stemshaug =

Village in Aure Municipality, Norway

- Village
- Interactive map of Stemshaug
- Location within Møre og Romsdal Location within Norway
- Coordinates: 63.3267°N 8.7054°E
- Country: Norway
- Region: Western Norway
- County: Møre og Romsdal
- District: Nordmøre
- Municipality: Aure Municipality
- Elevation: 2 m (6.6 ft)
- Time zone: UTC+01:00 (CET)
  - Summer (DST): UTC+02:00 (CEST)
- Post Code: 6690 Aure

Stemshaug is a village in Aure Municipality in Møre og Romsdal county, Norway. The village is located on the mainland along the southern shore of the Torsetsundet strait and along the Norwegian County Road 364, about 13 kilometres (8.1 mi) to the northeast of the village of Aure.

== History ==
The village of Stemshaug was the administrative centre of the old Stemshaug Municipality. The very old Stemshaug Church is located in the village.
