= Gangåsvatnet =

Lake in Norway

- Interactive map of the lake
- Location: Orkland Municipality, Trøndelag
- Coordinates: 63.2745°N 09.6360°E
- Basin countries: Norway
- Max. length: 3 kilometres (1.9 mi)
- Max. width: 4 kilometres (2.5 mi)
- Surface area: 5.5 km^{2} (2.1 sq mi)
- Shore length^{1}: 19.6 kilometres (12.2 mi)
- Surface elevation: 153 metres (502 ft)
- References: NVE
- ^{1} Shore length is not a well-defined measure.

Gangåsvatnet is a lake in Orkland Municipality in Trøndelag county, Norway. The 5.49-square-kilometre (1,360-acre) lake is located about 9 kilometres (5.6 mi) southwest of the town of Orkanger and about 6 kilometres (3.7 mi) west of the village of Fannrem in the Orkdalen valley.

The water flows into the lake from the Songa river which flows out of the lake Våvatnet which is also in Orkland Municipality. The water leaves the lake through the Skjenaldelva river which ultimately flows into the Trondheimsfjord. The lake Hostovatnet lies about 7 kilometres (4.3 mi) south of the lake.

== See also ==
- List of lakes in Norway
