= Ytre Snillfjord =

Village in Heim Municipality, Norway

Ytre Snillfjord Vennastranda
- Village
- Interactive map of Ytre Snillfjord
- Location within Trøndelag Location within Norway
- Coordinates: 63.3542°N 09.2855°E
- Country: Norway
- Region: Central Norway
- County: Trøndelag
- District: Fosen
- Municipality: Heim Municipality
- Elevation: 12 m (39 ft)
- Time zone: UTC+01:00 (CET)
  - Summer (DST): UTC+02:00 (CEST)
- Post Code: 7257 Snillfjord

Ytre Snillfjord is a village in Heim Municipality in Trøndelag county, Norway. The village is located along the Snillfjorden near where it joins the Hemnfjorden. It is located about 13 kilometres (8.1 mi) west of the village of Krokstadøra and about 12 kilometres (7.5 mi) northeast of the village of Kyrksæterøra. The lake Våvatnet lies about 16 kilometres (9.9 mi) southeast of the village.
