= Stemshaug Municipality =

Former municipality in Møre og Romsdal, Norway

Stemshaug Municipality Stemshaug herred
- Former municipality
- Møre og Romsdal within Norway

- Stemshaug within Møre og Romsdal
- Coordinates: 63.3267°N 8.7054°E
- Country: Norway
- County: Møre og Romsdal
- District: Nordmøre
- Established: 1 July 1914
  - Preceded by: Aure Municipality
- Disestablished: 1 Jan 1965
  - Succeeded by: Aure Municipality
- Administrative centre: Stemshaug

Area (upon dissolution)
  - Total: 157.3 km^{2} (60.7 sq mi)
  - Rank: #365 in Norway
- Highest elevation: 779 m (2,556 ft)

Population (1964)
  - Total: 847
  - Rank: #496 in Norway
  - Density: 5.4/km^{2} (14/sq mi)
  - Change (10 years): ▼ −5.8%
- Demonym: Stemshauging

Official language
  - Norwegian form: Neutral
- Time zone: UTC+01:00 (CET)
  - Summer (DST): UTC+02:00 (CEST)
- ISO 3166 code: NO-1568

Stemshaug is a former municipality in Møre og Romsdal county, Norway. The 157.3-square-kilometre (60.7 sq mi) municipality existed from 1914 until its dissolution in 1965. The municipality included the eastern part of the island of Skardsøya and the mainland to the east and south of there surrounding the Dromnessundet and Torsetsundet straits and the Årvågsfjorden. The Tjeldbergodden area on the mainland was also part of Stemshaug. The village of Stemshaug was the administrative centre of the municipality.

Prior to its dissolution in 1965, the 157.3-square-kilometre (60.7 sq mi) municipality was the 365th largest by area out of the 525 municipalities in Norway. Stemshaug Municipality was the 496th most populous municipality in Norway with a population of about 847. The municipality's population density was 5.4 inhabitants per square kilometre (14/sq mi) and its population had decreased by 5.8% over the previous 10-year period.

== General information ==
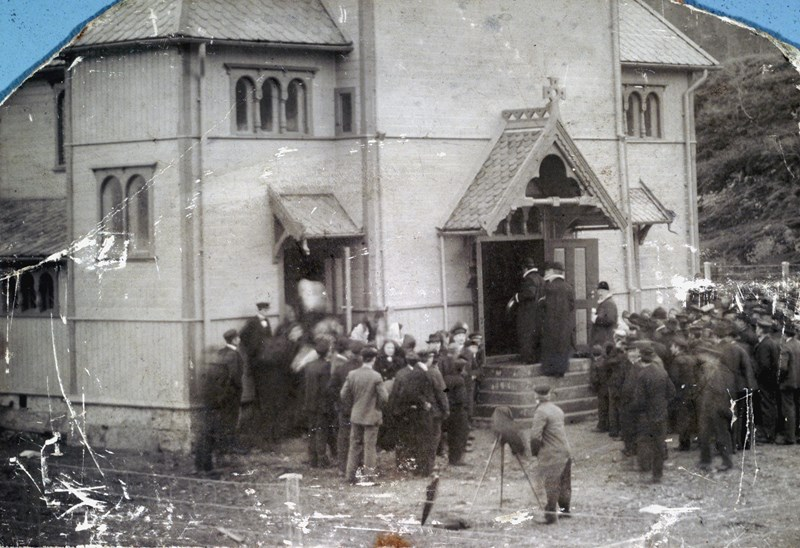
Consecration of the Stemshaug Church in 1908

The municipality of Stemshaug was established on 1 July 1914 when Aure Municipality was divided. The eastern district (population: 851) became the new Stemshaug Municipality and the western district (population: 2,372) continued on as Aure Municipality.

During the 1960s, there were many municipal mergers across Norway due to the work of the Schei Committee. On 1 January 1965, Stemshaug Municipality (population: 877) was merged with Aure Municipality (population: 2,203) and the parts of Valsøyfjord Municipality (population: 141) and Tustna Municipality (population: 85) that were located on the island of Ertvågøya, creating a new, larger Aure Municipality.

=== Name ===
The municipality is named after the old Stemshaug farm (Old Norse: Stefnishaugr) since the first Stemshaug Church was built there. The first element is stafn which means "stem of a ship" (the nearly vertical forward extension of the keel of a ship). This could refer to the steep hills around the farm and for two long, narrow headlands at the farm. The last element is haugr which means "cairn" or "burial mound".

=== Churches ===
The Church of Norway had one parish (sokn) within Stemshaug Municipality. At the time of the municipal dissolution, it was part of the Aure prestegjeld and the Ytre Nordmøre prosti (deanery) in the Diocese of Nidaros.

Churches in Stemshaug Municipality
Parish (sokn)	Church name	Location of the church	Year built
Stemshaug	Stemshaug Church	Stemshaug	1908

== Geography ==
The municipality was located in Nordmøre. It was located on the mainland and the eastern side of the island of Skardsøya. The Dromnessundet and Torsetsundet straits flowed through the municipality. The highest point in the municipality was the 779-metre (2,556 ft) tall mountain Steingeita on the border with Aure Municipality. Hitra Municipality was located to the north, Hemne Municipality was to the east and south, and Aure Municipality was to the south and west.

== Government ==
While it existed, Stemshaug Municipality was responsible for primary education (through 10th grade), outpatient health services, senior citizen services, welfare and other social services, zoning, economic development, and municipal roads and utilities. The municipality was governed by a municipal council of directly elected representatives. The mayor was indirectly elected by a vote of the municipal council. The municipality was under the jurisdiction of the Frostating Court of Appeal.

=== Municipal council ===
The municipal council (Herredsstyre) of Stemshaug Municipality was made up of 13 representatives that were elected to four-year terms. The tables below show the historical composition of the council by political party.

Stemshaug herredsstyre 1963–1964
Party name (in Norwegian)	Number of representatives
Local List(s) (Lokale lister)	13
Total number of members:	13
Note: On 1 January 1965, Stemshaug Municipality became part of Aure Municipality.

Stemshaug herredsstyre 1959–1963
Party name (in Norwegian)	Number of representatives
Local List(s) (Lokale lister)	13
Total number of members:	13

Stemshaug herredsstyre 1955–1959
Party name (in Norwegian)	Number of representatives
Local List(s) (Lokale lister)	13
Total number of members:	13

Stemshaug herredsstyre 1951–1955
Party name (in Norwegian)	Number of representatives
Labour Party (Arbeiderpartiet)	1
Local List(s) (Lokale lister)	11
Total number of members:	12

Stemshaug herredsstyre 1947–1951
Party name (in Norwegian)	Number of representatives
Labour Party (Arbeiderpartiet)	2
Local List(s) (Lokale lister)	10
Total number of members:	12

Stemshaug herredsstyre 1945–1947
Party name (in Norwegian)	Number of representatives
Labour Party (Arbeiderpartiet)	3
Liberal Party (Venstre)	5
Local List(s) (Lokale lister)	4
Total number of members:	12

Stemshaug herredsstyre 1937–1941*
Party name (in Norwegian)	Number of representatives
Labour Party (Arbeiderpartiet)	3
Local List(s) (Lokale lister)	9
Total number of members:	12
Note: Due to the German occupation of Norway during World War II, no elections were held for new municipal councils until after the war ended in 1945.

=== Mayors ===
The mayor (Norwegian: ordfører) of Stemshaug Municipality was the political leader of the municipality and the chairperson of the municipal council. The following people have held this position:

- 1914–1919: Ole Ulfsnes (SmP)
- 1919–1940: Halvor Romundset (V)
- 1945–1947: Halvor Romundset (V)
- 1947–1959: Knut O. Romundset
- 1959–1964: Hans Stemshaug (LL)

== See also ==
- List of former municipalities of Norway
