= Hemnes =

Hemnes may refer to:

- Hemnes, Akershus, a village in Aurskog-Høland Municipality in Akershus county, Norway
- Hemnes Municipality, in Nordland county, Norway
  - Hemnes Church, in the above municipality
  - Hemnesberget, a village in the above municipality
  - Hemnes IL, a sports club based in the above municipality

== See also ==
- Hemne (disambiguation)
