= Haim (disambiguation) =

Haim is a given name and surname.

Haim or Chaim or L'Chaim may also refer to:

- Haim (band), an American pop rock band
- Haims, a commune in the Vienne department in France
- Chamayan, a clan of the Gurjar ethnic group found in India and Pakistan who may also be known as Chaim
- L'Chaim Vodka, a line of kosher alcoholic beverages
- Oxford University L'Chaim Society, a former student society

== See also ==
- Hayim Association, an Israeli non-profit organisation supporting children with cancer
- Heim (disambiguation)
- Heym
