= Heims (surname) =

Heims is a surname. Notable people with the surname include:

- Jessica Heims (born 1998), American Paralympics athlete
- Jo Heims (1930–1978), American screenwriter

== See also ==
- Helms
