= Stemshaug Church =

Church in Møre og Romsdal, Norway

- Stemshaug kirke
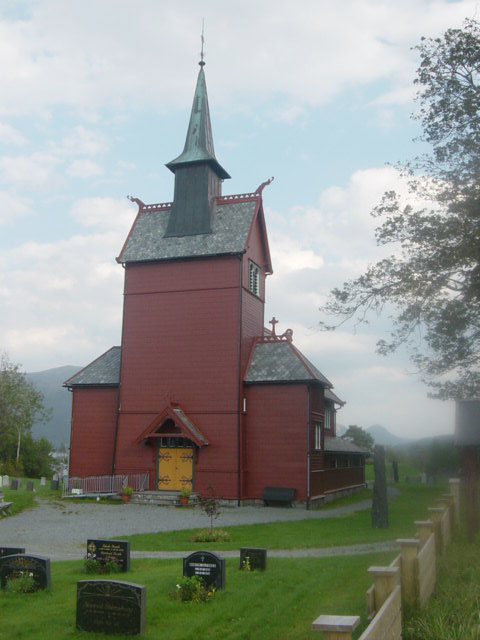
- View of the church
- Stemshaug Church
- 63°19′40″N 8°41′44″E
- Location: Aure Municipality, Møre og Romsdal
- Country: Norway
- Denomination: Church of Norway
- Churchmanship: Evangelical Lutheran

History
- Status: Parish church
- Founded: 1908
- Consecrated: 9 December 1908

Architecture
- Functional status: Active
- Architect: Hans Jakob Sparre
- Architectural type: Long church
- Style: Dragestil
- Completed: 1908 (118 years ago)

Specifications
- Capacity: 300
- Materials: Wood

Administration
- Diocese: Møre bispedømme
- Deanery: Ytre Nordmøre prosti
- Parish: Stemshaug
- Norwegian Cultural Heritage Site
- Type: Church
- Status: Not protected
- ID: 85566

Stemshaug Church (Norwegian: Stemshaug kirke) is a parish church of the Church of Norway in Aure Municipality in Møre og Romsdal county, Norway. It is located in the village of Stemshaug. It is the church for the Stemshaug parish which is part of the Ytre Nordmøre prosti (deanery) in the Diocese of Møre. The red, wooden church was built in a long church design in 1908 by the architect Hans Jakob Sparre. The architect used a dragestil design for the church. The church seats about 300 people.

== History ==
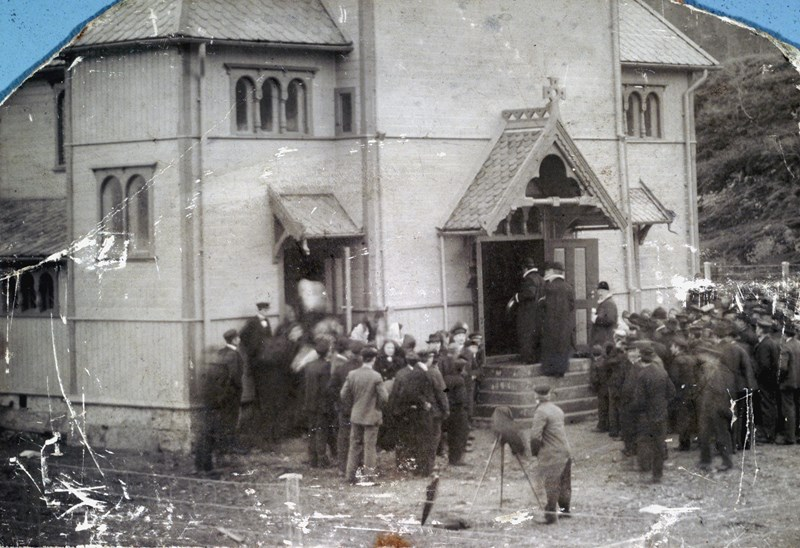
View of the church at its consecration in 1908.

On 21 November 1905, a royal resolution authorized the creation of a new parish within the prestegjeld of Aure. The new parish would cover the northeastern part of the municipality of Aure. On 9 December 1907, another royal resolution authorized the construction of a new church at Stemshaug to serve the new parish. It was designed by Hans Jacob Sparre. The church is larger, but almost identical to the Sæle Church in Sogndal Municipality which Sparre designed as well. The church has a tower on the west end of the nave and a choir on the east end. There are two sacristies that flank the choir to the north and south. The new church was consecrated on 9 December 1908. The church was renovated in 1958.

== See also ==
- List of churches in Møre
