= Heim Peninsula =

Peninsula in Nunavut, Canada

Coordinates: 76°32′N 084°30′W

The Heim Peninsula is located on the southern coast of Ellesmere Island, a part of the Qikiqtaaluk Region of the Canadian territory of Nunavut. The Sydkap Fiord is to the west, and the Harbour Fiord is to the east. Landslip Island is approximately 1 km (0.62 mi) off the southeastern shore.

The Inuit hamlet of Grise Fiord (Aujuittuq, "Place That Never Thaws") is approximately 54 km (34 mi) to the east.
