= Heym =

Heym is a surname. Notable people with the surname include:

- Georg Heym (1887–1912), German author
- Stefan Heym (1913–2001), German author

== See also ==
- Heym (gun manufacturer)
- Chayyim, the basis for this name
- Haim (disambiguation)
- Heim (surname)
