= Heim (surname) =

Heim is a surname. Notable people with the surname include:

- Albert Heim (1849–1937), Swiss geologist
- Aribert Heim (1914–1992), Austrian doctor and formerly one of the world's most wanted Nazi war criminals
- Bruno Heim (1911–2003), Vatican's first Apostolic Nuncio to Great Britain
- Burkhard Heim (1925–2001), German physicist
- Corey Heim (born 2002), Racing Driver
- Emmy Heim (1885–1954), Austrian/Canadian soprano singer
- Ernst Ludwig Heim (1747–1834), German physician
- Ferdinand Heim (1895–1977), German general (not to be confused with Aribert Ferdinand Heim)
- François Joseph Heim (1787–1865), French painter
- Irene Heim, American linguist, specialist in semantics
- Jacques Heim (1899–1967), French (Parisian) designer and manufacturer
- Jonah Heim, baseball player, catcher for the Oakland Athletics and Texas Rangers
- Kay Heim (1917–2015), Canadian-American professional baseball player
- Scott Heim (born 1966), American novelist
- Sverre Heim (born 1951), Norwegian physician and cancer researcher

Fictional characters:

- Rick Heim, a correctional officer in the HBO drama Oz

== See also ==
- Heym
