= Heims Lake =

Lake in the state of Minnesota, United States

- Location within Minnesota
- Location: Chisago County, Minnesota
- Coordinates: 45°18′57″N 92°59′39″W
- Type: lake

Heims Lake is a lake in Chisago County, Minnesota, in the United States.

Heims Lake was named for the family of Conrad Heim, an early settler.

== See also ==
- List of lakes in Minnesota
