= Kyrksæterøra =

Village in Heim Municipality, Norway

- Village
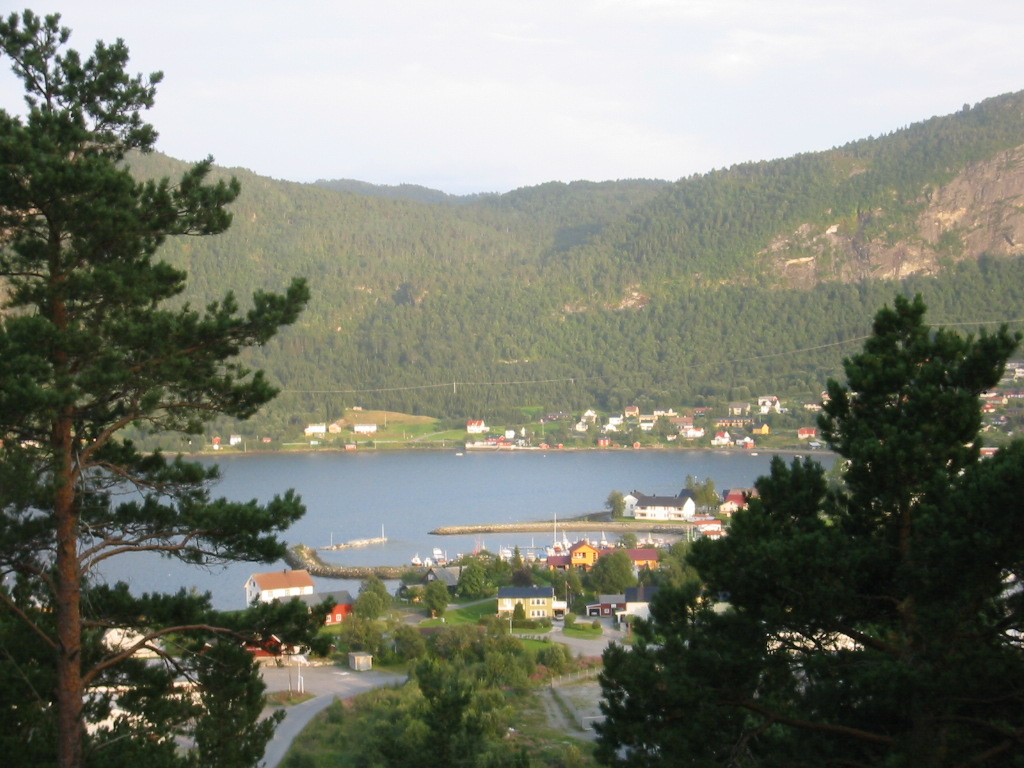
- View of the village
- Interactive map of Kyrksæterøra
- Location within Trøndelag Location within Norway
- Coordinates: 63.2906°N 09.0891°E
- Country: Norway
- Region: Central Norway
- County: Trøndelag
- District: Fosen
- Municipality: Heim Municipality

Area
  - Total: 2.38 km^{2} (0.92 sq mi)
- Elevation: 3 m (9.8 ft)

Population (2024)
  - Total: 2,598
  - Density: 1,092/km^{2} (2,830/sq mi)
- Time zone: UTC+01:00 (CET)
  - Summer (DST): UTC+02:00 (CEST)
- Post Code: 7200 Kyrksæterøra

Kyrksæterøra is the administrative center of Heim Municipality in Trøndelag county, Norway. The village was known as the "white town of Hemnfjorden" at one time because there were only white houses. It is located at the end of Hemnfjorden, about 5 kilometres (3.1 mi) southwest of the village of Holla. The villages of Hellandsjøen and Heim both lie to the north and the village of Vinjeøra lies to the south. Hemne Church is located in the village. Norwegian County Road 680 passes through the village. The newspaper Søvesten has been published in Kyrksæterøra since 1994.

The 2.38-square-kilometre (590-acre) village has a population (2024) of 2,598 and a population density of 1,092 inhabitants per square kilometre (2,830/sq mi).

At one time, there was a shoe factory, a shipyard, a lumber mill, and fish processing plant in the area. Kyrksæterøra was bombed during World War II, but there were no deaths and there was minimal damage. Nearby, the Nazis also had a large camp for Russian prisoners-of-war.

== Name ==
The name of the village is a compound name combining Kyrksæter and the suffix -øra. The first element of the name is the name of the old farm Kyrksæter (Old Norse: Kirkjusoðin). The first part of the farm name is kirkja which means "church" (since the first Hemne Church was built on this site). The last part of the farm name is the old name Soðin or Soðvin, which is a compound of the river name Søo and the word vin which means "meadow" or "pasture". The name of the river is derived from the verb sjóða which means "seethe" or "boil" (referring to the froth of the waterfalls in the river). The last element of the village name is the suffix -øra which is the articulated form of ør which means "sandbank (at the mouth of a river)". The name was spelled Kirksæterøra before the early 20th century.

== Notable people ==
- Erik Hoftun (b. 1969), a former football defender with 30 caps for Norway national football team

== Media gallery ==
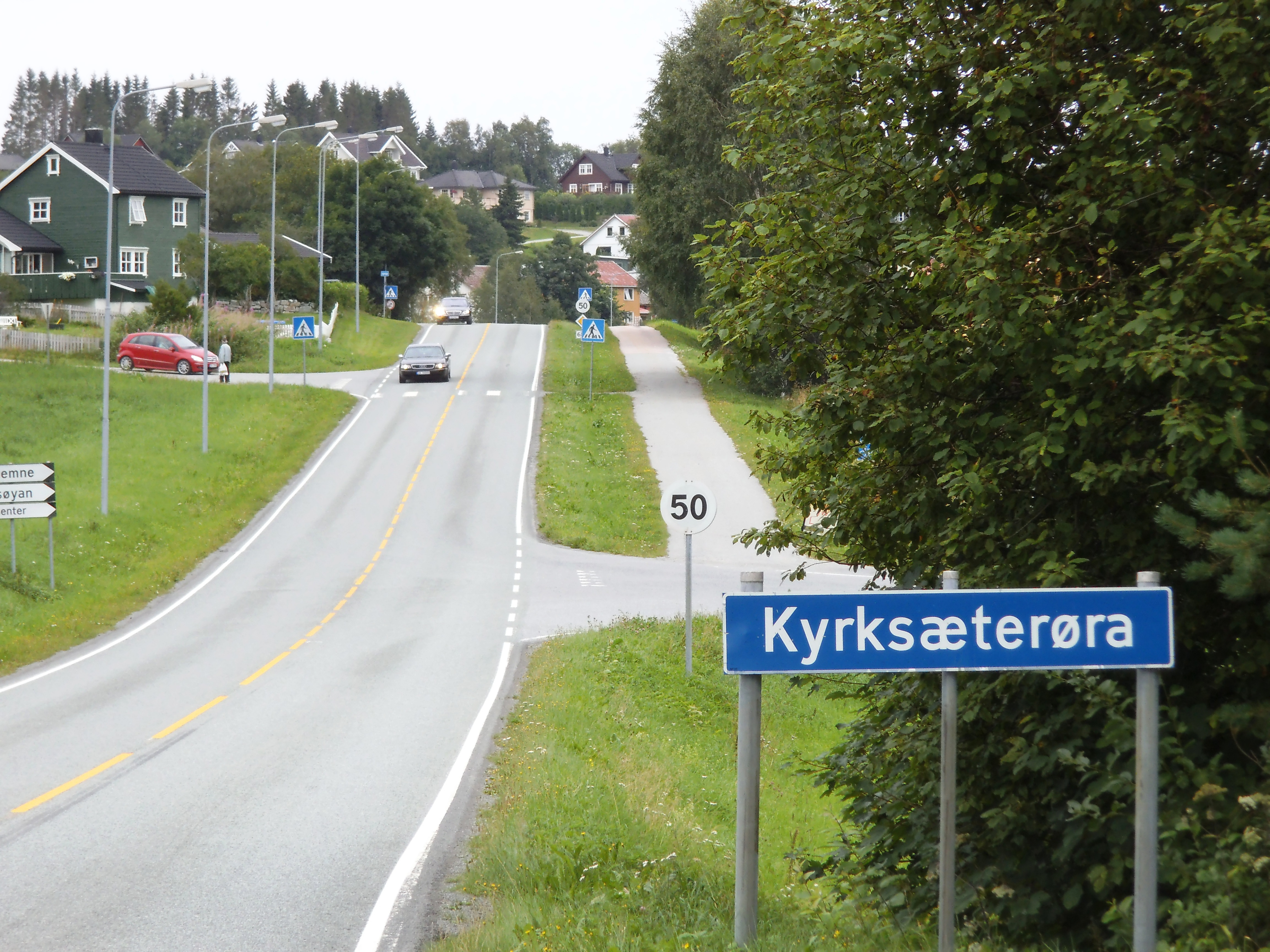

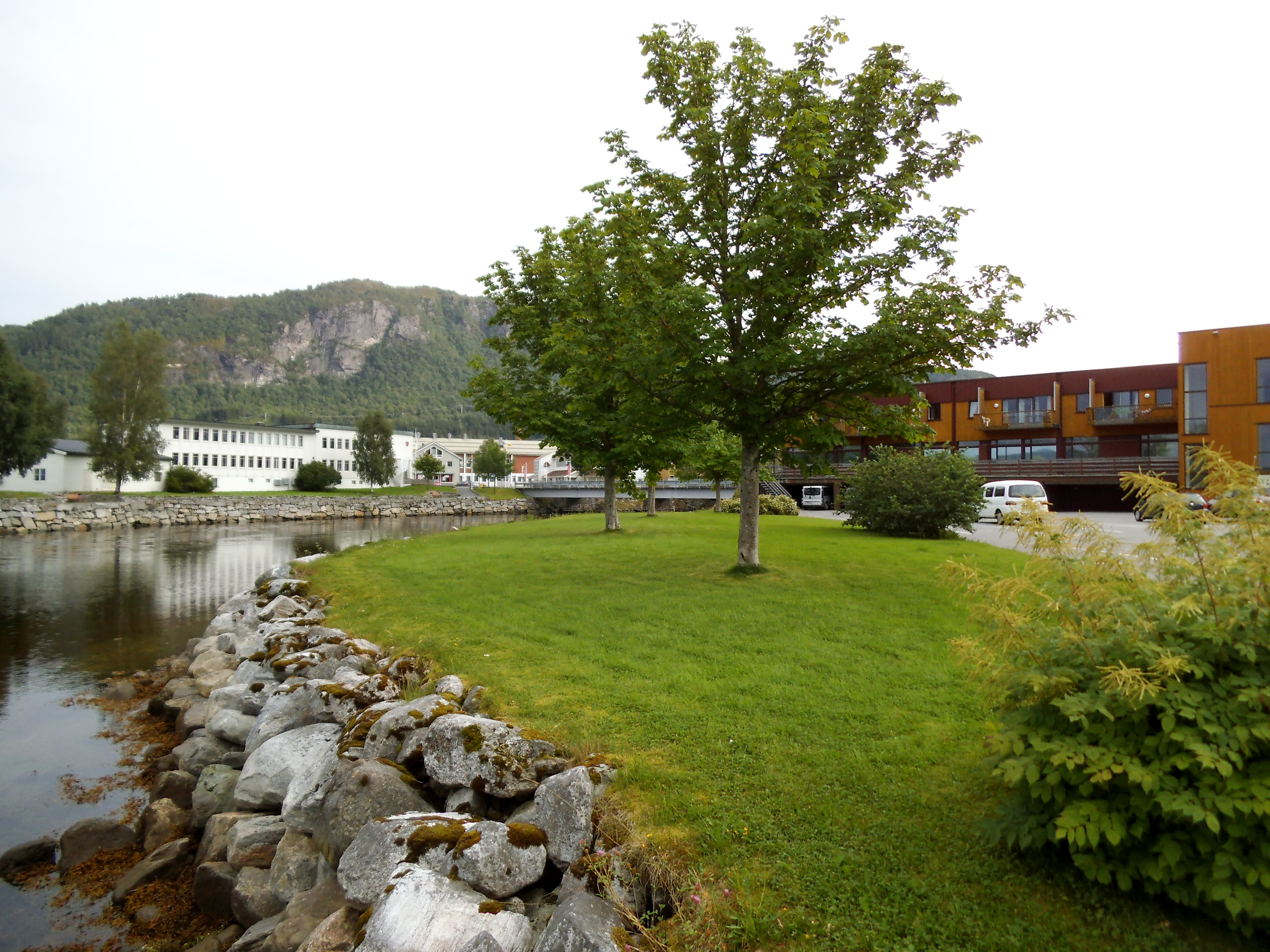

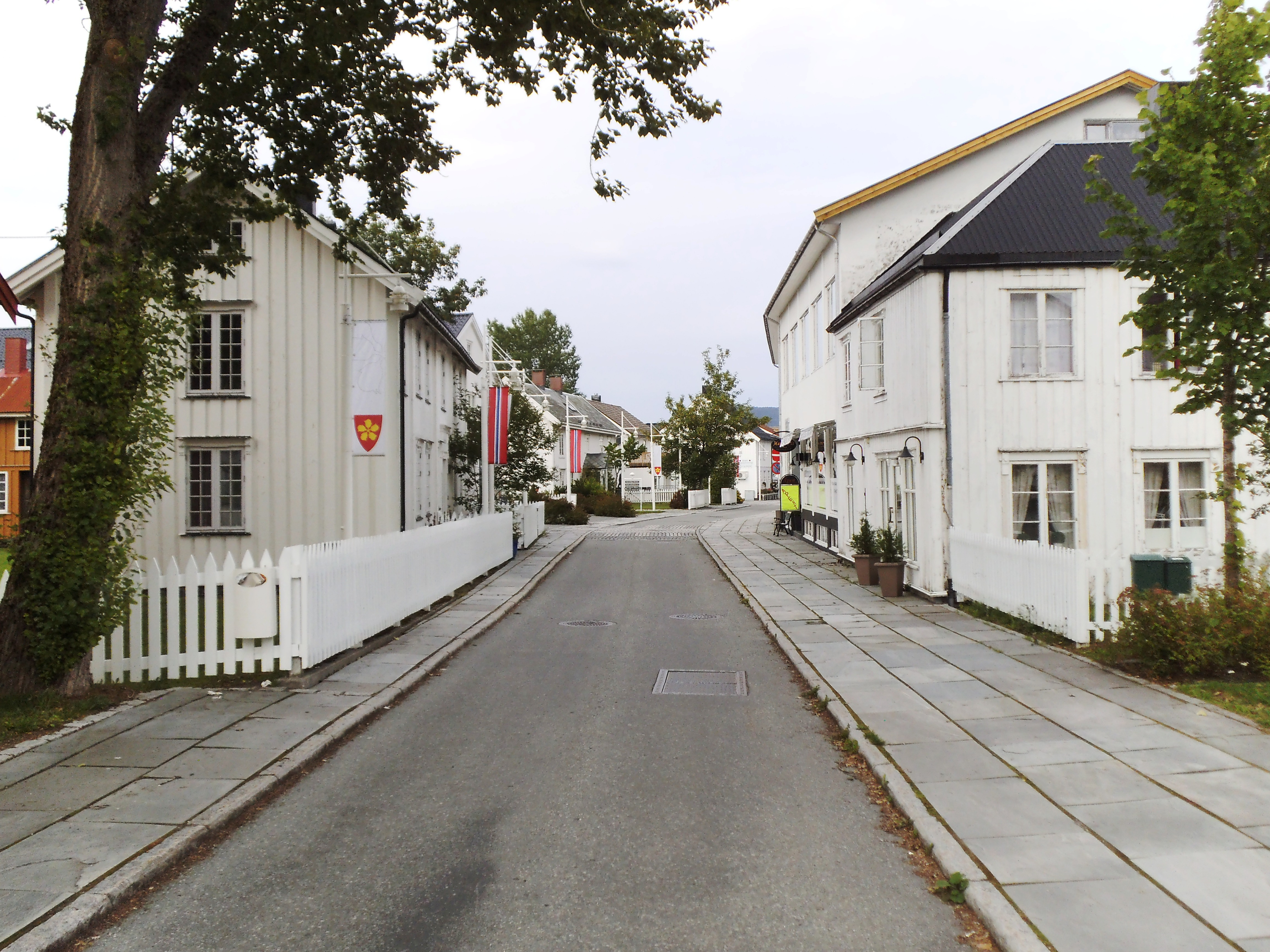

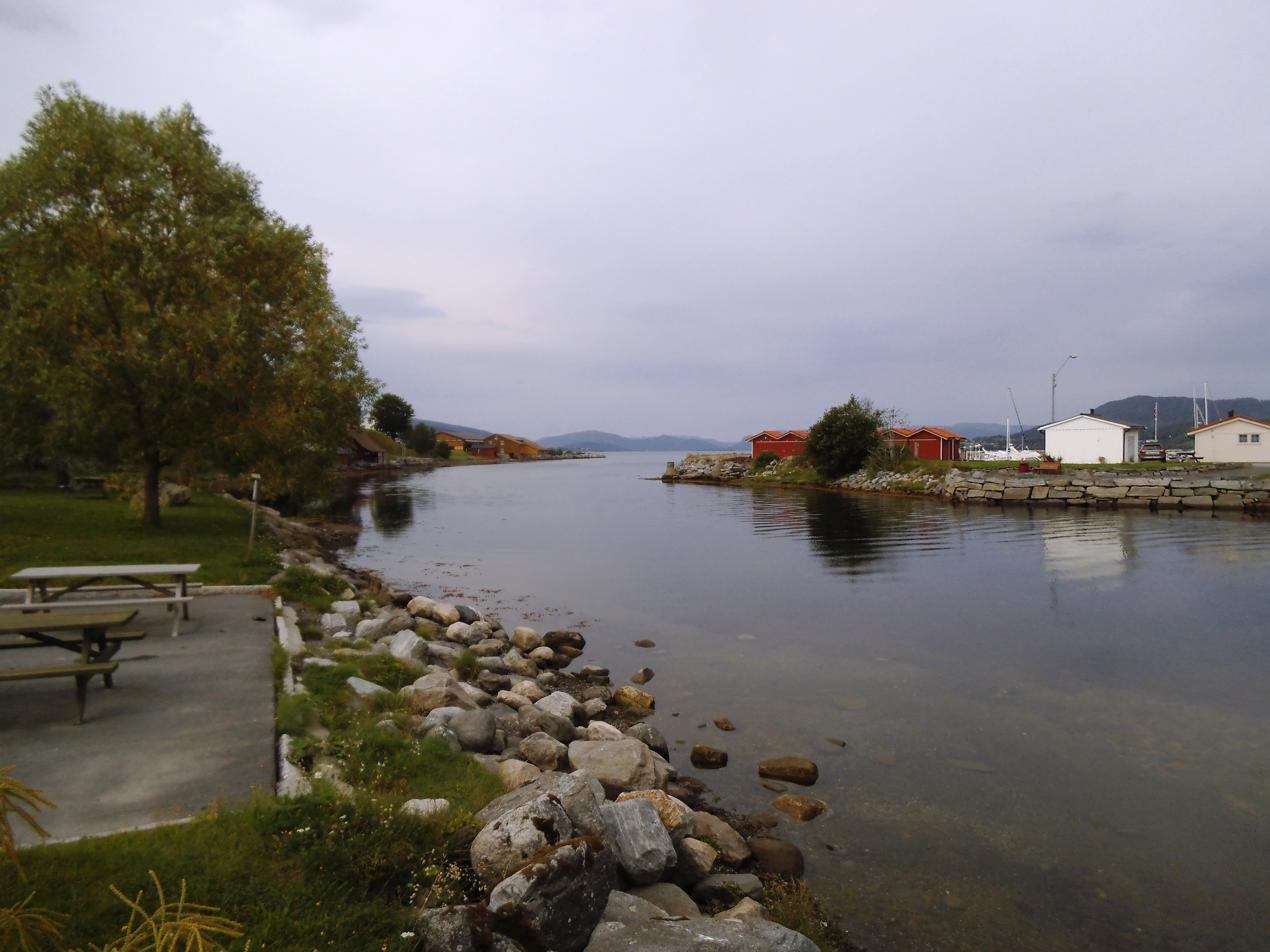

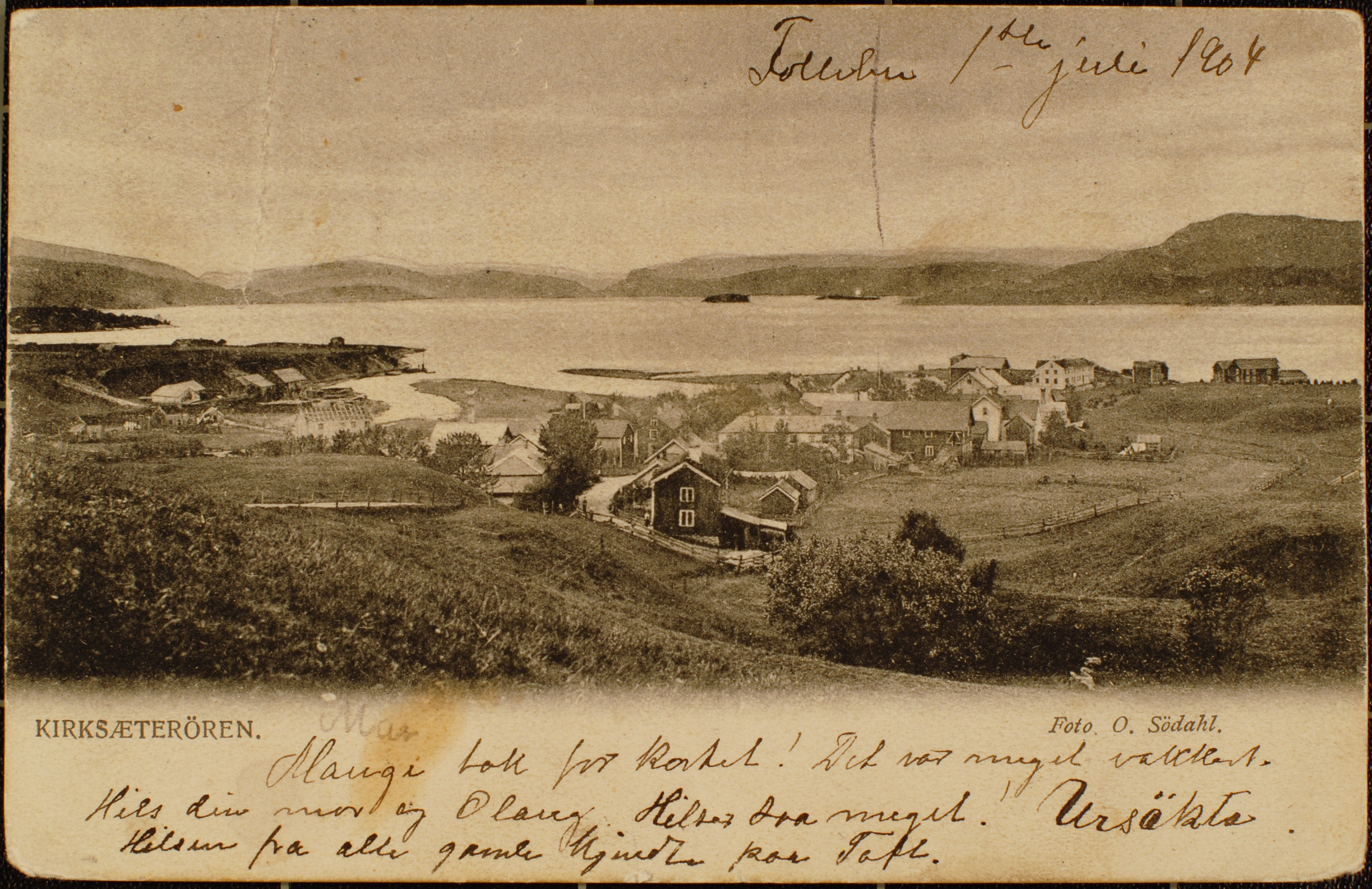
