= Krokstadøra =

Village in Orkland Municipality, Norway

- Village
- Interactive map of Krokstadøra
- Location within Trøndelag Location within Norway
- Coordinates: 63.4004°N 09.5023°E
- Country: Norway
- Region: Central Norway
- County: Trøndelag
- District: Fosen
- Municipality: Orkland Municipality
- Elevation: 14 m (46 ft)
- Time zone: UTC+01:00 (CET)
  - Summer (DST): UTC+02:00 (CEST)
- Post Code: 7257 Snillfjord

Krokstadøra is a village located in the western end of Orkland Municipality in Trøndelag county, Norway. The population was in 2019 about 285. Krokstadøra is located close to the end of Snillfjorden, on the north side of the fjord, just west of the Bergselva river.

== History ==
Krokstadøra was the administrative centre of Snillfjord Municipality until 2020 when it became a part of Orkland Municipality.

County road 714 previously passed through the village, but a bypass was opened on the 22nd of February 2019.
