= Snillfjorden =

Fjord in Trøndelag, Norway

- Interactive map of the fjord
- Location: Trøndelag county, Norway
- Coordinates: 63.36754°N 9.33288°E
- Type: Fjord
- Primary inflows: Rivers Snildalselva and Bergselva
- Primary outflows: Hemnfjorden
- Basin countries: Norway
- Max. length: 14 kilometres (8.7 mi)
- Max. width: 2 kilometres (1.2 mi)

Snillfjorden is a fjord that branches off the main Hemnfjorden in Heim Municipality and Orkland Municipality in Trøndelag county, Norway. The 14-kilometre (8.7 mi) long fjord starts at the village of Krokstadøra where the rivers Snildalselva and Bergselva empty into the fjord. The mouth of the Snillfjorden is at the village of Ytre Snillfjord where it joins the larger Hemnfjorden. There are small settlements along the north and south shores of the fjord, but they do not all have road connections. There is a road that follows the southern coastline for about half of the fjord, but the rest of the coastline is without roads.

== See also ==
- List of Norwegian fjords
