= Hemne Church =

Church in Trøndelag, Norway

- Hemne kirke
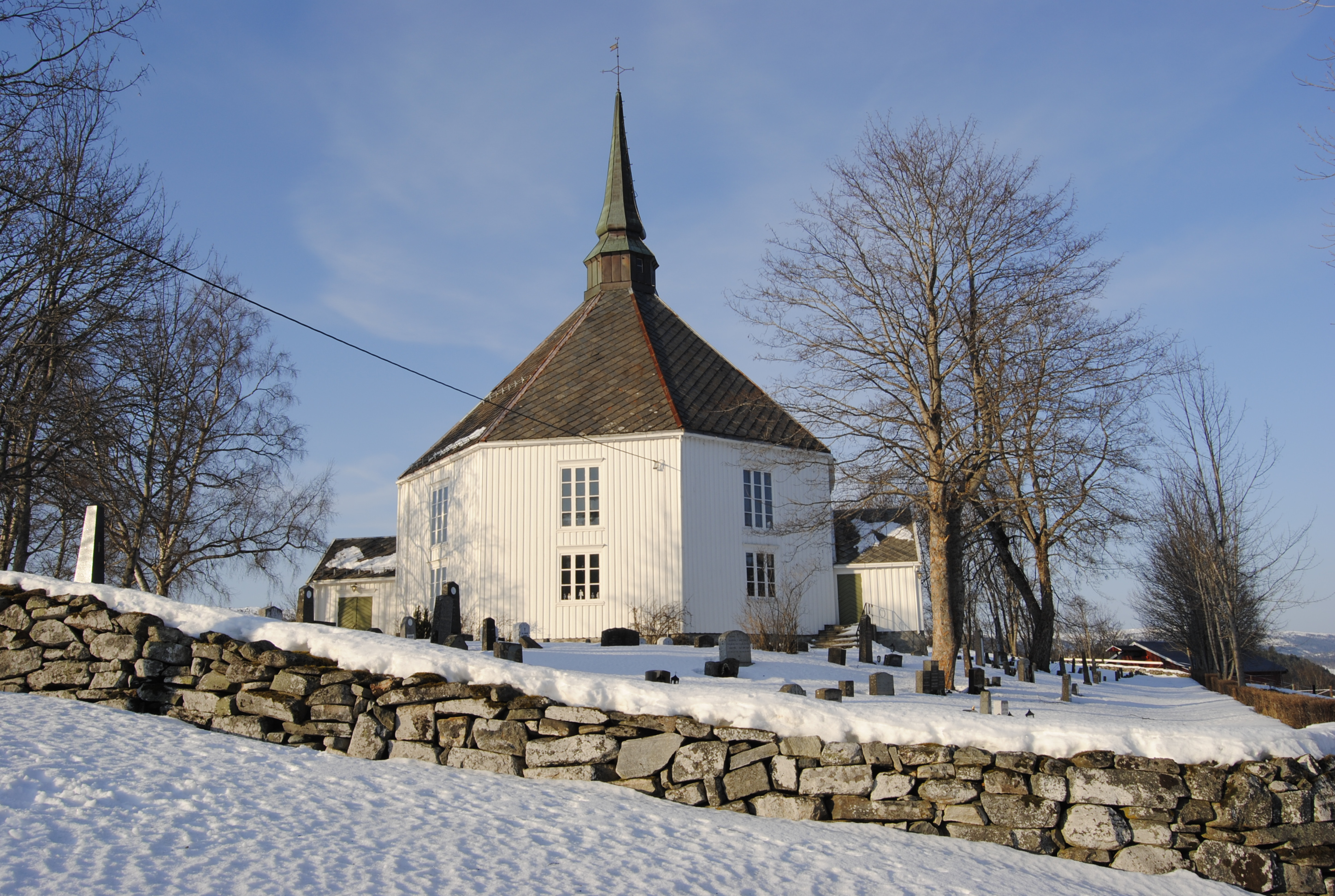
- View of the church
- Hemne Church
- 63.2872808489°N 09.079302996°E
- Location: Heim Municipality, Trøndelag
- Country: Norway
- Denomination: Church of Norway
- Churchmanship: Evangelical Lutheran

History
- Status: Parish church
- Founded: 14th century
- Consecrated: 29 June 1817

Architecture
- Functional status: Active
- Architect: Jakob Kirkebygger
- Architectural type: Octagonal
- Completed: 1817 (209 years ago)

Specifications
- Capacity: 450
- Materials: Wood

Administration
- Diocese: Nidaros bispedømme
- Deanery: Orkdal prosti
- Parish: Hemne
- Norwegian Cultural Heritage Site
- Type: Church
- Status: Automatically protected
- ID: 84543

Hemne Church (Norwegian: Hemne kirke) is a parish church of the Church of Norway in Heim Municipality in Trøndelag county, Norway. It is located in the village of Kyrksæterøra. It is the church for the Hemne parish which is part of the Orkdal prosti (deanery) in the Diocese of Nidaros. The white, wooden church was built in a octagonal design in 1817 using plans drawn up by the builder Jakob Kirkebygger ("Jacob the church builder"). The church seats about 450 people.

== History ==
The earliest existing historical records of the church date back to the year 1589 when it was referred to as the "Hemne Church of Saint Margrethae" (Sanctæ Margrettæ kircke wdi Hemne), but the church was not new that year. The church was a wooden stave church that was likely built in the 14th century. Descriptions of the altarpiece in the old church were dated to the Late Middle Ages. During the 17th and 18th centuries, the church was expanded by building timber-framed transepts to create a cruciform floor plan.

In 1814, this church served as an election church (Norwegian: valgkirke). Together with more than 300 other parish churches across Norway, it was a polling station for elections to the 1814 Norwegian Constituent Assembly which wrote the Constitution of Norway. This was Norway's first national elections. Each church parish was a constituency that elected people called "electors" who later met together in each county to elect the representatives for the assembly that was to meet at Eidsvoll Manor later that year.

On the night of the 14th-15 December 1815, the church was struck by lightning and it burned down. The church was quickly replaced with the present church building on a new site about 20 metres (66 ft) to the north of the old church site. Construction on the wooden, octagonal building began in March 1816 and was completed and consecrated on 29 June 1817. The church was built by a man called Jakob Kirkebygger ("Jacob the church builder"). The present church sits on the same site as the old church, with a graveyard surrounding the church.

== Media gallery ==
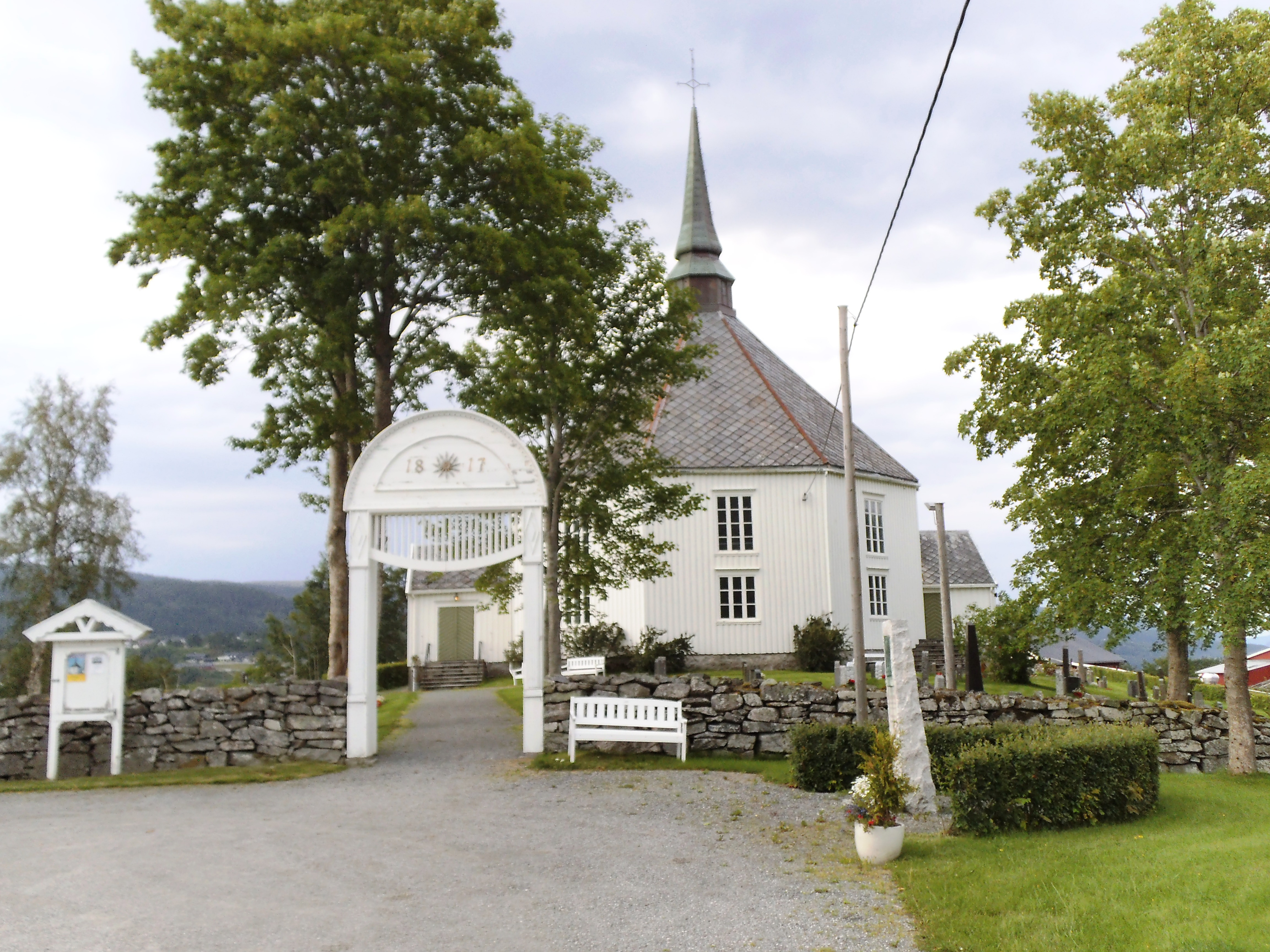

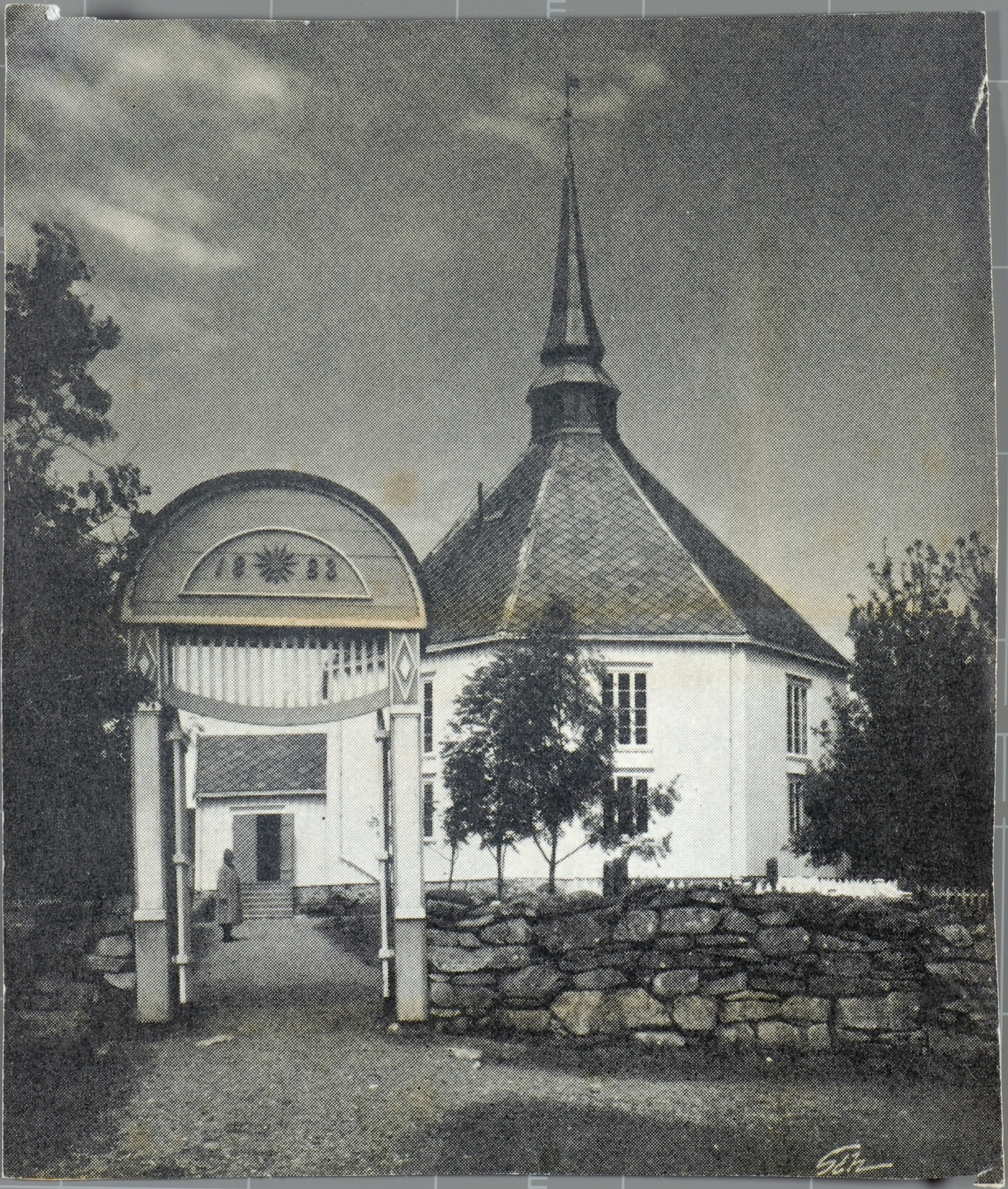

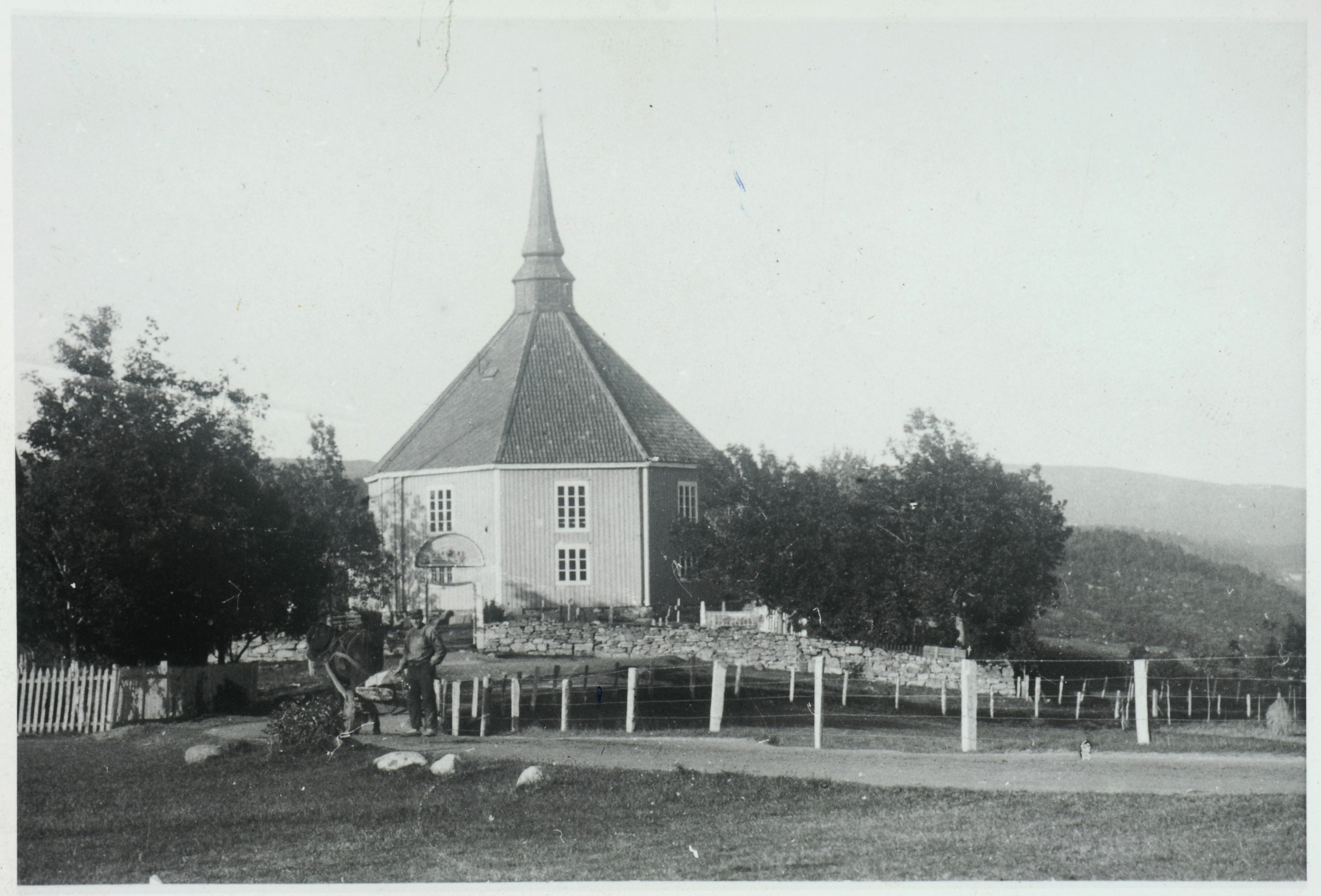

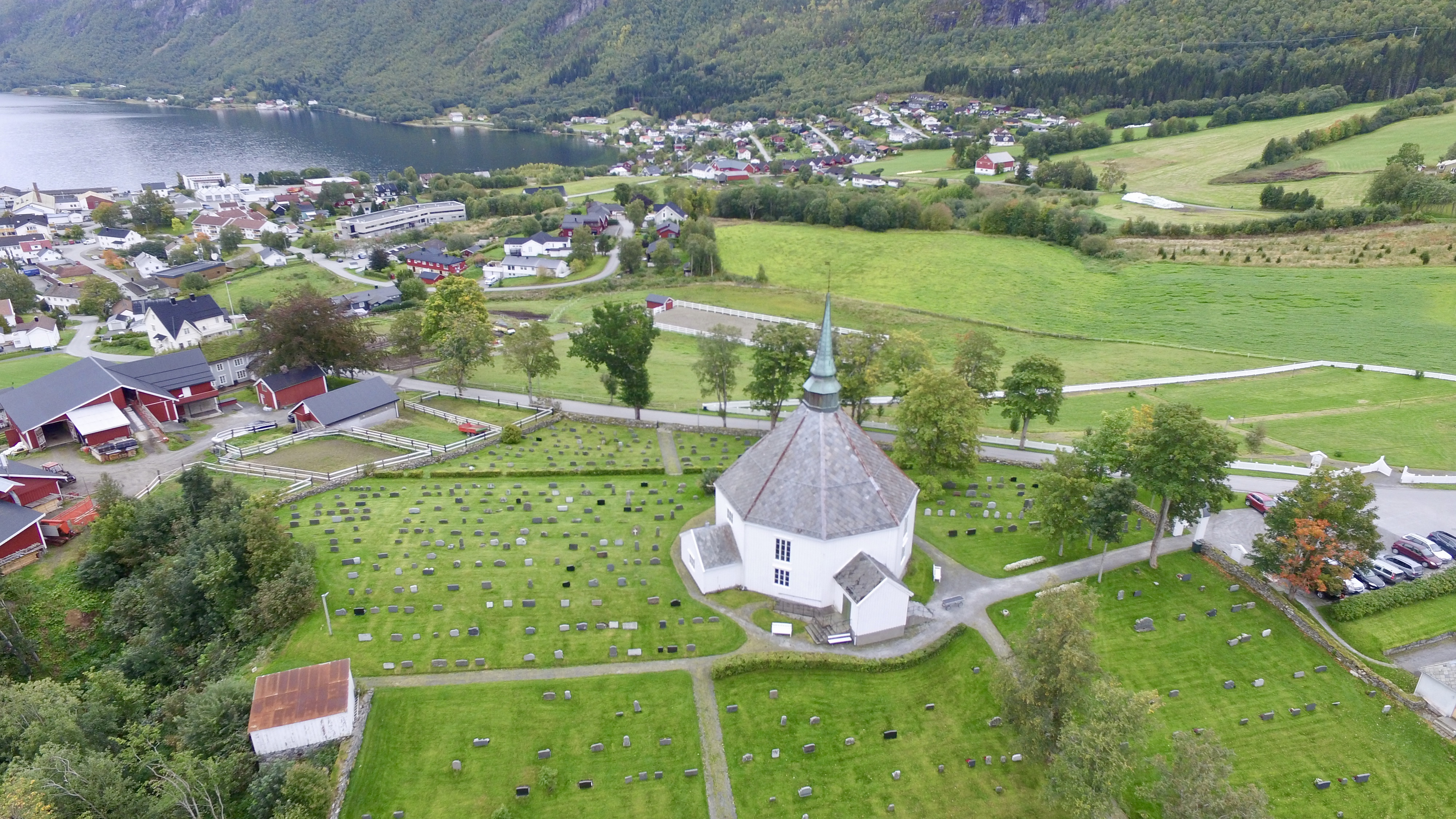

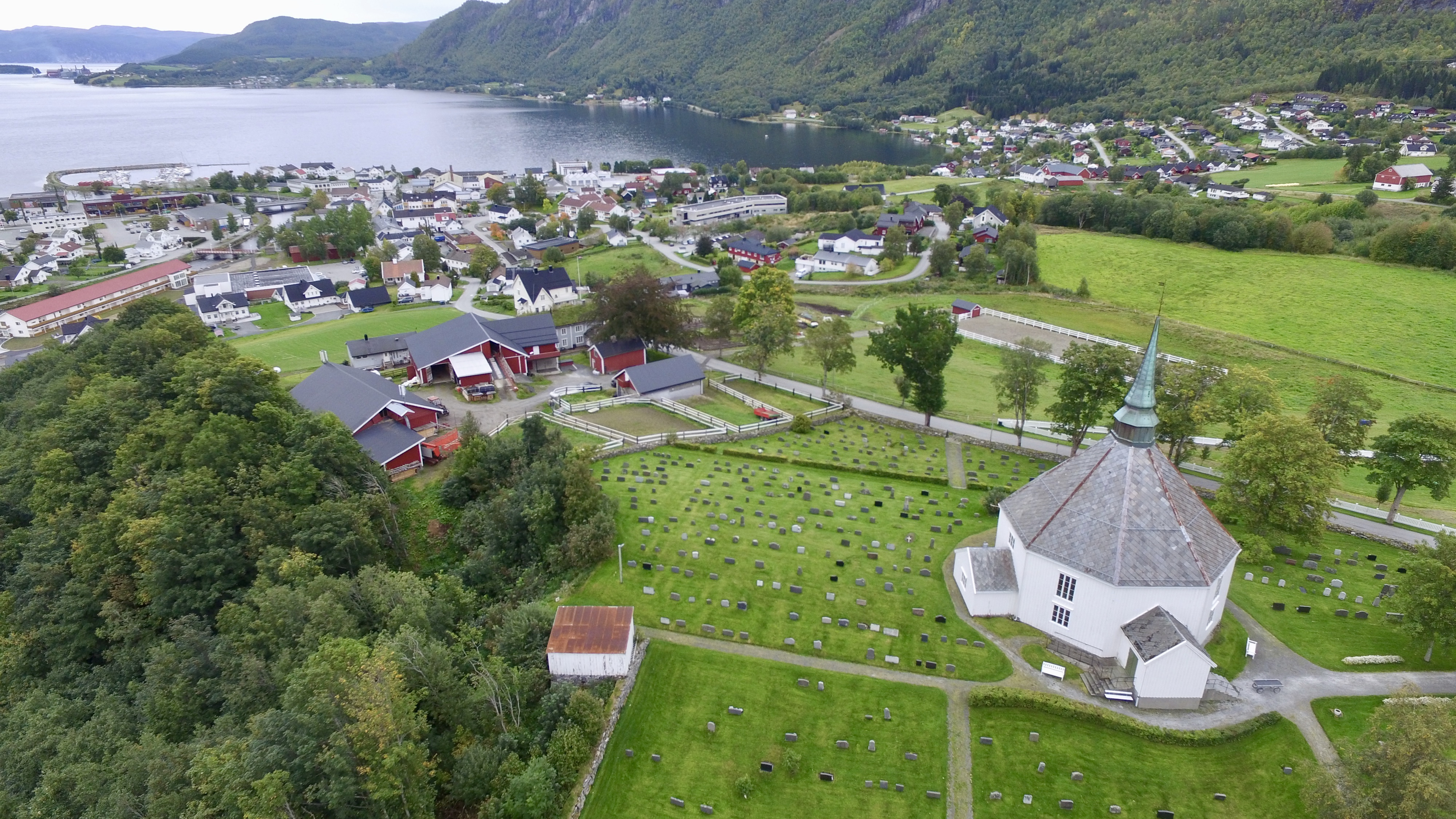

== See also ==
- List of churches in Nidaros
