= Heim (village) =

Village in Heim Municipality, Norway

- Village
- Interactive map of Heim
- Location within Trøndelag Location within Norway
- Coordinates: 63.4190°N 09.0824°E
- Country: Norway
- Region: Central Norway
- County: Trøndelag
- District: Fosen
- Municipality: Heim Municipality
- Elevation: 82 m (269 ft)
- Time zone: UTC+01:00 (CET)
  - Summer (DST): UTC+02:00 (CEST)
- Post Code: 7206 Hellandsjøen

Heim is a village in Heim Municipality in Trøndelag county, Norway. The village is located on the western shore of the Hemnfjorden, about 8 kilometres (5.0 mi) east of the village of Hellandsjøen. Heim Church is located in the village. The village was the administrative centre of the old Heim Municipality that existed from 1911 until 1964 (different from the present-day municipality of Heim).

== Name ==
The village (originally the parish) is named after the old Heim farm (Old Norse: Heimr) since the first Heim Church was built there. The name is identical with the word heimr which means "home", "homestead", or "farm".
