= Hemnfjorden =

Fjord in Trøndelag, Norway

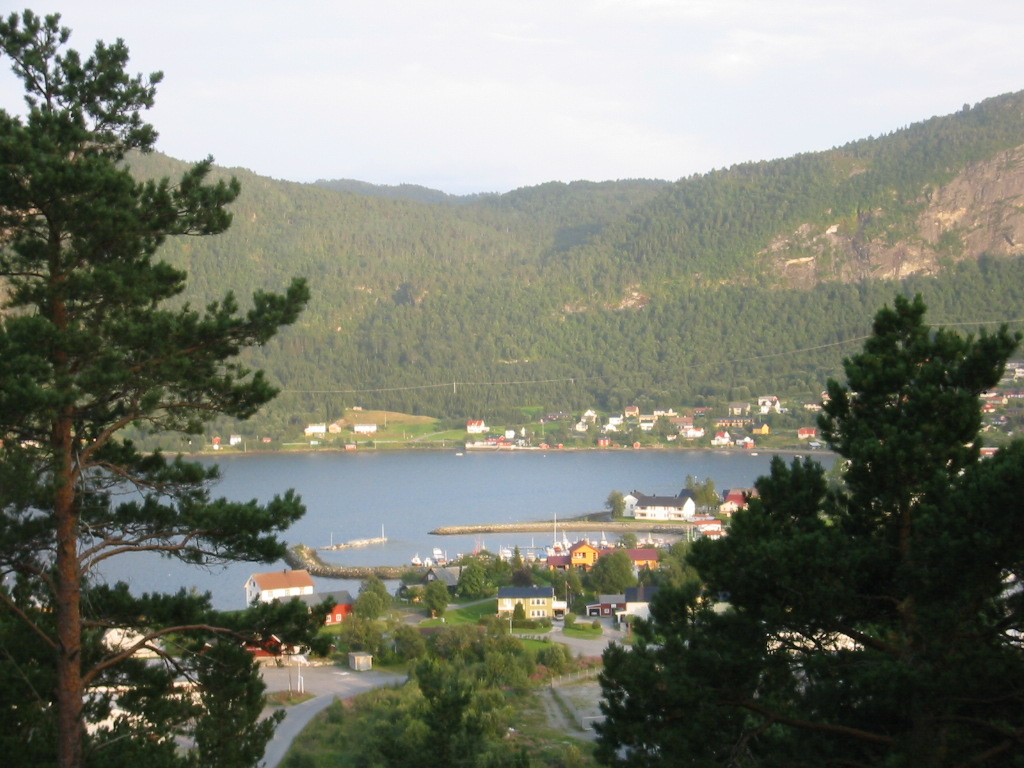
- View of the fjord
- Interactive map of the fjord
- Location: Trøndelag county, Norway
- Coordinates: 63.4512°N 09.0998°E
- Type: Fjord
- Primary inflows: Søo, Haugaelva
- Primary outflows: Trondheimsleia
- Basin countries: Norway
- Max. length: 25 kilometres (16 mi)
- Max. width: 5 kilometres (3.1 mi)
- Max. depth: 410 metres (1,350 ft)

Hemnfjorden is a fjord in Trøndelag county in Norway. The 25-kilometre (16 mi) long fjord forms the boundary between Heim Municipality, Hitra Municipality, and Orkland Municipality. The fjord begins at the village of Kyrksæterøra at the mouths of the rivers Søo and Haugaelva. The fjord flows northwards until it joins the Trondheimsleia. The Åstfjorden and Snillfjorden are smaller fjords which branch off the main Hemnfjorden to the east into Orkland Municipality. The deepest point in the fjord reaches 410 metres (1,350 ft) below sea level.

The village of Heim lies along the western shore of the fjord, and the municipal center of Hemne, Kyrksæterøra lies at the southern end of the fjord, and the village of Ytre Snillfjord lies on the southeast side of the fjord. The island of Hemnskjela lies at the mouth of the Hemnfjorden where it joins the Trondheimsleia.

== See also ==
- List of Norwegian fjords
