= Heidrun =

Heidrun or Heiðrún is a female name originally from Norse mythology.

== People ==
- Heidrun Barth (born 1961), German rower
- Heidrun Bluhm (born 1958), German politician
- Heidrun Breier (born 1971), Romanian-German-Chilean actress; see Las 2 Carolinas
- Heidrun Gerzymisch (born 1944), German translation scholar and professor
- Heidrun Hartmann (1942–2016), German botanist
- Heidrun Huwyler (born 1942), Swiss painter
- Heidrun Jänchen (born 1965), German science fiction and fantasy author
- Heidrun E. Mader (born 1977), German theologian and historian
- Heidrun Mohr-Mayer (1941–2014), German jeweler
- Heidrun Schumann (born 1954), German computer scientist
- Heidrun Silhavy (born 1956), Austrian politician

== Other ==
- Heidrun oil field, an oil and gas field discovered in 1985 in the Norwegian Sea
- Heidrun, a Danish Unmanned Aerial Vehicles (UAV) platform produced by Sky-Watch
