= Læraðr =

Tree in Norse mythology

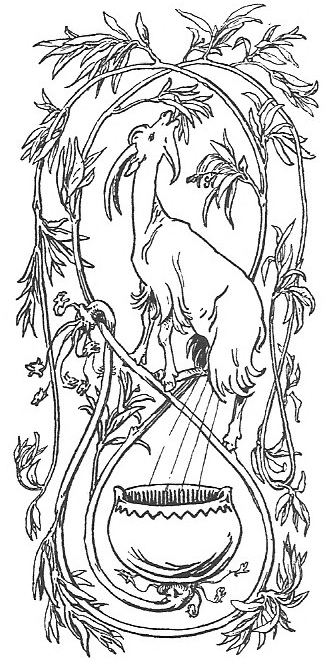
Heiðrún grazing Læraðr's foliage.

Læraðr (Laerad) is a tree in Norse mythology, often identified with Yggdrasil. It stands at the top of Valhöll. Two animals, the goat Heiðrún and the hart Eikþyrnir, graze its foliage.

== Etymology ==
The meaning of Læraðr / Léraðr is unclear. One of the meanings of læ is "harm", "betrayal". A possible translation of Læraðr could therefore be "arranger of betrayal", which would relate to Yggdrasill as the place of Odin's self-sacrifice. Another reading is sometimes suggested, *hléradr, whose first component means "shelter" and which could thus be rendered as "giver of protection".

== Attestations ==
=== Poetic Edda ===
Læraðr is mentioned in two stanzas of the Grímnismál:

Heidrûn the goat is called,
that stands o’er Odin’s hall,
and bites from Lærâd’s branches.
He a bowl shall fill
with the bright mead;
that drink shall never fail.

Eikthyrnir the hart is called,
that stands o’er Odin’s hall,
and bites from Lærâd’s branches;
from his horns fall
drops into Hvergelmir,
whence all waters rise:—

—Grímnismál (25, 26), Thorpe's translation

=== Prose Edda ===
Under the name Léraðr, it also appears in Gylfaginning:

The she-goat, she who is called Heidrún, stands up in Valhall and bites the needles from the limb of that tree which is very famous, and is called [Léraðr]; and from her udders mead runs so copiously, that she fills a tun every day. [...] Even more worthy of note is the hart Eikthyrnir, which stands in Valhall and bites from the limbs of the tree; and from his horns distils such abundant exudation that it comes down into Hvergelmir, and from thence fall those rivers called thus [...].

—Gylfaginning (39), Brodeur's translation

== Theories ==
According to John Lindow, the first reason to identify Lærad with Yggdrasill is "Lærad's location at Odin's hall, which would be at the center of the cosmos". Another argument is that many animals dwell in or around Yggdrasill, such as an eagle, the squirrel Ratatoskr, four stags, many snakes and the dragon Níðhöggr. Snorri also wrote that Hvergelmir was located under Yggdrasill (Gylfaginning, 15, 16).
