= Dvalin (disambiguation) =

Dvalin may mean:

- Dvalin was a ruler of the dwarves in Norse mythology
- Dvalin was also the name of one of the four stags of Yggdrasill.
- Dwalin is a dwarf in Tolkien's The Hobbit.
