= Tjeldbergodden =

Industrial complex in Norway

Coordinates: 63.4097°N 8.6578°E

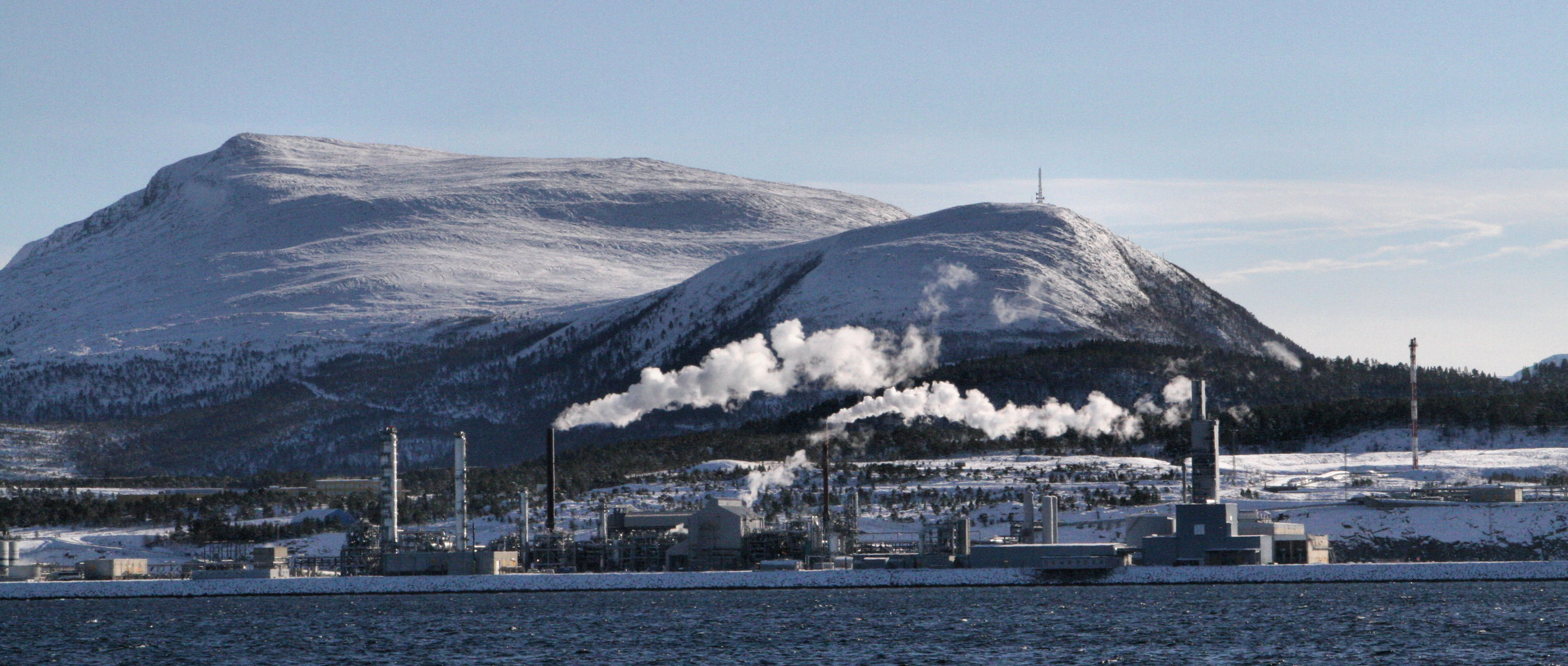
View of Tjeldbergodden

Tjeldbergodden is an industrial facility mainly featuring petroleum facilities located in the northeastern part of Aure Municipality in Møre og Romsdal county, Norway. It was constructed during the 1990s and among other things features the Statoil natural gas processing plant for the associated gas from the Heidrun oil field, transported to the facility by the Haltenpipe. Some of the natural gas is used at the co-located methanol plant.

There are plans for a 920 megawatts (1,230,000 hp) thermal power plant to be built at the site, fueled by natural gas. In addition, Statnett has installed the Tjeldbergodden Reserve Power Station, a natural gas-fired thermal power plant that can produce 150 megawatts (200,000 hp) of power.
