= Deer in mythology =

Deer

A gilded wooden figurine of a deer from the Pazyryk burials, 5th century BC

Deer have significant roles in the mythology of various peoples located all over the world, such as object of worship, the incarnation of deities, the object of heroic quests and deeds, or as magical disguise or enchantment/curse for princesses and princes in many folk and fairy tales.

The deer also symbolizes a connection to the supernatural, the Otherworld, or the fairy realm, e.g., being a messenger or an entity's familiar.

== In folk and fairy tales ==
A deer or a doe (female deer) usually appears in fairy tales as the form of a princess who has been enchanted by a malevolent fairy or witch, such as The White Doe (French fairy tale) and The Enchanted Deer (Scottish fairy tale), or a transformation curse a male character falls under. Sometimes, it represents a disguise a prince dons to escape or to achieve a goal, e.g., What the Rose did to the Cypress (Persian fairy tale). Tale types that include a transformation into deer or hind are ATU 401, "The Princess Transformed into Deer" and ATU 450, "Brother and Sister" (male relative changed into deer; see: Brother and Sister, German fairy tale; The Golden Stag, Romanian fairy tale).

A deer also appears as a helper, such as in Italian fairy tale The Dancing Water, the Singing Apple, and the Speaking Bird, as a foster mother to the exposed twin children; or in Portuguese folktale The Hind of the Golden Apple, as a talking animal who gifts the hero with the titular golden apple. It also may appear as a disguised adversary (an ogre, a sorcerer), e.g., in The Enchanted Doe (Italian literary fairy tale), or as a malevolent seductress, e.g., in Indian fairy tale The Son of Seven Queens, collected by Joseph Jacobs.

The deer also appears as a character in animal fables, e.g., The Deer without a Heart (Indian fable) and The Stag at the Pool (attributed to Aesop). Another cervine animal, the stag, appears in an etiological tale from Brazil (Why the Tiger and the Stag hate each other).

There's also a Chinese short film made by Ink Wash Animation in 1963 titled Deer Girl based on mythology about a white doe who gave birth to a girl after drinking divine water.

== Buddhism ==
In one of the Jataka tales, Buddha has reincarnated into the form of a deer. This story has many incarnations and names itself: such as "The Story of Ruru Deer", "The Golden Deer", and the Chinese cartoon A Deer of Nine Colors. The story originated in India around the 4th century BCE. The narrative hails the merits of compassion, empathy, and karma.

== Celtic ==
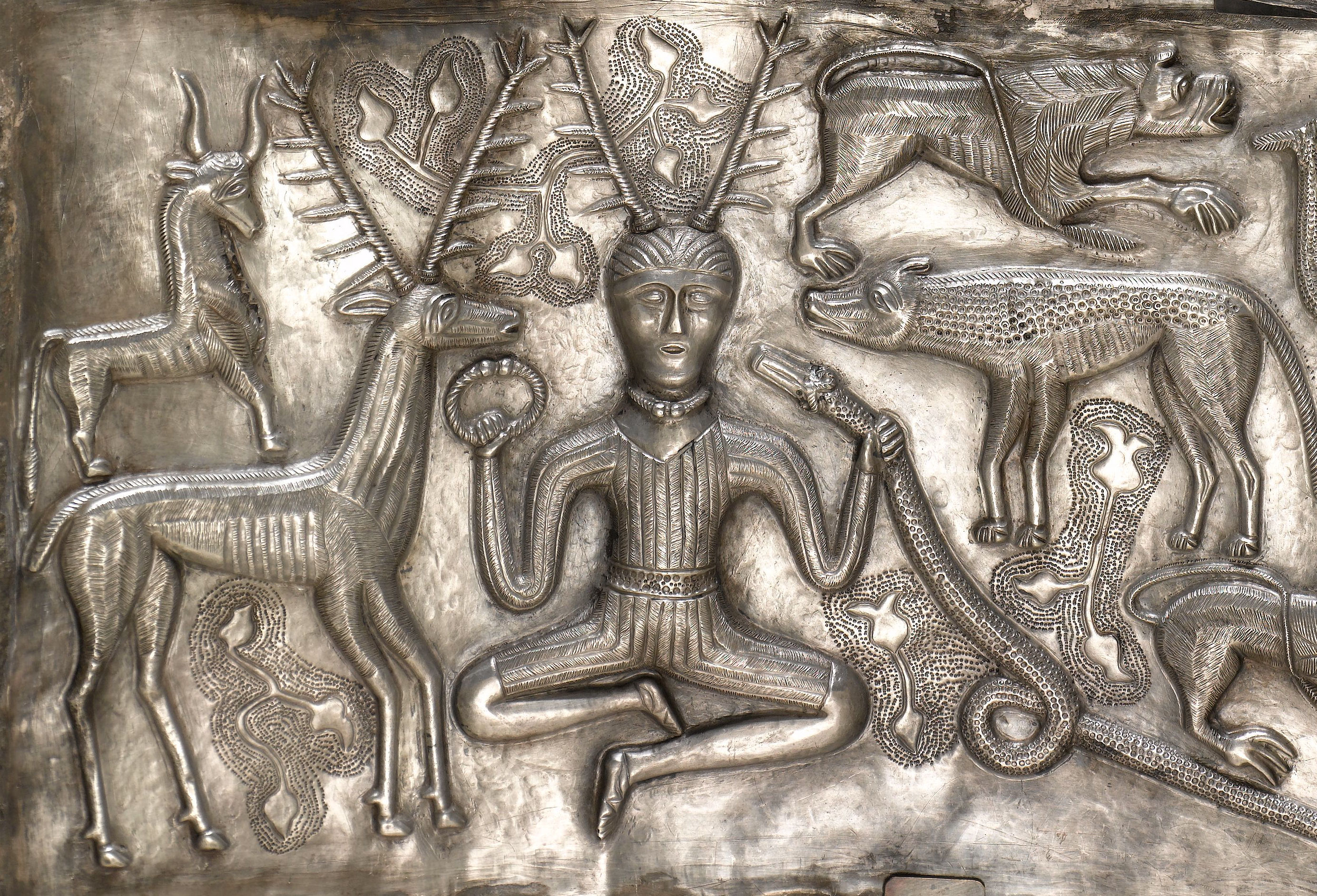
Antlered figure from the Gundestrup Cauldron, interior plate A

The Insular Celts have stories involving supernatural deer, deer who are associated with a spiritual figure, and spirits or deities who may take the form of deer.

In some Scottish and Irish tales, deer are seen as "fairy cattle", and are herded and milked by a tutelary, benevolent, otherworldly woman (such as a bean sìdhe or in other cases the goddess Flidais), who can shapeshift into the form of a red or white deer. In the West Highlands, this woman of the otherworld selects the individual deer who will be slain in the next day's hunt.

In Ireland, The Cailleach Bhéara ("The Old Woman of Beare"), who lives on an island off the coast of County Cork, takes the form of a deer to avoid capture, and herds her deer down by the shore. The Beare peninsula is also associated with the islands in the western sea that are the lands of the dead. Other Celtic mythological figures such as Oisín and Sadhbh also have connections to deer.

Cernunnos is a mythological figure in Continental Celtic mythology, and possibly one of the figures depicted on the Gundestrup cauldron. He has stag antlers on the top of his head. His role in the religion and mythology is unclear, as there are no particular stories about him.

== European folklore ==
Medieval works of fiction sometimes contain the existence of a white deer or stag as a supernatural or mystical being in the chivalry quest ("The Hunt for the White Stag" motif, such as in the lai of Guigemar) and in parts of Arthurian lore, such as in the medieval poem of Erec and Enide.

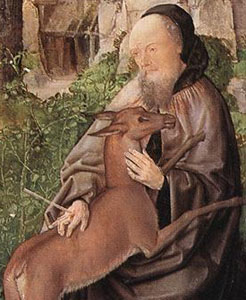
Detail of Saint Giles and the Hind, c. 1500, by the Master of Saint Gilles

Saint Giles, a Catholic saint especially revered in the south of France, is reported to have lived for many years as a hermit in the forest near Nîmes, where in the greatest solitude he spent many years, his sole companion being a deer, or hind, who in some stories sustained him on her milk. In art, he is often depicted together with that hind.

Deer figure in the founding legend of Le Puy-en-Velay, where a Christian church replaced a megalithic dolmen said to have healing powers. A local tradition had rededicated the curative virtue of the sacred site to Mary, who cured ailments by contact with the standing stone. When the founding bishop Vosy climbed the hill, he found that it was snow-covered in July; in the snowfall, the tracks of a deer around the dolmen outlined the foundations of the future church.

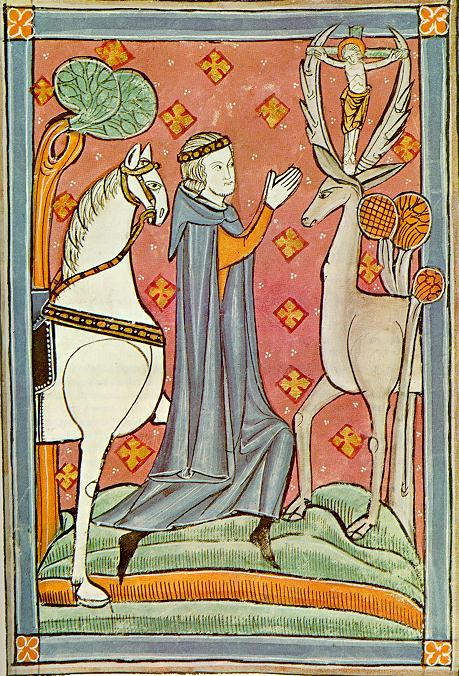
St Hubertus / St Eustace in a 13th-century English manuscript (Biblioteca Marciana)

Saint Hubertus (or "Hubert") is a Christian saint, the patron saint of hunters, mathematicians, opticians and metalworkers, and used to be invoked to cure rabies. The legend of St Hubertus concerned an apparition of a stag with the crucifix between its horns, effecting the worldly and aristocratic Hubert's conversion to a saintly life.

In the story of Saint Hubertus, on Good Friday morning, when the faithful were crowding the churches, Hubertus sallied forth to the chase. As he was pursuing a magnificent stag the animal turned and, as the pious legend narrates, he was astounded at perceiving a crucifix standing between its antlers, which occasioned the change of heart that led him to a saintly life. The story of the hart appears first in one of the later legendary hagiographies (Bibliotheca hagiographica Latina, nos. 3994–4002) and has been appropriated from the earlier legend of Saint Eustace (Placidus).

Later in the 6th century, the Bishop Saint Gregory of Tours wrote his chronicles about the Merovingian rulers. Historia Francorum contains the legend of King Clovis I, who prayed to Christ in one of his campaigns so he could find a place to cross the river Vienne. Considered as a divine sign, a huge deer appeared and showed where the army could pass.

In the 14th century, probably keeping some relation with Saint Eustace's legend, the deer again appears in Christian legend. The Chronicon Pictum contains a story where the later King Saint Ladislaus I of Hungary and his brother the King Géza I of Hungary were hunting in a forest, and a deer with numerous candles on his antlers appeared to them. Saint Ladislaus told his brother that it wasn't a deer but an angel of God, and his antlers were wings; the candles were shining feathers. He also stated his intent to build a cathedral in honor of the Holy Virgin in the place where the deer appeared.

== Germanic ==
An Anglo-Saxon royal scepter found at the Sutton Hoo burial site in England features a depiction of an upright, antlered stag. In the Old English language poem Beowulf, much of the first portion of the story focuses on events surrounding a great mead hall called Heorot, meaning "Hall of the Hart".

In the Poetic Edda poem Grímnismál the four stags of Yggdrasil are described as feeding on the world tree, Yggdrasil, and the poem further relates that the stag Eikþyrnir lives on top of Valhalla. In the Prose Edda book Gylfaginning, the god Freyr is reported as having once killed Beli with an antler. In Þiðrekssaga, Sigurd is presented as having been nursed by a doe.

Andy Orchard proposes a connection between the hart Eikþyrnir atop Valhalla, the hart imagery associated with Heorot, and the Sutton Hoo scepter. Sam Newton identifies both the Sutton Hoo whetstone and the hall Heorot as early English symbols of kingship. Rudolf Simek says that "it is not completely clear what role the stag played in Germanic religion" and theorizes that "the stag cult probably stood in some sort of connexion to Odin's endowment of the dignity of kings."

== Greek ==
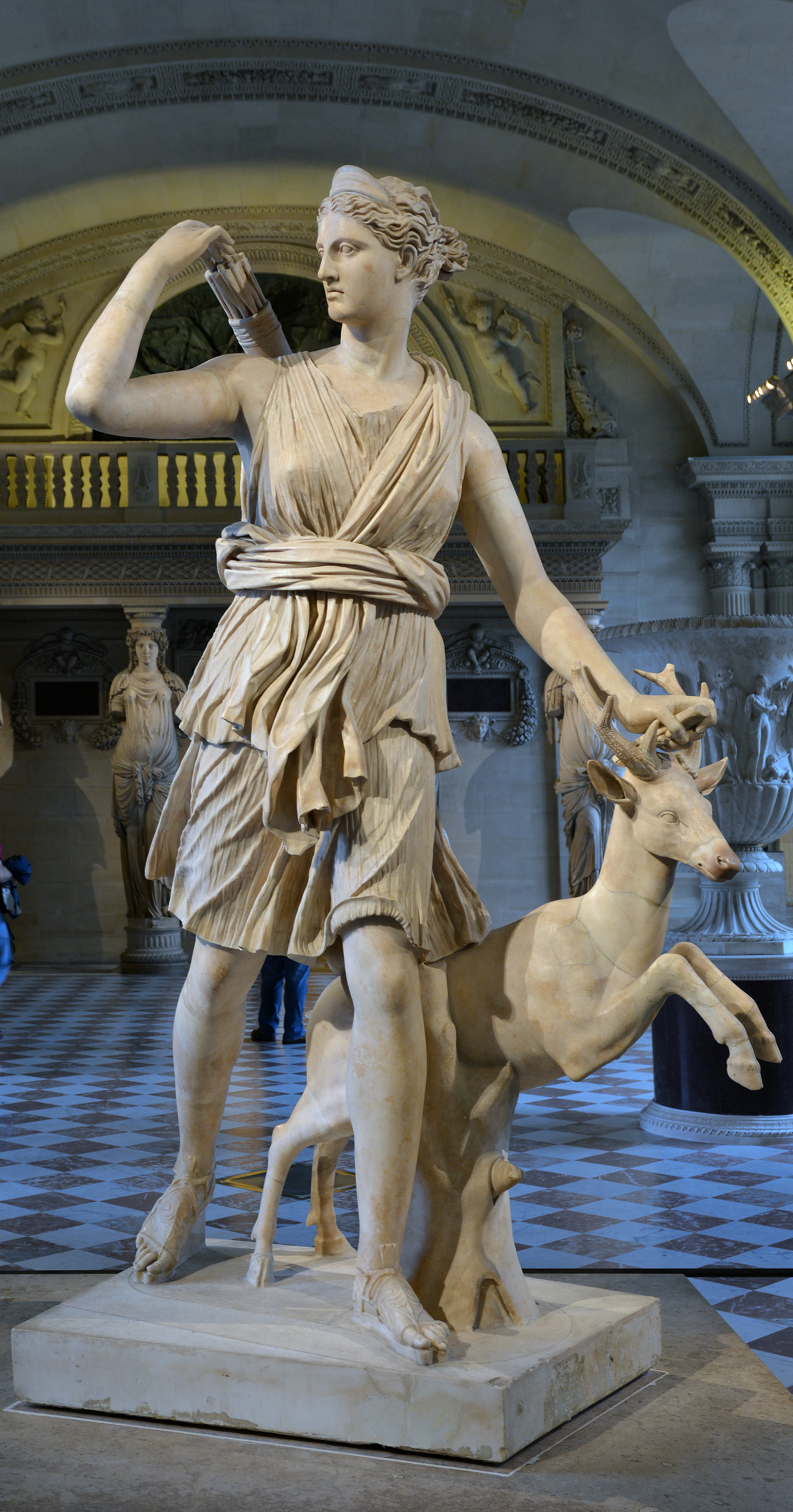
Diana of Versailles

In Greek mythology, the deer is particularly associated with Artemis in her role as virginal huntress. Callimachus, in his archly knowledgeable "Hymn III to Artemis", mentions the deer that drew the chariot of Artemis:

in golden armor and belt, you yoked a golden chariot, bridled deer in gold.

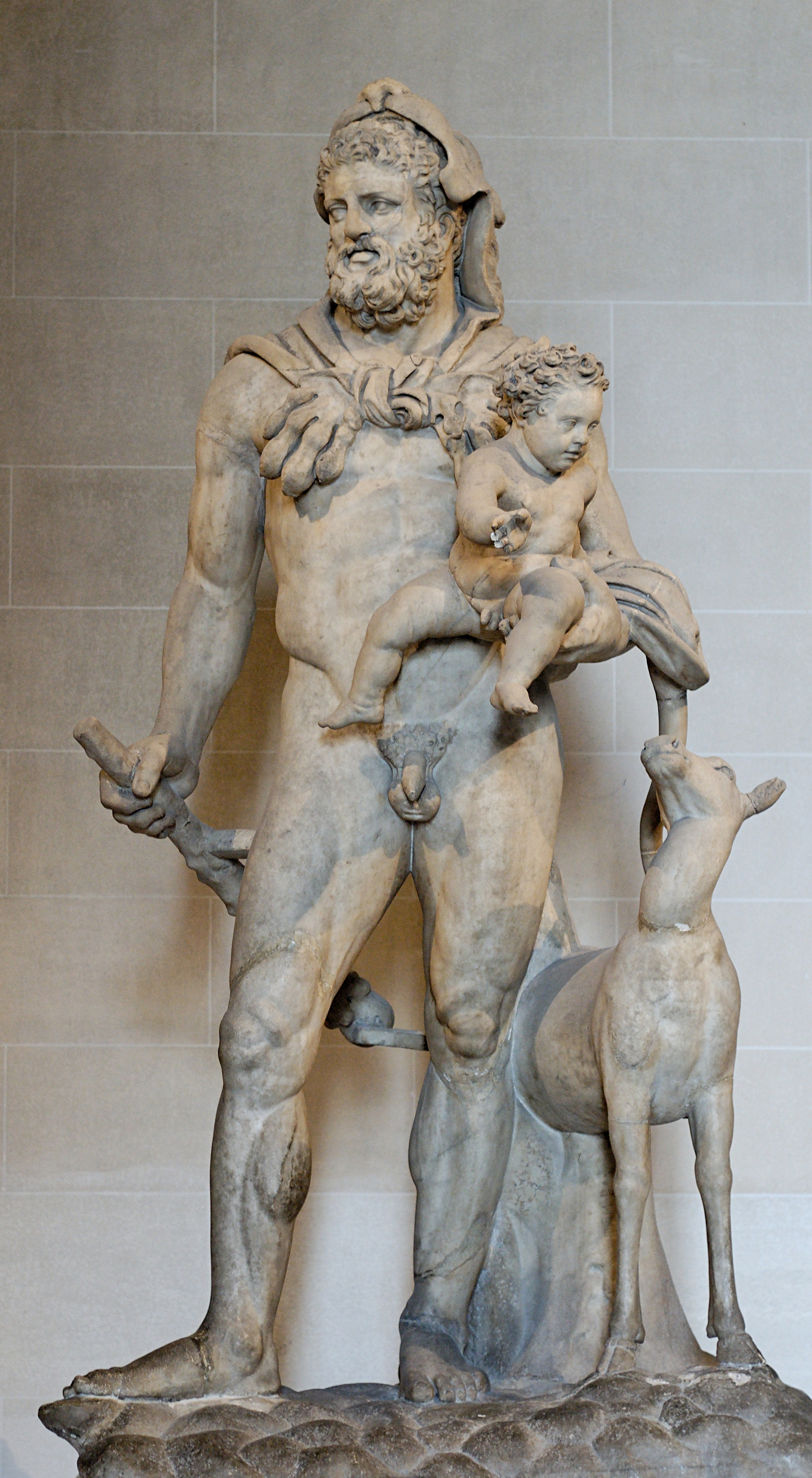
Heracles, Telephus and the doe (Louvre Museum)

One of the Labors of Heracles was to capture the Ceryneian Hind sacred to Artemis and deliver it briefly to his patron, then rededicate it to Artemis. As a hind bearing antlers was unknown in Greece, the story suggests a reindeer, which, unlike other deer, can be harnessed and whose females bear antlers. The myth relates to Hyperborea, a northern land that would be a natural habitat for reindeer. Heracles' son Telephus was exposed as an infant on the slopes of Tegea but nurtured by a doe.

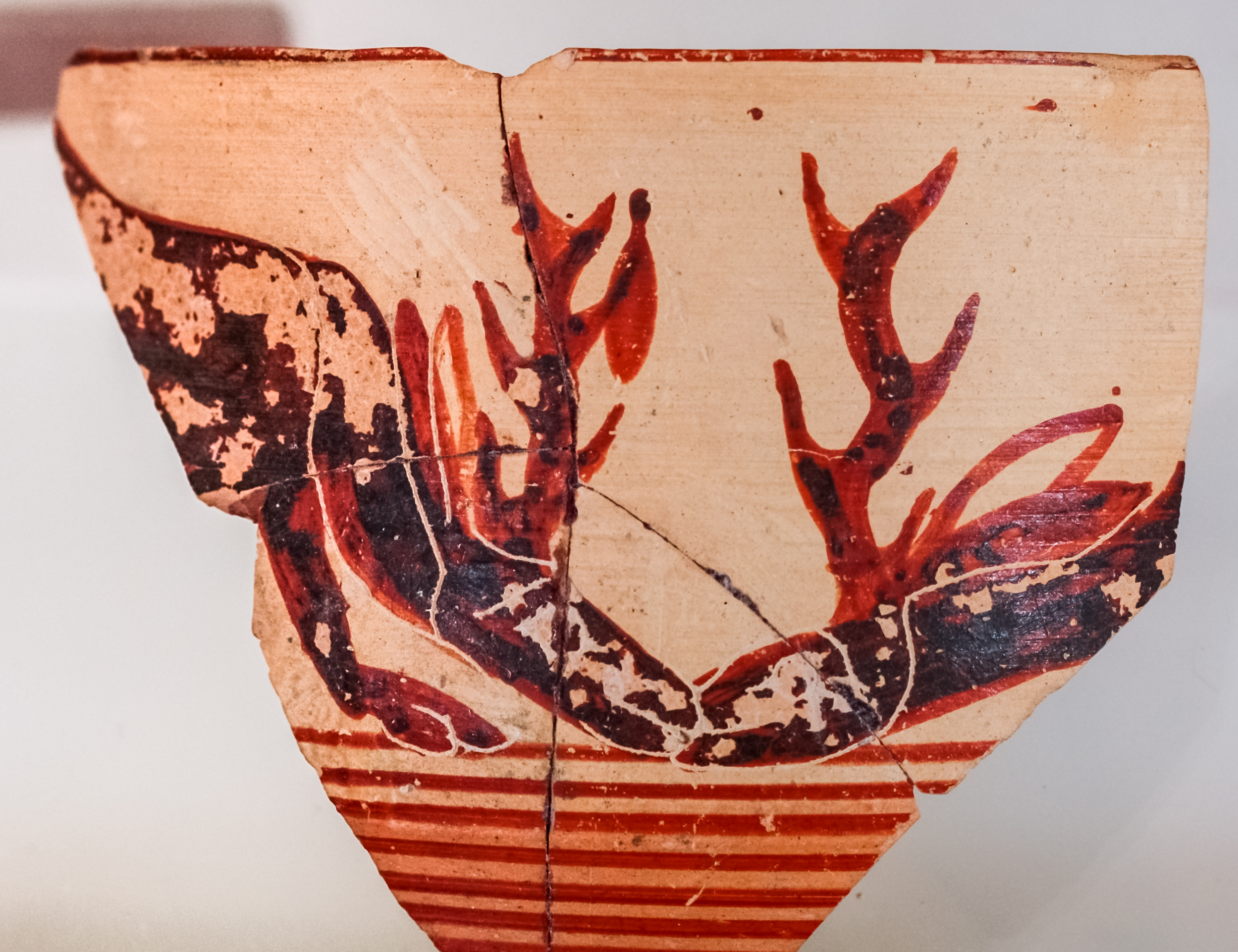
Stags fighting, c. 690–660 BC from Aegina

Several figures were transformed into deer in Greek myths. The most notable among them is the hunter Actaeon, who accidentally stumbled upon Artemis one day as she was bathing naked. Artemis turned him into a stag so that he could never tell what he had seen. Actaeon bolted off only to be chased by his own hunting dogs who did not recognise their master. The dogs caught him and devoured him. In some versions of the myth, Actaeon deliberatively tried to assault the goddess.

Others include Arge, a mortal huntress who claimed that even though the stag she was chasing was as fast as the Sun, she would catch it eventually. Helios the sun-god was offended by her words, so he turned her into a hind. Two more women were turned into hinds, both at the hands of Artemis; the first Taygete so that she could escape the amorous advances of Zeus, and the second Titanis, a girl in Artemis's own retinue, who incurred the goddess's wrath.

== Hinduism ==
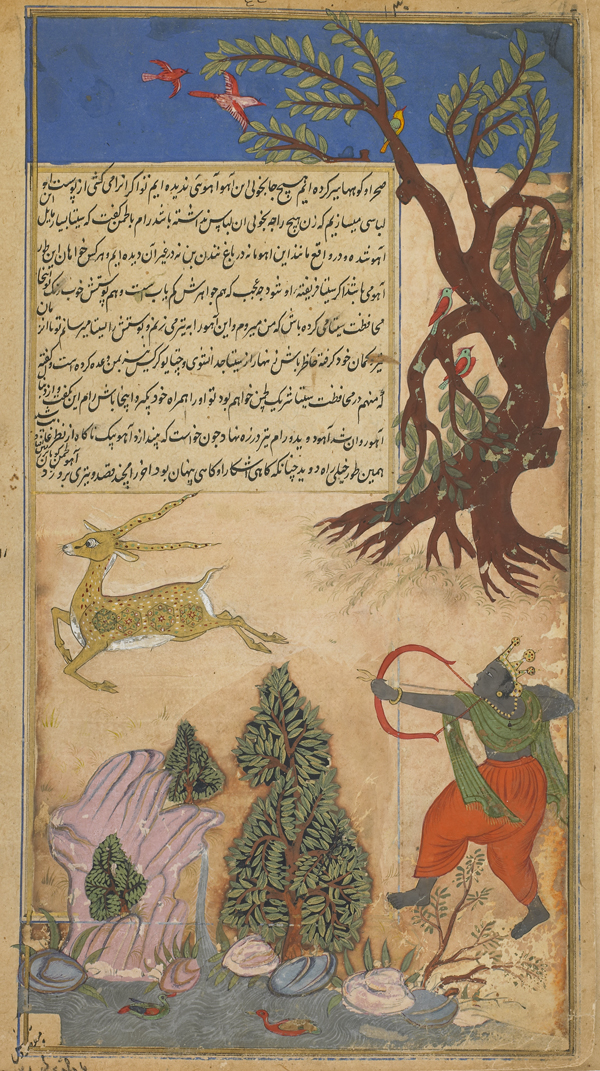
Rama kills the golden deer in Ramayana.

In Hindu mythology, the Aitareya Upanishad tells us that the goddess Saraswati takes the form of a red deer called Rohit. Saraswati is the goddess of learning, so learned men use deer skin as clothing and mats to sit upon. A golden deer plays an important role in the epic Ramayana. While in exile in the forest, Rama's wife Sita sees a golden deer and asks Rama and Lakshmana to get it for her. The deer is actually a rakshasa called Maricha in disguise. Maricha takes this form to lure Rama and Lakshmana away from Sita so his nephew Ravana can kidnap her.

In the Hindu epic mahabharata, the rishi Kindama dons the disguise of a male deer.

South-Indian icons of the Hindu god Shiva may be depicted holding a deer in a hand. In the iconography of Shiva's mendicant form Bhikshatana, a deer playfully leaps near a hand of the god, who holds some grass. The deer also appears in icons of another form Kankalamurti, who is depicted similar to Bhikshatana.

== Jainism ==
In Jainism, the figure Harineyameshi (considered to be the same figure in Hindu sources referred to as Naigamesha often portrayed with the head of a goat) who is associated with transferring the embryo of Mahavira, is sometimes depicted having the head of a deer.

== Hittite ==
The stag was revered alongside the bull at Alaca Höyük and continued in the Hittite mythology as the protective deity whose name is recorded as ^{d}KAL. Other Hittite gods were often depicted standing on the backs of stags, such as Kurunta or fellow Anatolian (Luwian) deity Runtiya. The deer would also have a long-standing rivalry with the mountains in Hittite mythology

== Huichol ==
For the Huichol people of Mexico, the "magical deer" represents both the power of maize to sustain the body and of the peyote cactus to feed and enlighten the spirit. Animals such as the eagle, jaguar, serpent and deer are of great importance to the Mexican indigenous cultures. For each group, however, one of these animals is of special significance and confers some of its qualities to the tribe.

For the Huichol it is the deer that holds this intimate role. The character of the Huichol tends to be light, flexible and humorous. They have avoided open warfare, neither fighting against the Spanish nor Mexican governments, but holding to their own traditions. The Huichol hunt and sacrifice deer in their ceremonies. They make offerings to the Deer of the Maize to care for their crops, and to the Deer of the Peyote to bring them spiritual guidance and artistic inspiration.

== Hungarian ==
In Hungarian mythology, Hunor and Magor, the founders of the Magyar peoples, chased a white stag in a hunt. The stag lead them into unknown land that they named Scythia. Hunor and Magor populated Scythia with their descendants the Huns and the Magyars. To this day, an important emblem in Hungary is a many-antlered stag with its head turned back over its shoulder.

== Turkic ==
Deer is associated with wisdom, agility, fertility and supernatural powers in Turkic mythology. In some of the early Turkic tombs, deer figurines were found.

In the Ottoman Empire, and more specifically in western Asia Minor and Thrace the deer cult seems to have been widespread and much alive, no doubt as a result of the meeting and mixing of Turkic with local traditions. A famous case is the 13th century holy man Geyiklü Baba (i.e. 'father deer'), who lived with his deer in the mountain forests of Bursa and gave hind's milk to a colleague. Material in the Ottoman sources is not scarce but it is rather dispersed and very brief, denying us a clear picture of the rites involved.

== Judaism ==
The Tribe of Naphtali bore a stag on its tribal banner and was poetically described as a hind in the Blessing of Jacob.

In Jewish mythology as discussed in the Babylonian Talmud in Hullin 59b:2, a one-horned stag called the qeresh (קרש).

== Christianity ==
In Christianity, deer are mentioned figuratively in multiple contexts and have several meanings.

Deers have been the subject of psalms (Psalm 18:33-35). Their hooves are considered important because of their ability to climb rocky mountains, hence their use as a metaphor for Christian interpreters.

== Occultism ==
The spirit or demon Furfur in the Ars Goetia is depicted as a hart or winged hart.

== Classical music ==
In 1914, Hungarian composer Béla Bartók collected two Hungarian (Székely) colinde in Transylvania. The story is of a father who has taught his nine sons only how to hunt, so they know nothing of work and spend all of their time in the forest. One day while hunting a large and beautiful stag, they cross a haunted bridge and are themselves transformed into stags. The distressed father takes his rifle and goes out in search of his missing sons. Finding a group of fine stags gathered around a spring, he drops to one knee and takes aim. The largest stag (eldest son) pleads with his father not to shoot. The father, recognizing his favorite son in the form of a stag, begs his children to come home. The stag then replies that they can never come home: their antlers cannot pass through doorways and they can no longer drink from cups, only cool mountain springs. Bartók prepared a Hungarian libretto, and in 1930 set the tale to music in his Cantata Profana. It was first performed in London in 1934, in an English translation.

== Scythian ==
The Scythians had some reverence for the stag, which is one of the most common motifs in Scythian art. Possibly the swift animal was believed to speed the spirits of the dead on their way, which perhaps explains the curious antlered headdresses found on horses buried at Pazyryk (illustration at the top of this article).

== Slavic and Uralic ==
In Slavic fairytales, Golden-horned deer is a large deer with golden antlers.

Golden or silver deer/elk was a popular folk character at the Urals in the 18th century. There were tales about the mythical creature called Silver Deer, also known as the elk Golden Horns and the goat Silver Hoof.

== Shinto ==
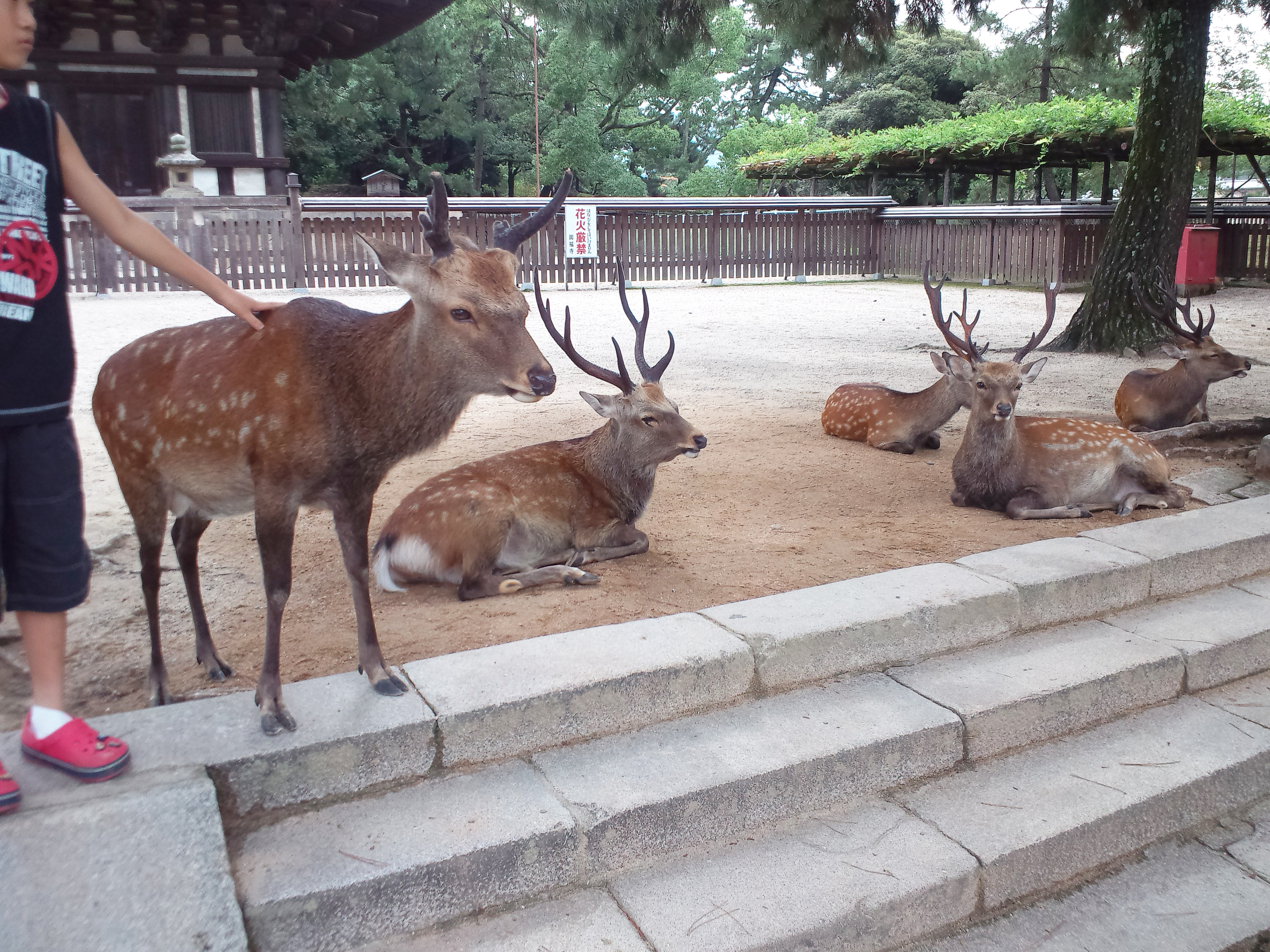
Sacred deer in Nara Park, a garden of the Kasuga shrine, Japan

Deer are considered messengers to the gods in Shinto, especially Kasuga Shrine in Nara Prefecture where a white deer had arrived from Kashima Shrine as its divine messenger. It has become a symbol of the city of Nara. Deer in Itsukushima Shrine, located in Miyajima, Hiroshima, are also sacred as divine messengers. In various parts of Northeast Japan, a deer dance called "Shishi-odori" has been traditionally performed as an annual Shinto ritual.

== Tupi-Guarani ==
In Brazil, there is the indigenous legend of Anhanga (Anhangá). Anhangá in tupi-guarani: anhã + anga = to run + soul (or genius). It's a white deer, believed to have red eyes, and the protector of all animals in the forest. Anhanga can change into a man or sometimes other animals.

== Manufactured mythology ==
Quintus Sertorius, while a general in Lusitania, had a tame white stag which he had raised nearly from birth. Playing on the superstitions of the local tribes, he told them that it had been given to him by the goddess Diana; by attributing all his intelligence reports to the animal, he convinced the locals that it had the gift of prophecy. (See Plutarch's life of Sertorius and Pliny the Elder's chapter on stags [N.H., VIII.50])

The naming of Sir Francis Drake's ship the "Golden Hind" is sometimes given a mythological origin. However, Drake actually renamed his flagship in mid-voyage in 1577 to flatter his patron Sir Christopher Hatton, whose armorial bearings included the crest "a hind Or." In heraldry, a "hind" is a doe.

Rudolph the Red-Nosed Reindeer, as well as the rest of Santa Claus's reindeer, originated as fictional but have become an integral part of Western festive legend.
