= Haltenpipe =

Location
- Country: Norway
- Start: Heidrun field
- Passes through: North Sea
- To: Tjeldbergodden

General information
- Type: natural gas
- Owner: Gassled
- Operator: Gassco
- Technical service provider: Statoil
- Construction started: 1994
- Commissioned: 1996

Technical information
- Maximum discharge: 2.2. billion cubic metres per year
- Diameter: 16 in (406 mm)

Haltenpipe is a gas transport system which consists of a 250 kilometres (160 mi) long pipeline from the Heidrun field to Tjeldbergodden. It started operation in December 1996, and is operated by Gassco. Transport capacity is 2.2. billion cubic metres per year.

== History ==
The Haltenpipe PAD (Norwegian: Plan for anlegg og drift) was approved by the Norwegian Parliament in February 1992. The construction of the pipeline started in 1994, and was finished in November 1996. The Haltenpipe Joint Venture was established in June 1995. The operatorship of Haltenpipe has been transferred from Statoil to Gassco. The licence will expire at end of 2020. The current licensees are Petoro, Statoil, ConocoPhillips and Eni.

== Gas delivery ==
Natural gas from the Heidrun field is delivered in part through the Åsgard Transport system to Kårstø, and in part through the Haltenpipe gasline to Tjeldbergodden. A methanol plant built by Statoil and ConocoPhilips is located near the gas terminal at Tjeldbergodden. The annual delivery of Heidrun gas to the methanol plant is approximately 700 million cubic metres. The methanol plant initiated production in June 1997. Gas is also delivered to a nearby gas fractionation and liquefaction plant, which has an annual capacity of 35 million cubic metres. The total recoverable gas reserves at the Heidrun field has been estimated to be 41.6 billion cubic metres, while the estimated remaining amount as of 31 December 2008 was 30.1 billion cubic metres.
