= Heiðrún =

Goat from Norse mythology

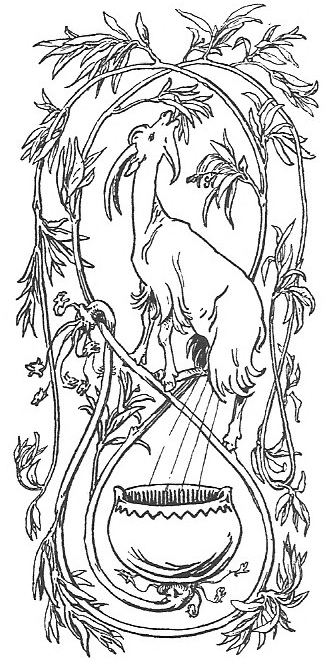
The goat Heiðrún consumes the foliage of the tree Læraðr, while her udders produce mead, collected in a pot below (1895) by Lorenz Frølich.

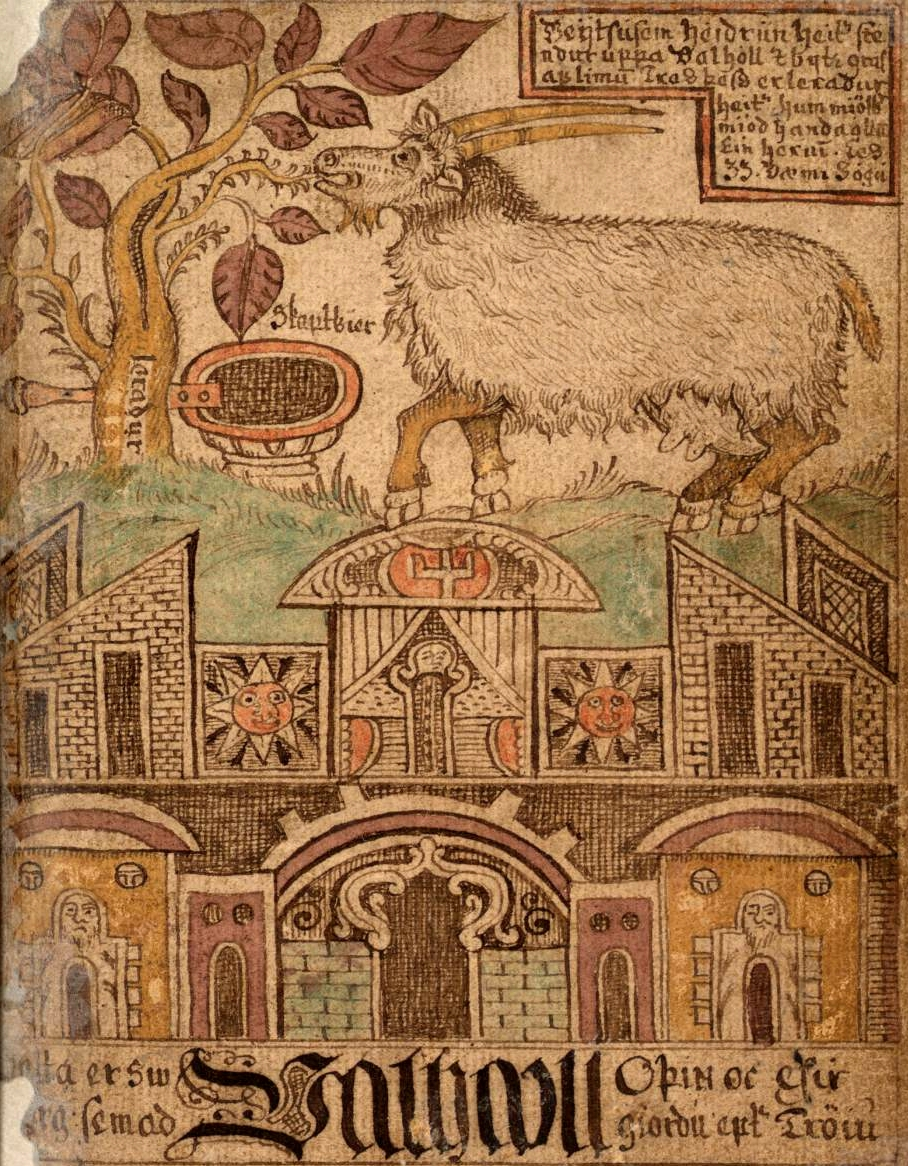
Heiðrún consumes the leaves of Læraðr Negga Valhalla in an illustration from an 18th-century Icelandic manuscript.

Heiðrún or Heidrun is a nanny goat in Norse mythology, that consumes the foliage of the tree Læraðr and produces mead from her udders for the einherjar. She is described in the Poetic Edda and Prose Edda.

== Etymology ==
The etymology of Heiðrún remains debatable. Anatoly Liberman suggests that Heiðþyrnir, the name of the lowest heaven in Scandinavian mythology (from heið "bright sky"), was cut into two, and on the basis of those halves the names the heavenly goat Heiðrún and of the heavenly stag Eikþyrnir were formed (the element rún ~ run concealed several puns, but it is a common suffix of female names). The etymology of the New High German name Heidrun is also debatable.

Heiðrún's name is sometimes anglicized Heidrun, Heidhrun, Heithrun, Heidrún, Heithrún or Heidhrún.

== Prose Edda ==
Geit sú er Heiðrún heitir stendr uppi á Valhöll ok bítr barr af limum trés þess er mjök er nafnfrægt, er Léraðr heitir, en ór spenum hennar rennr mjöðr sá er hon fyllir skapker hvern dag. Þat er svá mikit at allir einherjar verða fulldruknir af. -

A goat called Heiðrún stands up [on its hind-legs] in Valhalla biting the buds off the branches of that very famous tree which is called Lærað. From her teats runs the mead with which every day she fills a cauldron, which is so big that all the Einherjar can drink their fill from it. - Young's translation

== Poetic Edda ==
In the Poetic Edda Heiðrún is mentioned twice. She is described in the Grímnismál in a way similar to Snorri's description.

Heiðrún heitir geit, er stendr höllo á ok bítr af læraðs limom; skapker fylla hón skal ins skíra miaðar, knáat sú veig vanaz.	Heithrún, the goat on the hall that stands, eateth off Læráth's limbs; the crocks she fills with clearest mead, will that drink not e'er be drained. - LMH's translation

Since Snorri quotes other strophes of Grímnismál it seems reasonable to assume that he knew this strophe too and used it as his source for his description of Heiðrún.

In the Hyndluljóð the giantess Hyndla (lit. bitch/she-dog) used the term "Heiðrún" to insult the goddess Freyja. Thorpe and some other translators translated the name straight to "she-goat".

Rannt at Óði ey þreyjandi, skutusk þér fleiri und fyrirskyrtu; hleypr þú, Óðs vina úti á náttum, sem með höfrum Heiðrún fari.	To Oth didst thou run, who loved thee ever, And many under thy apron have crawled; My noble one, out in the night thou leapest, As Heithrun goes the goats among. - Bellows' translation

== In popular culture ==
- Heidrun is a song by Amon Amarth, a Swedish melodic death metal band, about the goat Heiðrún.
- Portland, Oregon-based metal band Agalloch mentions Heiðrún in the lyrics to their 2006 song "Not Unlike the Waves" from the album Ashes Against the Grain.
- Heiðrún is a character in Fire Emblem Heroes, first revealed in June 2024.

== See also ==
- Auðumbla, a primeval cow in Norse mythology whose udders produce four rivers of milk, from which Ymir fed
- List of people named Heidrun
- Amalthea (mythology), mother of Zeus sometimes depicted as a goat

== Bibliography ==
- Bellows, Henry Adams. Translation of the Poetic Edda.
- Eysteinn Björnsson (ed.) (2005). Snorra-Edda: Formáli & Gylfaginning : Textar fjögurra meginhandrita.
- Hollander, Lee M. (1962). The Poetic Edda. Austin: University of Texas. ISBN 0-292-76499-5.
- Jón Helgason (Ed.). (1955). Eddadigte (3 vols.). Copenhagen: Munksgaard.
- Liberman, Anatoly (2016). In Prayer and Laughter. Essays on Medieval Scandinavian and Germanic Mythology, Literature, and Culture. Paleograph Press. ISBN 9785895260272.
- Young, Jean I. (1964). Snorri Sturluson : the Prose Edda. Berkeley: University of California Press. ISBN 0-520-01231-3.
