= Tjeldbergodden Reserve Power Station =

Power station in Aure, Møre og Romsdal, Norway

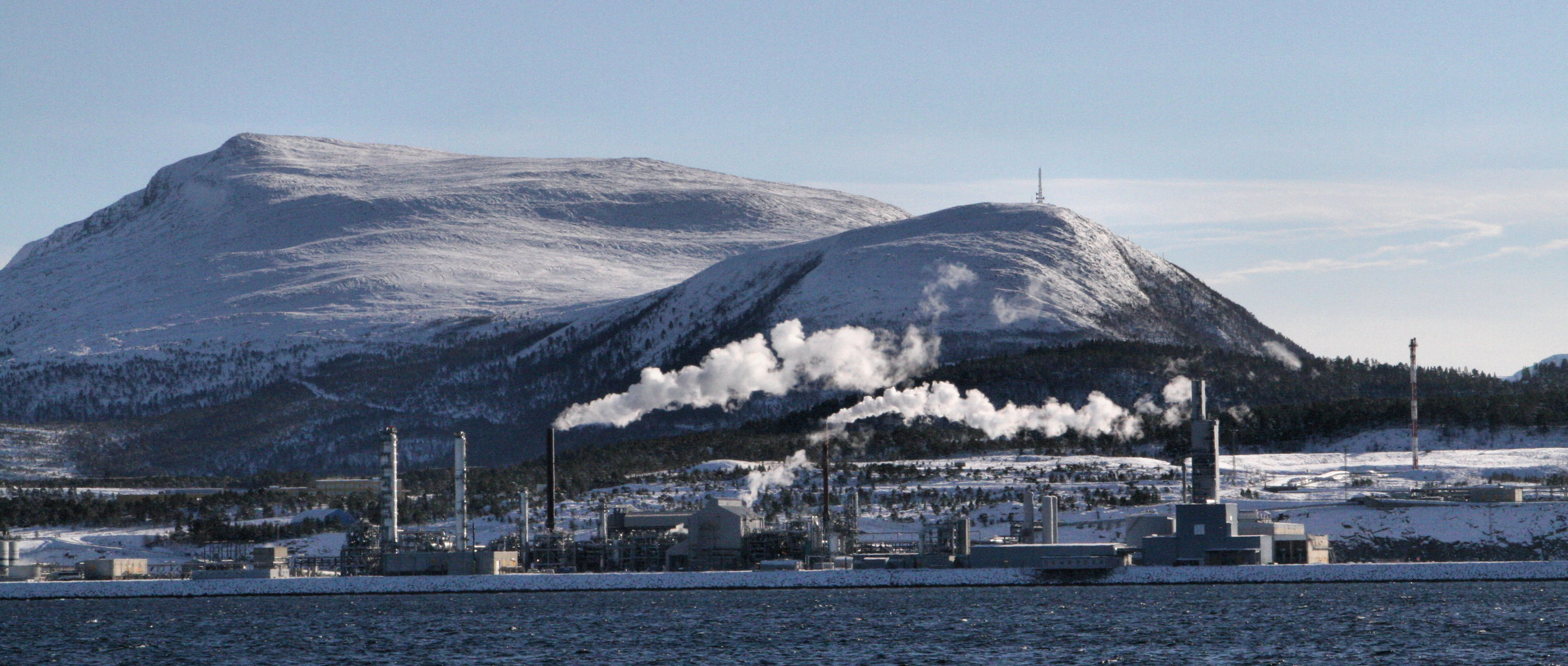
- Country: Norway
- Location: Tjeldbergodden
- Coordinates: 63.4097°N 8.6578°E
- Owner: Statnett
- Operator: Statnett

Thermal power station
- Primary fuel: Natural gas

Power generation
- Units operational: 1
- Nameplate capacity: 150 MW

Tjeldbergodden Reserve Power Station is a natural gas-fired thermal power plant located at the industrial site Tjeldbergodden in the northeastern part of Aure Municipality in Møre og Romsdal county, Norway. It is operated by Statnett. The station has installed one gas turbine with 150 megawatts (200,000 hp) effect. The power station was installed in 2006, but by 2015 it had not been in use. Together with the similar power plant at Nyhamna, they cost 2.1 billion kr. A new power line has made them unnecessary.

The power station is only to be operated when there is acute need for extra effect, to hinder having to ration electricity. Statnett must receive permission from the Norwegian Water Resources and Energy Directorate every time the station is to be used. Due to the mobility of the power station, its emissions of carbon dioxide exceed that of a coal powered station.
