= Silvia Miksch =

Austrian computer scientist

Silvia Miksch is an Austrian computer scientist working in information visualization, particularly for time-oriented and medical data. She is head of the Centre for Visual Analytics Science and Technology at TU Wien.

== Education and career ==
Miksch has a master's degree and Ph.D. from the University of Vienna, earned in 1987 and 1990 respectively.

After postdoctoral research at the Austrian Research Institute for Artificial Intelligence and at Stanford University, she became a faculty member at TU Wien in 1996. She became University Professor at Danube University Krems in 2006, before moving back to TU Wien again in 2010 as the founding director of the Centre for Visual Analytics Science and Technology.

She chaired the Austrian Society for Artificial Intelligence (ÖGAI) from 1997 to 2006.

== Books ==
Miksch is a coauthor of the books Visualization of Time-Oriented Data (with Wolfgang Aigner, Heidrun Schumann, and Christian Tominski, Springer, 2011) and Interactive Information Visualization to Explore and Query Electronic Health Records (Now Publishers, 2013). She is also the editor or co-editor of multiple edited volumes.

== Recognition ==
In 2020, Miksch was listed in the IEEE Visualization Academy by the IEEE Visualization and Graphics Technical Community.
