= Heidrun Gerzymisch =

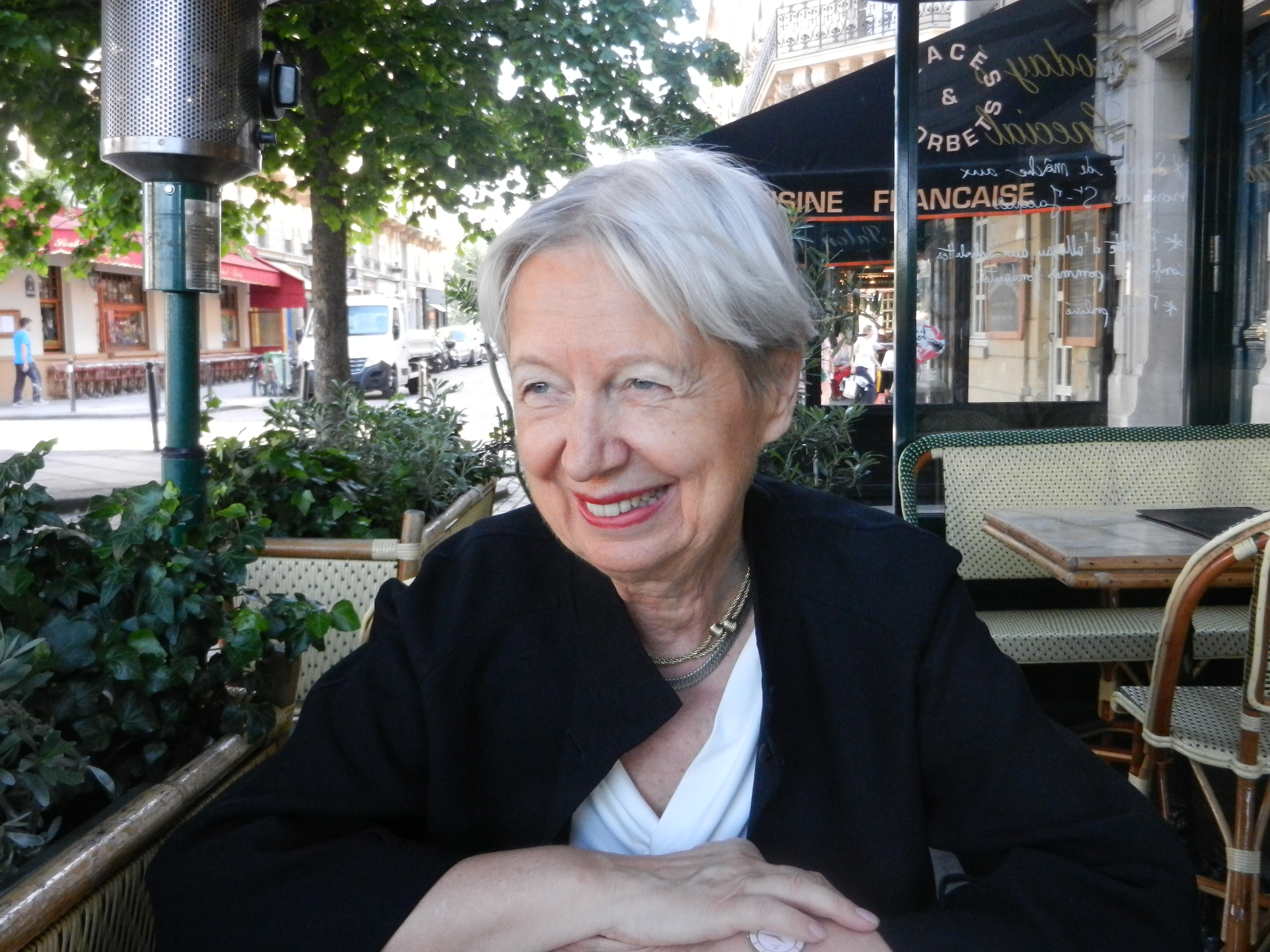
Heidrun Gerzymisch

Heidrun Gerzymisch (8 May 1944) is a German Translation scholar and emeritus professor at Saarland University in Saarbrücken, where she held the Chair for "English Linguistics and Translation Science" from 1993 to 2009. She is in 2014 responsible for the international PhD prep school "MuTra" at Saarland University’s Graduate Center GradUS and lectures Translation at the Zurich University of Applied Sciences (ZHAW).

== Early life and education ==
Gerzymisch was born in Gusow, near Seelow, Germany. She graduated from the "Institut für Übersetzen und Dolmetschen" (Institute for Translation and Interpreting) of the Heidelberg University in 1969 with the degree as "Diplom-Übersetzer" (M.A. Translation) for English and Spanish with a minor in Economics, following a student internship at RTP, New York (1964) and language studies at the Polytechnic of Central London (1965) and the University of Zaragoza, Spain (1968). She subsequently worked as (certified) free lance translator and interpreter largely in the field of international business & economics.

== Career ==
From 1979 to 1993 Gerzymisch was Lecturer at the "Institut für Übersetzen und Dolmetschen" (Institute for Translation and Interpretation) of the Heidelberg University where she taught Translation seminars and practical (economics) translation courses. In 1986 she received her PhD (Dr. phil.) from Johannes Gutenberg University of Mainz-Germersheim with a dissertation on the information structure (theme-rheme analysis) of American business texts (in German).

She held professorships in 1987-1988, 1990 and 1991 at the "Department of Translation and Interpretation" at Monterey Institute of International Studies, Monterey, California, and completed her post-doctoral "Habilitation" in Translation Science at the Heidelberg University in 1992. She held an interim professorship in the area of translation science at the "Institut für Übersetzen und Dolmetschen" at the Heidelberg University in 1993 and then received a tenured appointment to the Chair for English Linguistics and Translation Science of Saarland University which she held until 2009. She was a visiting professor at the Translatology Institute of the Charles University in Prague in 1999, the Institute for Theoretical and Applied Translatology at the University of Graz in 2002, the Institute of Translation and Interpreting at the Zurich University of Applied Sciences (ZHAW) from 2008 to 2018, as well as at the Centre for Translation Studies at the University of Vienna in 2010.

In 1994 Heidrun Gerzymisch founded the Advanced Translation Research Center (ATRC) at Saarland University, and also in 1996 with Saarland foundation "Stiftung zur Förderung des wissenschaftlichen Nachwuchses im Übersetzen und Dolmetschen" ("Foundation for the Promotion of Young Scholars in Translation and Interpreting"). The ATRC organized a series of EU-financed Marie Curie Euroconferences at the Universities in Aarhus, Copenhagen, Prague, Saarbrücken and Vienna between 1999 and 2007. This later led to the founding of the international PhD "prep school" MuTra. In 2010, MuTra became integrated into Saarland University’s Graduate Center GradUS.

Gerzymisch is the chairperson of the EST (European Society for Translation Studies) Young Scholar Prize Committee.

== Research ==
Gerzymisch studies the processes involved in translation. Her research is strongly influenced by the ideas and principles of Heidelberg physicist and linguist Klaus Mudersbach. She developed a translation methodology based on Mudersbach's atomistic-holistic-holatomistic principle, expanding it to include what she calls "transparent subjectivity", or individualism into the translation process. Her research topics include: the role of holistic structures in comparison and transfer procedures in translation processes; comparative analyses of common traits and differences in language, knowledge and cultural systems; and the role of writing processes in the translation of audiovisual and hybrid texts.

Gerzymisch has published a number of books and journal articles about decision-making in translation processes, as well as coherence, information structure repetition of ideas in translated work. She has written about the interpretation of culture during the translation process and about the comparison of knowledge systems and discourse preferences. She has lectured and written about the evaluation of translations and about translation of subtitling, audio description and written interpretation of visual works. A collection of articles, edited by Juliane House, Werner Koller and Klaus Schubert, were published in German as Neue Perspektiven in der Übersetzungs- und Dolmetschwissenschaft in 2004, in honor of her 60th birthday.

== Personal ==
Heidrun Gerzymisch has family ties in the USA and Canada and lives in Germany and Switzerland.

== Selected works ==
- 1987: Zur Thema-Rhema-Gliederung in amerikanischen Wirtschaftsfachtexten. Eine exemplarische Analyse. Tübingen: Narr (Dissertation, in German).
- 1989 (with Klaus Mudersbach): "Isotopy and Translation". In: Peter W. Krawutschke (Ed.): Translator and Interpreter Training. New York: SUNY (= American Translators Association Scholarly Monograph Series. Vol. III). 147-170. Revised: Gerzymisch-Arbogast (2004): "On the Translatability of Isotopies". In: Antin, F./Koller, W. (Eds.): Les limites du traduisible. In: FORUM. Paris: Presses de la Sorbonne Nouvelle KSCI. Vol. 2 No. 2. 177-197
- 1996: Termini im Kontext: Verfahren zur Erschließung und Übersetzung der textspezifischen Bedeutung von fachlichen Ausdrücken. Tübingen: Narr. (post-doctoral "Habilitationsschrift", in German). Summary in English: (1994): "Identifying term variants in context: The SYSTEXT approach". In: Snell-Hornby, M./Pöchhacker, F./Kaindl, K. (Eds.): Translation Studies: An Interdiscipline. Amsterdam - Philadelphia: Benjamins (= Benjamins Translation Library. Vol. 2). 279-290.
- 1998 (with Klaus Mudersbach): Methoden des wissenschaftlichen Übersetzens. Tübingen - Basel: Francke. (in German). Revised, simplified and updated in English 2008 as "Fundamentals of LSP Translation" in: Gerzymisch-Arbogast, Heidrun/Budin, Gerhard/Hofer, Gertrud (Eds.): LSP Translation Scenarios. MuTra Journal 02.
- 1999: "Kohärenz und Übersetzung: Wissenssysteme, ihre Repräsentation und Konkretisierung in Original und Übersetzung". In: Gerzymisch-Arbogast, Heidrun/Gile, Daniel/House, Juliane/Rothkegel, Annely (Eds.): Wege der Übersetzungs- und Dolmetschforschung. Tübingen: Narr. 77-106. Updated (2007): "Visualisierte Textrepräsentationen und Translation". In: Villiger, Claudia/Gerzymisch-Arbogast, Heidrun (Eds.): Kommunikation in Bewegung. Multimedialer und multilingualer Wissenstransfer in der Experten-Laien-Kommunikation. Frankfurt: Lang. 57-75.
- 2001: "Equivalence Parameters and Evaluation". In: Lee-Jahnke, Hannelore (Ed.): Évaluation: Paramètres, Méthodes, Aspects Pédagogiques. META Vol. 46, no.2. 227-242.
- 2003: "Norm and Translation Theory. Some Reflections on its Status, Methodology and Implications." In: Schubert, Klaus (Ed.): Übersetzen und Dolmetschen: Modelle, Methoden, Technologie (= DGÜD Jahrbuch Übersetzen und Dolmetschen Band 4/I). Tübingen: Narr. 47-68.
- 2005: "That rising corn...ce blé qui lève...die aufgehende Saat... Towards a Common Translation Profile". In: Götz, Katrin/Herbst, Thomas (Eds): Translation and translation theory: uni- or bilateral relationship?. ZAA Zeitschrift für Anglistik und Amerikanistik Würzburg: Königshausen & Neumann. 117-132.
- 2005 (with Martin Will): "Kulturtransfer oder Voice Over: Informationsstrukturen im gedolmetschten Diskurs". In: Braun, Sabine/Kohn, Kurt (Eds.): Sprache(n) in der Wissensgesellschaft. Proceedings der 34. Jahrestagung der Gesellschaft für Angewandte Linguistik. Frankfurt: Lang.
- 2007: "Am Anfang war die Leipziger Schule". In: Wotjak, Gert (Ed.): Quo vadis Translatologie? Ein halbes Jahrhundert universitäre Ausbildung von Dolmetschern und Übersetzern in Leipzig. Rückschau, Zwischenbilanz und Perspektiven aus der Außensicht. Berlin: Frank & Timme. 59-78.
- 2008: Challenges in Multidimensional Translation. Proceedings of the MuTra Conference series 2005 – 2007, ed. by Heidrun Gerzymisch-Arbogast et al.
- 2011: "Translatorisches Verstehen im Spannungsfeld von Handeln und Reflexion: Akteur- und Betrachterperspektive". In: Pöckl, Wolfgang/Ohnheiser, Ingeborg/Sandrini. Peter (Eds.): Translation. Sprachvariation. Mehrsprachigkeit. Festschrift für Lew Zybatow zum 60. Geburtstag. Frankfurt: Lang. 139-148.
