= Heidrun Schumann =

German computer scientist

Heidrun Schumann is a German computer scientist specializing in data visualization. She is a professor emerita in the Institute for Computer Science of the University of Rostock.

== Education ==
Schumann completed her doctorate at the University of Rostock in 1981. Her dissertation, Automatische Wegfindung von Rohrleitungen, was jointly supervised by Karl-Heinz Kutschke, Helmut Kiesewetter, Karl-Heinz Werler, and K. Willnow. In 1989, she received her post-doctoral degree (Habilitation).

== Books ==
Schumann is a coauthor of the books Rastergraphik - Hardwareentwicklungen (in German, with Hansgeorg Meissner, Akademie-Verlag, Berlin, 1991), Visualisierung - Grundlagen und allgemeine Methoden (in German, with Wolfgang Mueller, Springer, 2000), Visualization of Time-Oriented Data (with Wolfgang Aigner, Silvia Miksch, and Christian Tominski, Springer, 2011, 2nd edition 2023) and Interactive Visual Data Analysis (with Tominski, CRC Press, 2020).

== Recognition ==
In 2014, Schumann was elected as a Fellow of the Eurographics Association. In 2020, she was awarded with the Fraunhofer Medal. In the same year, she was also listed in the IEEE Visualization Academy by the IEEE Visualization and Graphics Technical Community.
