= Heidrun Huwyler =

Swiss painter

- Born: 18 June 1942; Freiburg Germany
- Known for: Painting, graphic arts
- Movement: Post-Impressionism New Figurative Painting

Heidrun Huwyler (born 1942) is a Swiss German Post-Impressionist painter.

== Biography ==
Works by Heidrun Huwyler show a broad spectrum of artistic talents. Her abstract images are simultaneously emotional and spontaneous by showing colors on in several layers. Her technique is mainly influenced by informalism or "art informel" with origin in Paris. She lived and worked in Switzerland, Germany and South Africa. African inspiration is suggested by the choice of her motifs.
