= Dáinn, Dvalinn, Duneyrr and Duraþrór =

Four stags in the Poetic Edda

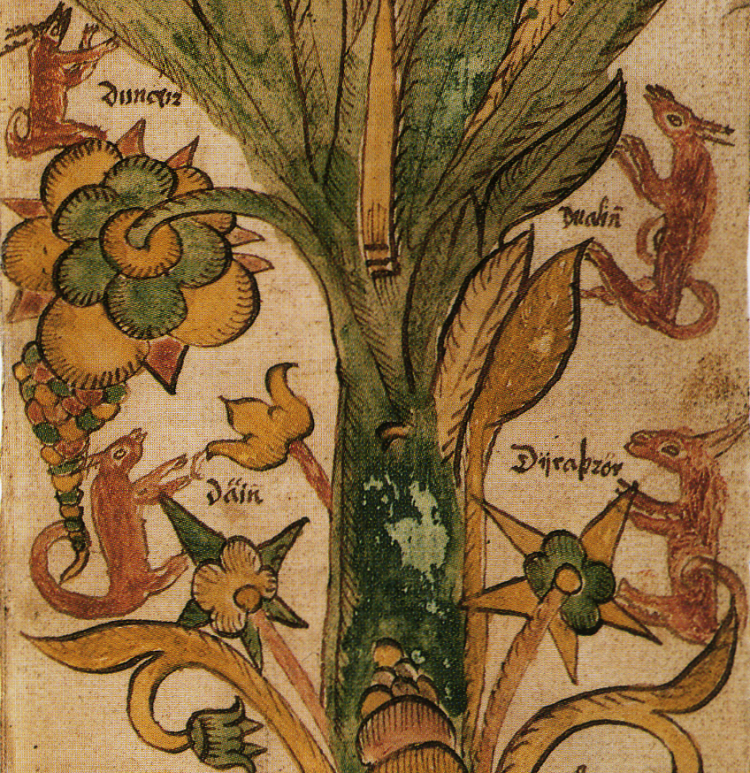
This drawing made by a 17th-century Icelander shows the four stags on the World Tree. Neither deer nor ash trees are native to Iceland.

In Norse mythology, four stags or harts (male red deer) eat among the branches of the world tree Yggdrasill. According to the Poetic Edda, the stags crane their necks upward to chomp at the branches. The morning dew gathers in their horns and forms the rivers of the world. Their names are given as Dáinn, Dvalinn, Duneyrr and Duraþrór. An amount of speculation exists regarding the deer and their potential symbolic value.

== Primary sources ==
The poem Grímnismál, a part of the Poetic Edda, is the only extant piece of Old Norse poetry to mention the stags.

1967 W. H. Auden & P. B. Taylor in The Elder Edda:

Grímnismál 33 Hirtir ero ok fiórir, þeirs af hæfingar á gaghálsir gnaga: Dáinn ok Dvalinn, Dúneyrr ok Duraþrór.	Thorpe's translation Harts there are also four, which from its summits, arch-necked, gnaw. Dâin and Dvalin, Duneyr and Durathrôr.	Hollander's translation Four harts also the highest shoots ay gnaw from beneath: Dáin and Dvalin, Duneyr and Dýrathrór.

The second line is enigmatic. The word á is hard to explain in context and is sometimes omitted from editions. The word hæfingar is of uncertain meaning. Finnur Jónsson conjecturally translated it as "shoots". English translators have translated it as "the highest shoots" (Hollander), "summits" (Thorpe), "the highest twigs" (Bellows), "the high boughs" (Taylor and Auden) and "the highest boughs" (Larrington).

This verse of Grímnismál is preserved in two medieval manuscripts, Codex Regius (R) and AM 748 I 4to (A). The text and translations above mostly follow R, the older manuscript. Where R has the word hæfingar, A has the equally enigmatic hæfingiar. Where R has gnaga ("gnaw"), A has ganga ("walk"), usually regarded as an error. A third difference is that R has "ágaghálsir" in one word where A clearly has "á gaghálsir" in two words. In this case the A reading is usually accepted.

In the Gylfaginning part of Snorri Sturluson's Prose Edda the stanza from Grímnismál is summarized.

Gylfaginning 16 En fjórir hirtir renna í limum asksins ok bíta barr, þeir heita svá: Dáinn, Dvalinn, Duneyrr, Duraþrór.	Brodeur's translation [A]nd four harts run in the limbs of the Ash and bite the leaves. They are called thus: Dáinn, Dvalinn, Duneyrr, Durathrór.	Byock's translation Four stags called Dain, Dvalin, Duneyr and Durathror move about in the branches of the ash, devouring the tree's foliage.

The word barr has been the cause of some confusion since it is most often applied to the needles of fir or pine trees. Richard Cleasby and Guðbrandur Vigfússon surmised that Snorri had used the word wrongly due to Icelandic unfamiliarity with trees. Others have drawn the conclusion that the World Tree was in fact a conifer. More recent opinion is that barr means foliage in general and that the conifer assumption is not warranted.

== Theories ==
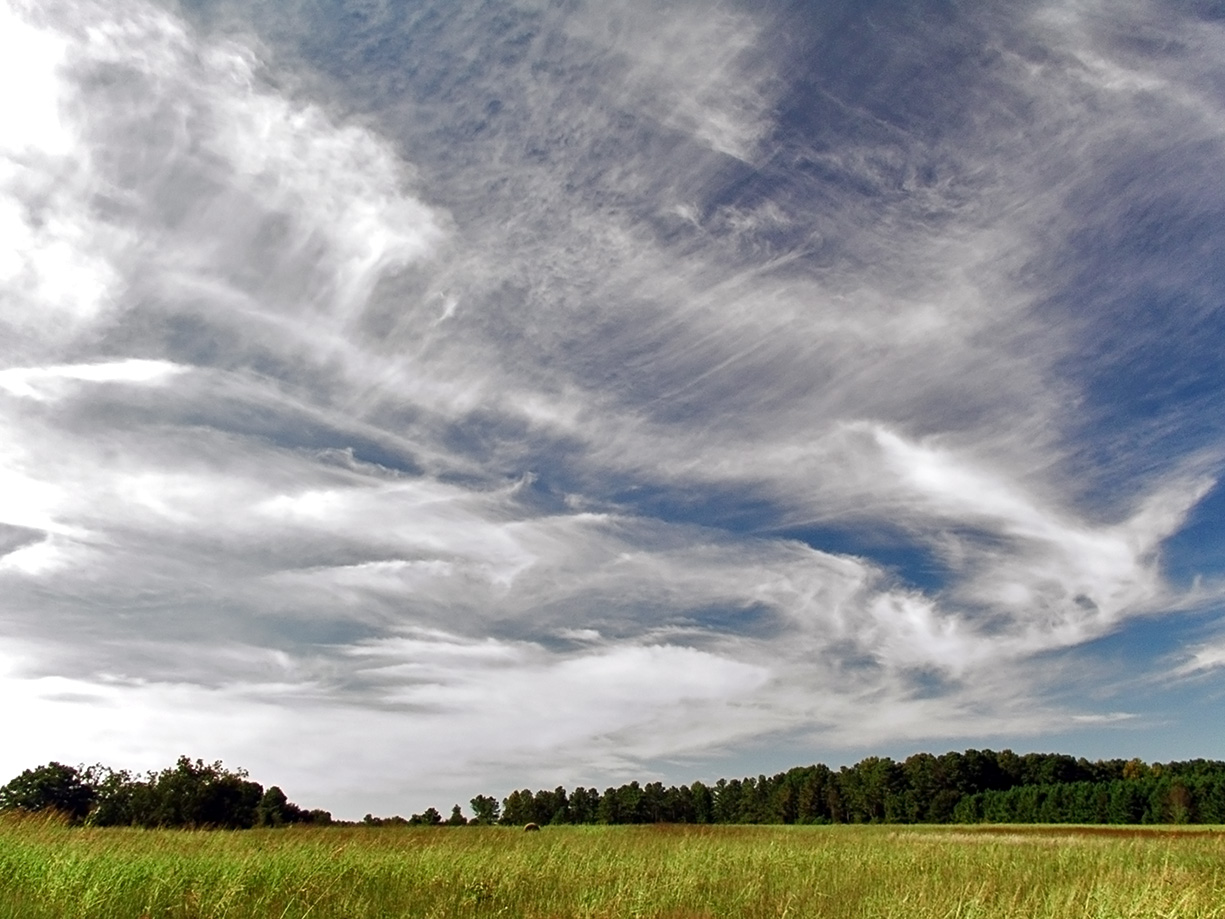
Sky as branches of Yggdrasill: compare how patterns of cirrus clouds may resemble branches of an ash tree

European ash tree

Early suggestions for interpretations of the stags included connecting them with the four elements, the four seasons, or the phases of the moon.

In his influential 1824 work, Finnur Magnússon suggested that the stags represented winds. Based on an interpretation of their names, he took Dáinn ("The Dead One") and Dvalinn ("The Unconscious One") to be calm winds, and Duneyrr ("Thundering in the Ear") and Duraþrór ("Thriving Slumber", perhaps referencing snoring) to be heavy winds. He interpreted the stags biting the leaves of the tree as winds tearing at clouds. He noted that dwarves control the winds (cf. Norðri, Suðri, Austri and Vestri, the dwarves of the cardinal points), and that two of the stag names, Dáinn and Dvalinn, are also dwarf names as well.

Many scholars, following Sophus Bugge, believe that stanzas 33 and 34 of Grímnismál are of a later origin than those surrounding them. Finnur Jónsson surmised that there was originally only one stag which had later been turned into four, probably one on each side. This is consistent with stanza 35 of Grímnismál, which mentions only one hart:

Grímnismál 35 Askr Yggdrasils drýgir erfiði meira enn menn viti: hiörtr bitr ofan, en á hliðo fúnar, skerðer Níðhöggr neðan.	Thorpe's translation Yggdrasil's ash hardship suffers greater than men know of; a hart bites it above, and in its side it rots, Nidhögg beneath tears it.

It has been suggested that this original stag is identical with Eikþyrnir, mentioned earlier in Grímnismál.

== See also ==
- Anemoi
- Deer in mythology
- Four Heavenly Kings
- Four sons of Horus
- Guardians of the directions
- Lokapala
- Four Dwarves (Norse mythology)
- Titan (mythology)
