= Anatoly Liberman =

American linguist and etymologist (born 1937)

Anatoly Liberman (Russian: Анато́лий Си́монович Либерма́н; born 10 March 1937) is a linguist, medievalist, etymologist, poet, translator of poetry (mainly from and into Russian), and literary critic.

Liberman is Professor of Germanic Philology in the Department of German, Nordic, Slavic and Dutch at the University of Minnesota, where since 1975 he has taught courses on the history of all the Germanic languages and literatures, folklore, mythology, lexicography, European structuralism and Russian formalism. He has published works on Germanic historical phonetics, English etymology, mythology/folklore, the history of philology, and poetic translation. He publishes a blog, "The Oxford Etymologist."

He is an advocate of spelling reform.

== Early life ==
Liberman was born in St. Petersburg (then Leningrad) on 10 March 1937. His father was killed in action in WWII in 1941. He graduated from Leningrad State Herzen Pedagogical Institute (now the Herzen State Pedagogical University) in 1959, and then taught English for three years at a boarding school for underprivileged children in the Leningrad region.

During that time Liberman studied on his own and passed what is known in Russia as the candidate minimum (Germanic philology, the history of English, German and philosophy, that is, Marxism and the history of the Communist Party of the USSR).

After returning to Leningrad in 1962, Liberman taught English at the Leningrad Polytechnic Institute (now Peter the Great St. Petersburg Polytechnic University) and became an extramural graduate student at Leningrad University.

Liberman's academic adviser was Professor M. I. Steblin-Kamenskij, at that time a Soviet scholar in Old Icelandic literature and Germanic historical phonology. In 1965 Liberman defended his Candidate of Philological Sciences (= PhD) dissertation on a topic of Middle English historical phonology, and in the same year Nikita Khrushchev ordered all the institutes of the Academy of Sciences to open groups for the study of what he called "the Scandinavian experience." Steblin-Kamenskij was invited to head such a group at the Institute of Linguistics and invited Liberman to be his full-time junior assistant. There he stayed until his emigration in 1975. In 1972 he defended his Doctor of Philological Sciences dissertation (= West European habilitation) titled "Icelandic Prosody." At the University of Minnesota since 1975, he spent one year as a Hill Visiting Professor and two years as an associate professor; after that he was promoted to full professorship.

== Phonological theories ==
Liberman's main ideas in phonology are as follows: 1) A non-contradictory theory of phonology is probably unattainable, because we lack the means of segmenting the speech current into phonemes. 2) The most adequate model of a phonetic change continuing for centuries, such as apocope and consonant shifts, is that of a change caused by some event and is over once the potential of the initial impulse has been used up. The cause of every major change is another change. 3) Stress is not a force but a privileged position in a word, a position in which some oppositions occur that are not allowed in any other syllable. 4) The greatest phonetic changes in the history of Germanic were the concentration of all distinctive features in the root syllable and consonantal lenition as its consequence. 5) Allophones, that is, the phonetic variants of a phoneme, cannot be phonologized (by definition). 6) In Germanic, systemic changes of short vowels are reactions to changes in long vowels. Likewise, changes of voiced consonants are triggered by changes in voiceless consonants; what appears as voicing is really weakening.

== Works on etymology ==
Liberman seeks to build an exhaustive purview of previous conjectures and hypotheses on word origins. His team has collected tens of thousands of articles on etymology from hundreds of journals, book chapters, and Festschriften, which feed his works. His books in this area include Etymology for Everyone: Word Origins and How We Know Them (2005), An analytic dictionary of English etymology: an introduction (2008), A Bibliography of English Etymology (2009), and Origin Uncertain: Unraveling the Mysteries of Etymology, Oxford University Press (2024). He has also published articles on individual words and groups of related words.

== Poetical works ==
His poetical works include translations and extended commentary on Mikhail Lermontov, Fyodor Tyutchev, Evgeny Boratynsky, and Shakespeare.

- Mikhail Lermontov. Major Poetical Works. Minneapolis: University of Minnesota Press, 1982
- On the Heights of Creation: The Lyrics of Fedor Tyutchev. Oxford: JAI Press, 1993.
- Vrachevanie dukha / [The Healing of the Spirit: Original Poetry and Select Translations from English and Icelandic into Russian. NY: Effect, 1993. [Includes Oscar Wilde's "The Ballad of Reading Gaol".]
- Vil'iam Shekspir, Sonety / William Shakespeare, Sonnets. Moscow: Iazyki slavianskikh kul'tur [The Languages of Slavic Cultures], 2016.
- Evgeny Boratynsky and the Russian Golden Age: Unstudied Words That Wove and Wavered. Anthem Press, 2020.

Original poetry has appeared in the journals Vstrechi [Encounters], Poberezh'e [The Coast], Novyi Zhurnal [The New Journal], and Mosty [Bridges].

== Literary criticism ==
- Saryn’ na kichku! [All-Hands-on-Deck!], Essays, poetry, and literary criticism, Magadan: Okhotnik (2022).
- Spinoi k syromu skvozniaku. Literaturnaia kritika [Leaving the Shelter of the Wall. Literary Criticism], Moscow: Iazyki slavianskoi kul’tury (2023).

== Works on the history of philology ==
- Vladimir Propp, Theory and History of Folklore (University of Minnesota Press, 1984);
- Stefán Einarsson, Studies in Germanic Philology (Helmut Buske, 1986),
- Three volumes of N. S. Trubetzkoy's works: Writings on Literature (University of Minnesota Press, 1990), The Legacy of Genghis Khan... (Michigan Slavic Materials 33, 1991), and Studies in General Linguistics and Language Structure (Duke UP, 1993) – editor, commentator, and partial translator into English.
- Epilogue, M. I. Steblin-Kamenskij's Myth (Karoma, 1982: 103–50).

== Medieval literature and mythology ==
- The Saga Mind and the Beginnings of Icelandic Prose, New York: The Edwin Mellen Press (2018).
- In Prayer and Laughter: Essays on Medieval and Germanic Mythology, Literature, and Culture, Moscow: Paleograph Press (2016).

== Selected linguistic bibliography ==
- Inroads into Germanic Historical Phonology: Prosody and Phonematics. Cambridge Publishers, 2026.
- The Saga Mind and the Beginnings of Icelandic Prose. Edwin Mellen Press, 2018.
- In Prayer and Laughter: Essays on Medieval Scandinavian and Germanic Mythology, Literature, and Culture. Moscow: Paleograph Press, 2016.
- "The Shortest History of Vowel Lengthening in English." Studies in the History of the English Language 6, 2015: 161–82).
- "Verner's Law" NOWELE 58/59, 2010: 381–425.

.*A Bibliography of English Etymology. Minneapolis: University of Minnesota Press, 2009.

- An Analytic Dictionary of English Etymology: An Introduction. Minneapolis, University of Minnesota Press, 2008, ISBN 978-0-8166-5272-3.
- Etymology for Everyone: Word Origins and How We Know Them. Oxford: University Press, 2005.
- "Apocope in Germanic, or an Ax(e) to Grind" New Insights in Germanic Linguistics II, 2001: 81–93)
- "Pseudolaryngeals (Glottal Stops) and the Twilight of Distinctive Voice in Germanic." Proceedings of the Eleventh Annual UCLA Indo-European Conference, 2000: 31–53).
- "Toward a Theory of West Germanic Breakings." IJGLSA 3, 1998: 63–119.
- "Palatalized and Velarized Consonants in English Against Their Germanic Background, with Special References to i-umlaut." Studies in the History of the English Language III, 2007: 5–36.
- "Vowel Lengthening before Resonant + Another Consonant and Svarabhakti in Germanic." On Germanic Linguistics. Issues and Methods 1991: 163–215.
- "The Phonetic Organization of Early Germanic." American Journal of Germanic Languages and Literatures [= IJGLSA] 2, 1990: 1–22.
- Germanic Accentology. Volume 1: The Scandinavian Languages. Minneapolis: University of Minnesota Press, 1982.

== Fiction ==
- Otets i syn, ili mir bez granits [Father and Son, or World without Borders]. St. Petersburg: Gumanitarnaia akademiia, 2021.

== Honors and awards ==
At the University of Minnesota (a selection): Scholar of the College (1985–88), McKnight fellowship (1994–96), Bush fellowship (1995), Fesler-Lampert Professorship (1999–2002), inclusion in The Wall of Discovery (2006), and an award for distinguished contribution to graduate and professional education (2010). From outside sources (a selection): a fellowship from the American-Scandinavian Foundation (1982), Guggenheim Fellowship (1982), Fulbright research fellowship (1988), NEH Summer Seminars (1980 and 1991), Fellowship at Clare Hall (Cambridge University, 1984), NEH Summer Scholarship (1995), summer scholarship (for research and lectures) from the University of Rome (1995), a fellowship from the American Council of Learned Societies (2001–2002); a certificate and a prize for a meritorious paper at the International Phonetic Congress 1977, Miami Beach (Florida, 1977), The Katharine Briggs Folklore Award by the Folklore Society (1995), the Verbatim Dictionary Society of North America award for best project of the year (1996), MLA's annual prize for "a distinguished bibliography" (2010). Word Origins… was a selection of the Book of the Month Club and three other clubs. In 2014 Liberman was elected President of the English Spelling Society, and in 2015 Fellow of the Dictionary Society of North America. In 1997 a Festschrift was published under the title Germanic Studies in Honor of Anatoly Liberman, NOWELE 31–32.
