= Heidrun oil field =

Oil and gas field in the Norwegian Sea

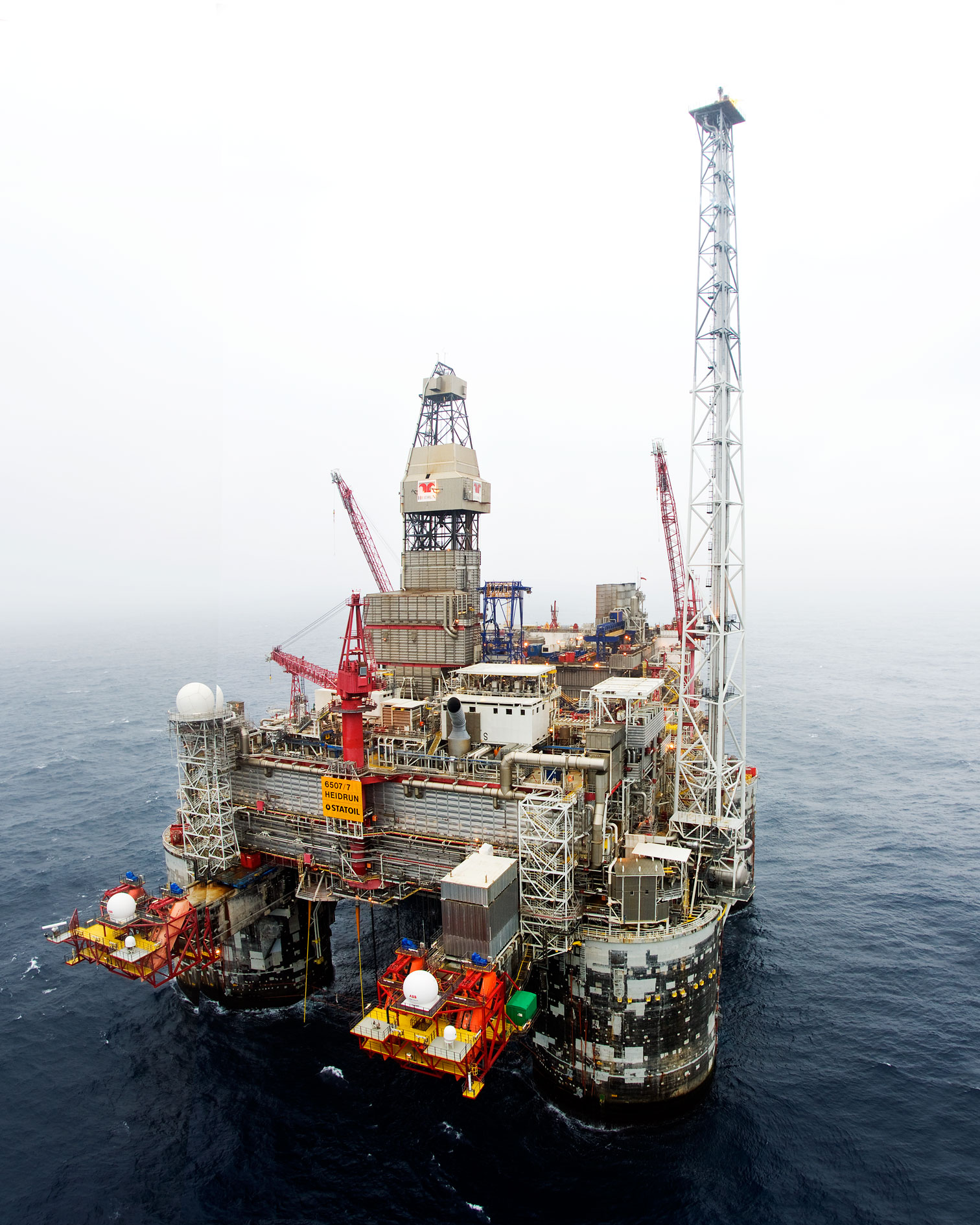

- Location within Norway
- Country: Norway
- Region: Norwegian Sea
- Location: Haltenbanken
- Blocks: 6507/8, 6707/7
- Offshore/onshore: offshore
- Coordinates: 65°19′33″N 7°19′3″E
- Operator: Equinor

Field history
- Discovery: 1985

Production
- Current production of oil: 140,000 barrels per day (~7.0×10^{6} t/a)
- Current production of gas: 3×10^{6} m^{3}/d (110×10^{6} cu ft/d)
- Recoverable gas: 42.6×10^{9} m^{3} (1.50×10^{12} cu ft)
- Producing formations: Garn, Ile, Tilje and Åre Formations of Early and Middle Jurassic age

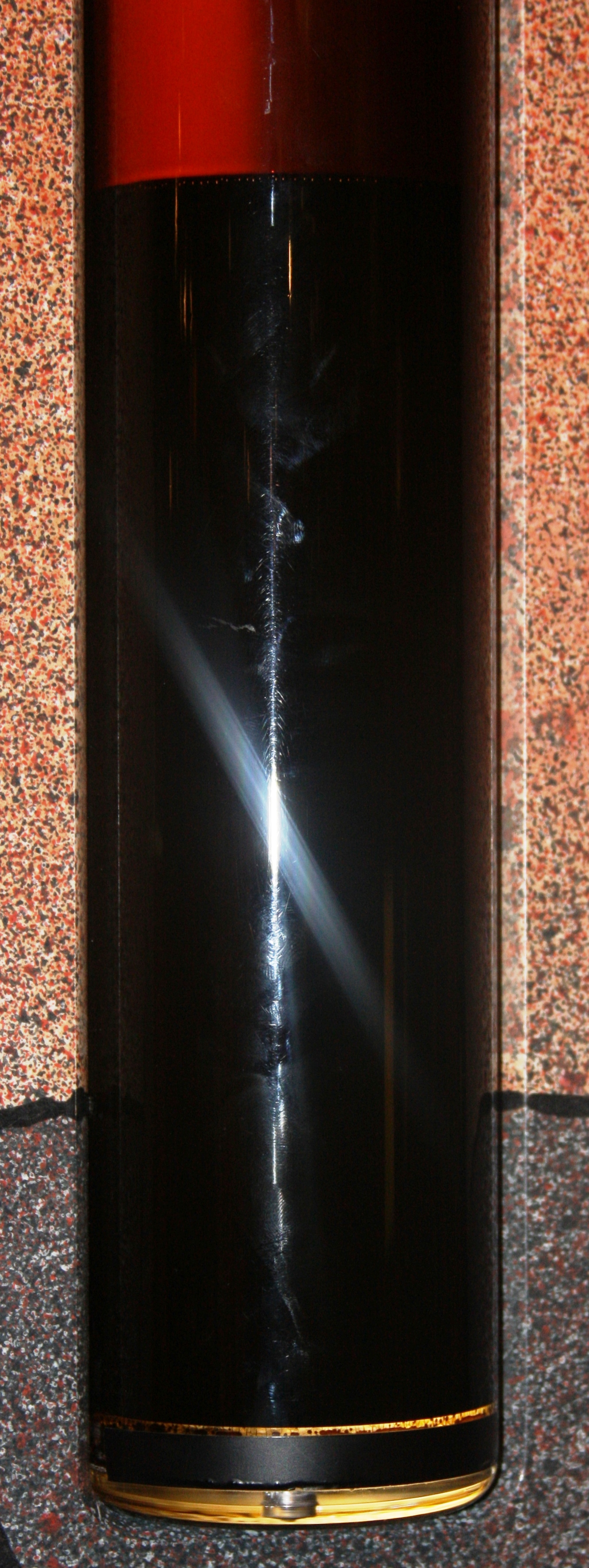
Oil from the Heidrun field.

The Heidrun oil field is an oil and gas field discovered in 1985 in the Norwegian sector of the Norwegian Sea, named after the goat Heiðrún from Norse mythology.

The field lies 175 kilometres (109 mi) north of Kristiansund. It has produced oil and gas since October 1995. In 2013, it produced 65,000 barrel of oil per day and 760 million cubic meters of natural gas. The crude oil is characterized as being naphthenic with 25.0 API (0.9043 g/cm^{3}), 0.52% sulfur, and a high TAN (Total Acid Number) of 2.90.

The Heidrun field is located on Haltenbanken in the Norwegian Sea at a depth of 350 metres (1,150 ft). The field has been developed with gas and water injection, using a floating concrete tension leg platform, installed over a subsea template with 58 well slots. The northern part of the field is developed with subsea facilities.

== Geology ==
The Cimmerian structure is a southwest-plunging horst block on the southwest flank of the Nordland ridge formed in the Late Jurassic-Early Cretaceous. Production is from Jurassic Fangst Group sandstones with the Upper Jurassic Spekk Formation shales being the petroleum source and Cretaceous shales forming the seal.

== Climate ==
Climate data for Heidrun 1995-2020 (65 m)
Month	Jan	Feb	Mar	Apr	May	Jun	Jul	Aug	Sep	Oct	Nov	Dec	Year
Mean daily maximum °C (°F)	5.1 (41.2)	4.7 (40.5)	4.7 (40.5)	6.2 (43.2)	8.2 (46.8)	10.4 (50.7)	12.9 (55.2)	13.6 (56.5)	11.9 (53.4)	9.1 (48.4)	6.8 (44.2)	5.6 (42.1)	8.3 (46.9)
Mean daily minimum °C (°F)	2.6 (36.7)	2.1 (35.8)	2.2 (36.0)	3.9 (39.0)	5.9 (42.6)	8.3 (46.9)	10.8 (51.4)	11.6 (52.9)	9.9 (49.8)	7.1 (44.8)	4.6 (40.3)	3.2 (37.8)	6.0 (42.8)
Source: NOAA - WMO averages 91-2020 Norway
