= Eikþyrnir =

Stag in Norse mythology

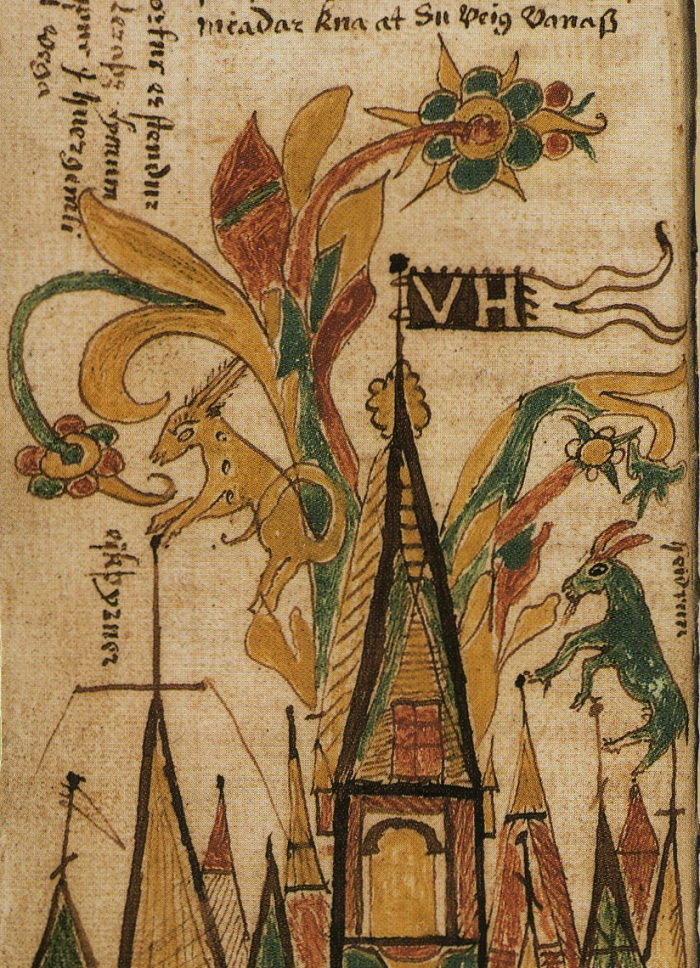
Eikþyrnir and Heiðrún have fun on top of Valhalla in this illustration from a 17th-century Icelandic manuscript.

Eikþyrnir or Eikthyrnir is a stag which stands upon Valhalla in Norse mythology.

== Etymology ==
The etymology of Eikþyrnir remains debatable. Anatoly Liberman suggests that Heiðþyrnir, the name of the lowest heaven in Scandinavian mythology (from heið "bright sky"), was cut into two, and on the basis of those halves the names of the heavenly stag Eikþyrnir and the heavenly goat Heiðrún were formed. The origin of -þyrnir is not entirely clear, but the associations with thorns is, most probably, due to folk etymology.

== Attestations ==
The following is related in the Gylfaginning section of Snorri Sturluson's Prose Edda after the description of Heiðrún.

Enn er meira mark at of hjörtinn Eirþyrni, [sic] er stendr á Valhöll ok bítr af limum þess trés, en af hornum <hans> verðr svá mikill dropi at niðr kemr í Hvergelmi, en þaðan af falla ár þær er svá heita: Síð, Víð, Sekin, Ekin, Svöl, Gunnþró, Fjörm, Fimbulþul, Gipul, Göpul, Gömul, Geirvimul, þessar falla um ásabygðir. Þessar eru enn nefndar: Þyn, Vin, Þöll, Böll, Gráð, Gunnþráin, Nyt, Nöt, Nönn, Hrönn, Vína, Veg, Svinn, Þjóðnuma. — (ch. 39; Normalized text of the R manuscript)

Even more worthy of note is the hart Eikthyrni, which stands in Valhall and bites from the limbs of the tree; and from his horns distils such abundant exudation that it comes down into Hvergelmir, and from thence fall those rivers called thus: Síd, Víd, Søkin, Eikin, Svöl, Gunnthrá, Fjörm, Fimbulthul, Gípul, Göpul, Gömul, Geirvimul. Those fall about the abodes of the Æsir; these also are recorded: Thyn, Vín, Thöll, Höll, Grád, Gunnthráin, Nyt, Nöt, Nönn, Hrönn, Vína, Vegsvinn, Thjódnuma. — Brodeur's translation

Brodeur follows the text of the T manuscript of the Prose Edda in putting the stag í Valhöll, "in Valhall", rather than á Valhöll, "upon Valhall", as the other manuscripts do. The more recent translation by Anthony Faulkes puts the stag on top of the building, which seems much more natural from the context and weight of the evidence.

Snorri's source for this information was almost certainly Grímnismál, where the following strophes are found.

Eikþyrnir heitir hiörtr, er stendr á höllo Heriaföðrs ok bítr af Læraðs limom; en af hans hornom drýpr i Hvergelmi, þaðan eigo vötn öll vega: Síð ok Víð, Sækin ok Eikin, Svöl ok Gunnþró, Fiörm ok Fimbulþul, Rín ok Rennandi, Gipul ok Göpul, Gömul ok Geirvimul, þær hverfa um hodd goða, Þyn ok Vin, Þöll ok Höll, Gráð ok Gunnþorin. Vína heitir enn, önnor Vegsvinn, þriðia Þióðnuma, Nyt ok Nöt, Nönn ok Hrönn, Slíð ok Hrið, Sylgr ok Ylgr, Víð ok Ván, Vönd ok Strönd, Giöll ok Leiptr, þær falla gumnom nær, en falla til heilar heðan. — Jón Helgason's edition	Eikthyrnir the hart is called, that stands o’er Odin's hall, and bits from Lærad's branches; from his horns fall drops into Hvergelmir, whence all waters rise:- Sid and Vid, Soekin and Eikin, Svöl and Gunntro, Fiörm and Fimbulthul, Rin and Rennandi, Gipul and Göpul, Gömul and Geirvimul: they round the gods' dwellings wind. Thyn and Vin, Thöll and Höll, Grad and Gunnthorin. Vina one is called, a second Vegsvin, a third Thiodnuma; Nyt and Nöt, Nön and Hrön, Slid and Hrid, Sylg and Ylg, Vid and Van, Vönd and Strönd, Giöll and Leipt; these (two) fall near to men, but fall hence to Hel. — Thorpe's translation

== In popular culture ==
Eikþyrnir appears in the video game Fire Emblem Heroes, being added in June 2024, being made into a winter variant (December 13, 2024) a summer variant (July 8, 2025), another summer cheerleader variant (July 7, 2026) and then during a yearly event known as "Choose Your Legends" a variant known as Brave Eikþyrnir came out (August 15, 2025), making him have 5 different variants.

Eikþyrnir also appears in the video game Arknights, making his debut as an NPC in Skógrinn Svartr Vill Einn Draumr and later reappearing in Expeditioner's Jǫklumarkar.

Valheim, a game where you play a warrior proving themselves to Odin; references Eikþyrnir with a boss referred in game as Eikthyr.

In Palworld, the Pals Eikthyrdeer and Eikthyrdeer Terra are references to Eikþyrnir.
