= Edøy =

Edøy may refer to:

== People ==
- Oskar Edøy (1916-2008), a Norwegian politician for the Labour Party

== Places ==
- Edøya, an island in Smøla Municipality in Møre og Romsdal county, Norway
- Edøy Municipality, a former municipality in Møre og Romsdal county, Norway
- Edøy Church, a church in Smøla Municipality in Møre og Romsdal county, Norway
- Old Edøy Church, a historic church in Smøla Municipality in Møre og Romsdal county, Norway
