= Edøy Municipality =

Former municipality in Møre og Romsdal, Norway

Edøy Municipality Edøy herad
- Former municipality
- Edø herred (historic name)
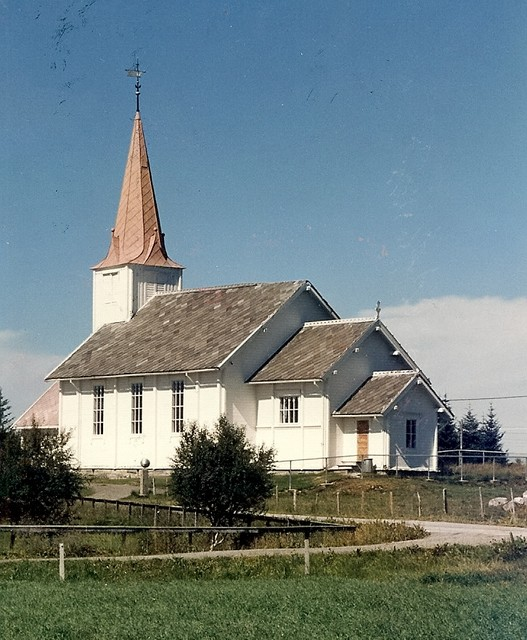
- View of the Edøy Church

- Møre og Romsdal within Norway

- Edøy within Møre og Romsdal
- Coordinates: 63°20′02″N 08°03′56″E
- Country: Norway
- County: Møre og Romsdal
- District: Nordmøre
- Established: 1 Jan 1838
  - Created as: Formannskapsdistrikt
- Disestablished: 1 Jan 1960
  - Succeeded by: Smøla Municipality

Government
  - Mayor (1948-1959): Ove Gjernes (V)

Area (upon dissolution)
  - Total: 150.6 km^{2} (58.1 sq mi)
  - Rank: #445 in Norway
- Highest elevation: 69.62 m (228.4 ft)

Population (1959)
  - Total: 1,115
  - Rank: #629 in Norway
  - Density: 7.4/km^{2} (19/sq mi)
  - Change (10 years): ▼ −4.5%

Official language
  - Norwegian form: Nynorsk
- Time zone: UTC+01:00 (CET)
  - Summer (DST): UTC+02:00 (CEST)
- ISO 3166 code: NO-1573

Edøy is a former municipality in Møre og Romsdal county, Norway. The municipality existed from 1838 until its dissolution in 1960. It was located in the southern and central parts of the present-day Smøla Municipality. The old municipality originally encompassed all the islands surrounding the Edøyfjorden. This included the islands of Smøla, Tustna, Stabblandet, and the many smaller islands between the larger ones. The island of Edøya lies between the two and that was the center of the old municipality. Over time, parts of Edøy were split off to form other municipalities. At the time it was dissolved, Edøy Municipality was 150.6 square kilometres (58.1 sq mi). The Old Edøy Church and later the (new) Edøy Church were the main churches for the municipality.

Prior to its dissolution in 1960, the 150.6-square-kilometre (58.1 sq mi) municipality was the 445th largest by area out of the 743 municipalities in Norway. Edøy Municipality was the 629th most populous municipality in Norway with a population of about 1,115. The municipality's population density was 7.4 inhabitants per square kilometre (19/sq mi) and its population had decreased by 4.5% over the previous 5-year period.

== General information ==
The parish of Edø (later spelled Edøy) was established as a municipality on 1 January 1838 (see formannskapsdistrikt law). A royal resolution of 3 May 1873 directed that the southern Tustern parish be removed from Edøy Municipality to create the new Tustern Municipality effective on 1 January 1874. This left Edøy Municipality with 2,166 inhabitants.

On 1 January 1915, the large Edøy Municipality was split into three to form: Edøy Municipality (population: 973) in the south, Hopen Municipality (population: 1,050) in the northeast, and Brattvær Municipality (population: 1,452) in the northwest.

During the 1960s, there were many municipal mergers across Norway due to the work of the Schei Committee. On 1 January 1960, the 1915 partition was reversed, merging Brattvær Municipality (population: 1,361), Edøy Municipality (population: 1,135), and Hopen Municipality (population: 1,550), creating the new Smøla Municipality.

=== Name ===
The municipality (originally the parish) is named after the old Edøy farm (Old Norse: Æðey) since the Old Edøy Church was built there. The first element is æðr which means "eider", a common type of sea bird for the area. The last element is ey which means "island". Historically, the name of the municipality was spelled Edø. On 3 November 1917, a royal resolution changed the spelling of the name of the municipality to Edøy.

=== Churches ===
The Church of Norway had one parish (sokn) within Edøy Municipality. At the time of the municipal dissolution, it was part of the Edøy prestegjeld and the Nordmøre prosti (deanery) in the Diocese of Nidaros.

Churches in Edøy Municipality
Parish (sokn)	Church name	Location of the church	Year built
Edøy	Edøy Church	Straumen	1885
Edøy	Old Edøy Church	Edøya	1190

In 2019, archaeologists from the Norwegian Institute for Cultural Heritage Research using large-scale high-resolution georadar technology, determined that a 17-metre (56 ft) long Viking ship was buried near the Edøy Church. Traces of a small settlement were also found. They estimate the ship's age as over 1,000 years: from the Merovingian or Viking period. The group planned to conduct additional searches in the area. A similar burial was found previously by NIKU archaeologists in 2018, in Gjellestad.

== Geography ==
The municipality was located on the southern part of the large island of Smøla, along with the surrounding smaller islets and skerries including Kuli and Edøya. Brattvær Municipality was located to the northwest and Hopen Municipality was located to the northeast. The highest point in the municipality was the 69.62-metre (228.4 ft) tall mountain Ramndalshaugen on the small island of Kuli.

== Government ==
While it existed, Edøy Municipality was responsible for primary education (through 10th grade), outpatient health services, senior citizen services, welfare and other social services, zoning, economic development, and municipal roads and utilities. The municipality was governed by a municipal council of directly elected representatives. The mayor was indirectly elected by a vote of the municipal council. The municipality was under the jurisdiction of the Frostating Court of Appeal.

=== Municipal council ===
The municipal council (Herredsstyre) of Edøy Municipality was made up of 17 representatives that were elected to four year terms. The tables below show the historical composition of the council by political party.

Edøy heradsstyre 1955–1959
Party name (in Nynorsk)	Number of representatives
Labour Party (Arbeidarpartiet)	4
Liberal Party (Venstre)	8
Local List(s) (Lokale lister)	5
Total number of members:	17
Note: On 1 January 1960, Edøy Municipality became part of Smøla Municipality.

Edøy heradsstyre 1951–1955
Party name (in Nynorsk)	Number of representatives
Labour Party (Arbeidarpartiet)	7
Liberal Party (Venstre)	9
Total number of members:	16

Edøy heradsstyre 1947–1951
Party name (in Nynorsk)	Number of representatives
Labour Party (Arbeidarpartiet)	7
Liberal Party (Venstre)	6
Local List(s) (Lokale lister)	3
Total number of members:	16

Edøy heradsstyre 1945–1947
Party name (in Nynorsk)	Number of representatives
Labour Party (Arbeidarpartiet)	6
Liberal Party (Venstre)	6
Joint List(s) of Non-Socialist Parties (Borgarlege Felleslister)	4
Total number of members:	16

Edøy heradsstyre 1937–1941*
Party name (in Nynorsk)	Number of representatives
Local List(s) (Lokale lister)	16
Total number of members:	16
Note: Due to the German occupation of Norway during World War II, no elections were held for new municipal councils until after the war ended in 1945.

=== Mayors ===
The mayor (Nynorsk: ordførar) of Edøy Municipality was the political leader of the municipality and the chairperson of the municipal council. The following people have held this position:

- 1838–1842: Halvor Christian Heyerdahl
- 1843–1844: Jørgen Foss
- 1845–1848: Paul Ulrik Stabell
- 1849–1850: Halvor Kulø
- 1851–1855: Daniel A. Rognskaug
- 1856–1859: Paul Ulrik Stabell
- 1860–1863: Sverker Moe
- 1864–1871: Jonas Halse
- 1872–1877: Knut Kuløy
- 1878–1884: Ole Soleim
- 1885–1892: Iver Paulsen Høsteng
- 1893–1909: Ole Soleim
- 1910–1913: Bastian Width
- 1914–1928: Halvard Knutsen Kuløy
- 1928–1930: O. Th. Engdal
- 1931–1937: John Lervik
- 1938–1941: Johan Gjøstøl
- 1945–1945: Ola Schjølberg (Ap)
- 1946–1947: Olav J. Gjernes (V)
- 1948–1959: Ove Gjernes (V)

== See also ==
- List of former municipalities of Norway
