= Smøla Municipality =

Municipality in Møre og Romsdal, Norway

Smøla Municipality Smøla kommune
- Municipality
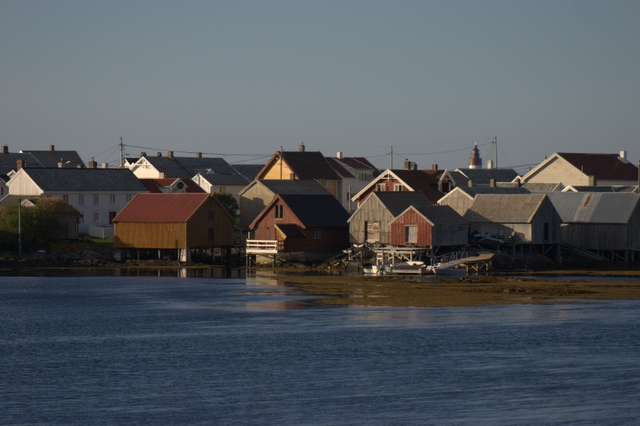
- View of Veiholmen

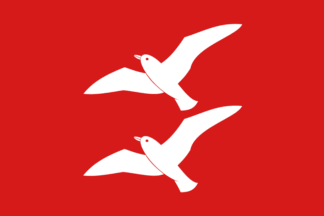
- Flag Coat of arms

- Møre og Romsdal within Norway

- Smøla within Møre og Romsdal
- Coordinates: 63°24′07″N 08°01′45″E
- Country: Norway
- County: Møre og Romsdal
- District: Nordmøre
- Established: 1 Jan 1960
  - Preceded by: Edøy Municipality, Brattvær Municipality, and Hopen Municipality
- Administrative centre: Hopen

Government
  - Mayor (2019): Svein Roksvåg (Sp)

Area
  - Total: 271.91 km^{2} (104.99 sq mi)
  - Land: 261.10 km^{2} (100.81 sq mi)
  - Water: 10.81 km^{2} (4.17 sq mi) 4%
  - Rank: #272 in Norway
- Highest elevation: 69.62 m (228.4 ft)

Population (2024)
  - Total: 2,159
  - Rank: #273 in Norway
  - Density: 7.9/km^{2} (20/sq mi)
  - Change (10 years): ▼ −0.3%
- Demonym: Smølværing

Official language
  - Norwegian form: Neutral
- Time zone: UTC+01:00 (CET)
  - Summer (DST): UTC+02:00 (CEST)
- ISO 3166 code: NO-1573
- Website: Official website

Smøla is a municipality in Møre og Romsdal county, Norway. It is part of the Nordmøre region. The administrative centre of the municipality is the village of Hopen, other villages include Dyrnes, Råket, and Veiholmen.

The 272-square-kilometre (105 sq mi) municipality is the 272nd largest by area out of the 357 municipalities in Norway. Smøla Municipality is the 273rd most populous municipality in Norway with a population of 2,159. The municipality's population density is 7.9 inhabitants per square kilometre (20/sq mi) and its population has decreased by 0.3% over the previous 10-year period.

== General information ==
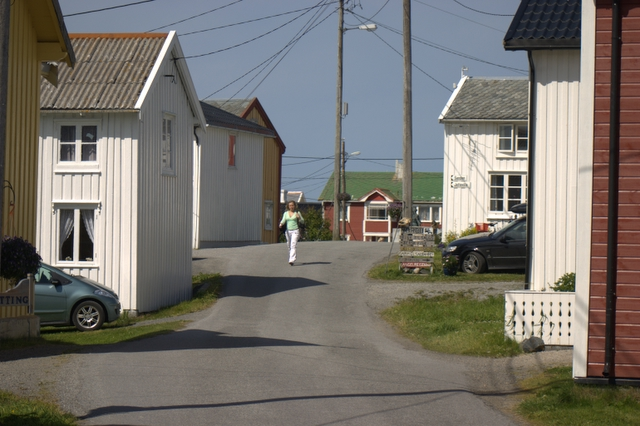
The fishing village of Veiholmen

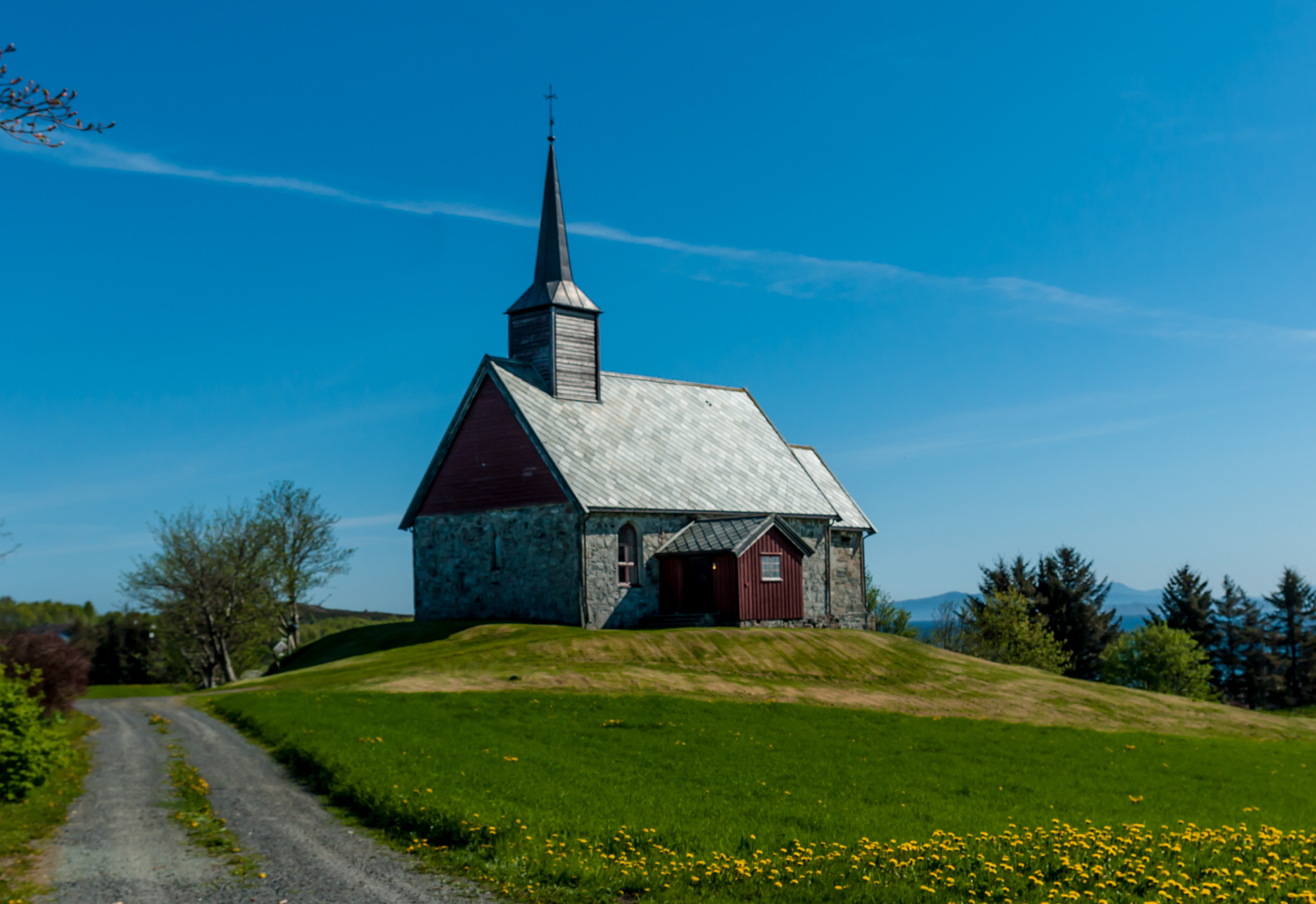
View of the Old Edøy Church

During the 1960s, there were many municipal mergers across Norway due to the work of the Schei Committee. The new Smøla Municipality was established on 1 January 1960 after the merger of Edøy Municipality (population: 1,135), Brattvær Municipality (population: 1,361), and Hopen Municipality (population: 1,550). The initial population of the new municipality was 4,046. The boundaries have not changed since that time.

=== Name ===
The municipality is named after the main island of Smøla (Old Norse: Smyl or Smjöl). The name is probably related to the Danish word smule or the modern Norwegian word smuldre which both mean "crumble", referring to the thousands of small islands and islets around the main island. Researchers at Technische Universität Berlin have claimed that Smøla is the island which Pytheas called Thule (Ancient Greek: Θούλη, Thoúlē).

=== Coat of arms ===
The coat of arms was granted on 10 March 1989. The official blazon is "Gules, two seagulls volant argent" (Norwegian: I rødt to oppflygende sølv måker). This means the arms have a red field (background) and the charge is two flying seagulls. The charge has a tincture of argent which means it is commonly colored white, but if it is made out of metal, then silver is used. This design was chosen to highlight the fact that this is an island community and that is a common type of bird in the area. The arms were designed by Jarle Skuseth. The municipal flag has the same design as the coat of arms.

=== Churches ===
The Church of Norway has three parishes (sokn) within Smøla Municipality. It is part of the Ytre Nordmøre prosti (deanery) in the Diocese of Møre.

Churches in Smøla Municipality
Parish (sokn)	Church name	Location of the church	Year built
Brattvær	Brattvær Church	near Råket	1917
Edøy	Edøy Church	Straumen	1885
Edøy	Old Edøy Church	Edøya	c. 1190
Hopen	Hopen Church	Hopen	1892

In 2019, archaeologists from the Norwegian Institute for Cultural Heritage Research using large-scale high-resolution ground-penetrating radar, determined that a 17-metre (56 ft) long Viking ship was buried on the island of Edøya near the Old Edøy Church. They estimate its age as over 1,000 years, from the Merovingian or Viking period; the group hopes to conduct additional searches in the area. A similar burial was found previously by the group, in Gjellestad.

== Geography ==
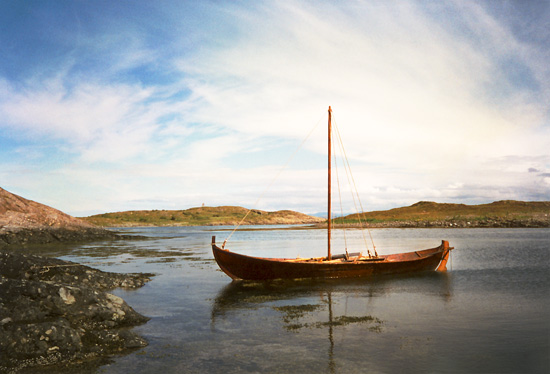
View of a boat in Smøla

The municipality of Smøla is located north of the town of Kristiansund, off the western coast of Norway. The municipality consists of the main island of Smøla and more than 3,000 smaller ones. The 216-square-kilometre (83 sq mi) main island is very flat, the highest peak reaches 64 m (210 ft) above sea level. The highest peak in the municipality is 69.62 m (228.4 ft) above sea level, being Ramndalshaugen on the island of Kuli. Almost all of the land area consists of bogs and cliffs; only 5% is cultivated into agricultural land. Other minor islands in the municipality include Edøya, Kuli, Brattværet, and Veiholmen. The municipality is separated from the rest of Norway by the Edøyfjorden to the south.

Due to the vast number of small islands surrounding Smøla, there are several lighthouses. The three most notable ones are Haugjegla Lighthouse (north of Smøla), Skalmen Lighthouse, (northwest of Smøla), and Tyrhaug Lighthouse (southeast of Smøla in the Edøyfjorden).

Scientists of the Institute of Geodesy and Geoinformationtechnique of Technische Universität Berlin were testing the antique maps of Ptolemy and recognized a pattern of calculation mistakes that occurred when one tried to convert the old coordinates from Ptolemy into modern cartographical maps. The scientists believe that, when one compensates for these mistakes, the mythological location Thule corresponds to the island of Smøla.

=== Climate ===
Smøla has a temperate oceanic climate, also known as a marine west coast climate (Cfb), with a cool summer and mild winter. The year amplitude is only 11.1 °C (20 °F) from the coldest to the warmest month. The driest season is from April - July, and the wettest season is autumn and winter. The record high is from July 2025, and the record low is from February 2010.

Climate data for Veiholmen, Smøla 1991-2020 (5 m, precipitation from Moldstad, extremes 2002-2025)
Month	Jan	Feb	Mar	Apr	May	Jun	Jul	Aug	Sep	Oct	Nov	Dec	Year
Record high °C (°F)	11.2 (52.2)	11.2 (52.2)	13.8 (56.8)	20.1 (68.2)	22.5 (72.5)	26 (79)	28 (82)	24.4 (75.9)	20.8 (69.4)	20.7 (69.3)	16.1 (61.0)	11.8 (53.2)	28 (82)
Daily mean °C (°F)	3.5 (38.3)	2.9 (37.2)	3.5 (38.3)	5.6 (42.1)	7.9 (46.2)	10.6 (51.1)	13.2 (55.8)	14 (57)	12.3 (54.1)	8.6 (47.5)	6.2 (43.2)	4.1 (39.4)	7.7 (45.9)
Record low °C (°F)	−8.9 (16.0)	−11.4 (11.5)	−5.8 (21.6)	−1.9 (28.6)	0.5 (32.9)	4.1 (39.4)	7.4 (45.3)	7.3 (45.1)	3.1 (37.6)	−0.2 (31.6)	−7 (19)	−7.3 (18.9)	−11.4 (11.5)
Average precipitation mm (inches)	123 (4.8)	110 (4.3)	105 (4.1)	70 (2.8)	58 (2.3)	67 (2.6)	64 (2.5)	101 (4.0)	141 (5.6)	128 (5.0)	120 (4.7)	149 (5.9)	1,236 (48.6)
Source: Norwegian Meteorological Institute

== Government ==
Smøla Municipality is responsible for primary education (through 10th grade), outpatient health services, senior citizen services, welfare and other social services, zoning, economic development, and municipal roads and utilities. The municipality is governed by a municipal council of directly elected representatives. The mayor is indirectly elected by a vote of the municipal council. The municipality is under the jurisdiction of the Nordmøre og Romsdal District Court and the Frostating Court of Appeal. Waste management was provided by the inter-municipal agency Nordmøre Interkommunale Renovasjonsselskap until 2020, after which it merged into ReMidt.

=== Municipal council ===
The municipal council (Kommunestyre) of Smøla Municipality is made up of 17 representatives that are elected to four-year terms. The tables below show the current and historical composition of the council by political party.

Smøla kommunestyre 2023–2027
Party name (in Norwegian)	Number of representatives
Labour Party (Arbeiderpartiet)	4
Conservative Party (Høyre)	2
Centre Party (Senterpartiet)	9
Liberal Party (Venstre)	2
Total number of members:	17

Smøla kommunestyre 2019–2023
Party name (in Norwegian)	Number of representatives
Labour Party (Arbeiderpartiet)	6
Conservative Party (Høyre)	2
Centre Party (Senterpartiet)	7
Liberal Party (Venstre)	1
Smøla to Trøndelag (Smøla til Trøndelag)	1
Total number of members:	17

Smøla kommunestyre 2015–2019
Party name (in Norwegian)	Number of representatives
Labour Party (Arbeiderpartiet)	12
Progress Party (Fremskrittspartiet)	1
Conservative Party (Høyre)	3
Centre Party (Senterpartiet)	3
Liberal Party (Venstre)	2
Total number of members:	21

Smøla kommunestyre 2011–2015
Party name (in Norwegian)	Number of representatives
Labour Party (Arbeiderpartiet)	7
Progress Party (Fremskrittspartiet)	1
Conservative Party (Høyre)	6
Centre Party (Senterpartiet)	2
Socialist Left Party (Sosialistisk Venstreparti)	1
Liberal Party (Venstre)	4
Total number of members:	21

Smøla kommunestyre 2007–2011
Party name (in Norwegian)	Number of representatives
Labour Party (Arbeiderpartiet)	3
Progress Party (Fremskrittspartiet)	2
Conservative Party (Høyre)	6
Christian Democratic Party (Kristelig Folkeparti)	1
Centre Party (Senterpartiet)	1
Socialist Left Party (Sosialistisk Venstreparti)	1
Liberal Party (Venstre)	7
Total number of members:	21

Smøla kommunestyre 2003–2007
Party name (in Norwegian)	Number of representatives
Labour Party (Arbeiderpartiet)	4
Conservative Party (Høyre)	3
Christian Democratic Party (Kristelig Folkeparti)	1
Centre Party (Senterpartiet)	2
Socialist Left Party (Sosialistisk Venstreparti)	3
Liberal Party (Venstre)	8
Total number of members:	21

Smøla kommunestyre 1999–2003
Party name (in Norwegian)	Number of representatives
Labour Party (Arbeiderpartiet)	4
Conservative Party (Høyre)	4
Christian Democratic Party (Kristelig Folkeparti)	2
Centre Party (Senterpartiet)	3
Liberal Party (Venstre)	8
Total number of members:	21

Smøla kommunestyre 1995–1999
Party name (in Norwegian)	Number of representatives
Labour Party (Arbeiderpartiet)	5
Conservative Party (Høyre)	3
Christian Democratic Party (Kristelig Folkeparti)	1
Centre Party (Senterpartiet)	3
Socialist Left Party (Sosialistisk Venstreparti)	2
Liberal Party (Venstre)	7
Total number of members:	21

Smøla kommunestyre 1991–1995
Party name (in Norwegian)	Number of representatives
Labour Party (Arbeiderpartiet)	5
Conservative Party (Høyre)	6
Christian Democratic Party (Kristelig Folkeparti)	1
Centre Party (Senterpartiet)	3
Socialist Left Party (Sosialistisk Venstreparti)	3
Liberal Party (Venstre)	3
Total number of members:	21

Smøla kommunestyre 1987–1991
Party name (in Norwegian)	Number of representatives
Labour Party (Arbeiderpartiet)	5
Conservative Party (Høyre)	4
Christian Democratic Party (Kristelig Folkeparti)	1
Centre Party (Senterpartiet)	4
Liberal Party (Venstre)	2
Veidholmen local list (Veidholmen kretslist)	2
North Smøla local list (Nordsmøla Kretsliste)	3
Total number of members:	21

Smøla kommunestyre 1983–1987
Party name (in Norwegian)	Number of representatives
Labour Party (Arbeiderpartiet)	9
Conservative Party (Høyre)	4
Christian Democratic Party (Kristelig Folkeparti)	2
Centre Party (Senterpartiet)	5
Liberal Party (Venstre)	2
Veidholmen local list (Veidholmen kretslist)	4
Local list for South Smøla (Kretsliste for Sørsmøla)	1
Total number of members:	27

Smøla kommunestyre 1979–1983
Party name (in Norwegian)	Number of representatives
Labour Party (Arbeiderpartiet)	8
Conservative Party (Høyre)	4
Christian Democratic Party (Kristelig Folkeparti)	2
Centre Party (Senterpartiet)	7
Liberal Party (Venstre)	3
Non-party list (Upolitisk liste)	4
Total number of members:	27

Smøla kommunestyre 1975–1979
Party name (in Norwegian)	Number of representatives
Labour Party (Arbeiderpartiet)	9
Conservative Party (Høyre)	3
Christian Democratic Party (Kristelig Folkeparti)	4
Centre Party (Senterpartiet)	6
Socialist Left Party (Sosialistisk Venstreparti)	2
Liberal Party (Venstre)	3
Total number of members:	27

Smøla kommunestyre 1971–1975
Party name (in Norwegian)	Number of representatives
Labour Party (Arbeiderpartiet)	9
Conservative Party (Høyre)	2
Christian Democratic Party (Kristelig Folkeparti)	3
Centre Party (Senterpartiet)	4
Liberal Party (Venstre)	4
Local List(s) (Lokale lister)	5
Total number of members:	27

Smøla kommunestyre 1967–1971
Party name (in Norwegian)	Number of representatives
Labour Party (Arbeiderpartiet)	12
Conservative Party (Høyre)	3
Christian Democratic Party (Kristelig Folkeparti)	3
Centre Party (Senterpartiet)	3
Socialist People's Party (Sosialistisk Folkeparti)	2
Liberal Party (Venstre)	4
Total number of members:	27

Smøla kommunestyre 1963–1967
Party name (in Norwegian)	Number of representatives
Labour Party (Arbeiderpartiet)	13
Conservative Party (Høyre)	3
Christian Democratic Party (Kristelig Folkeparti)	5
Centre Party (Senterpartiet)	2
Liberal Party (Venstre)	4
Total number of members:	27

Smøla kommunestyre 1960–1963
Party name (in Norwegian)	Number of representatives
Labour Party (Arbeiderpartiet)	11
Conservative Party (Høyre)	5
Christian Democratic Party (Kristelig Folkeparti)	5
Liberal Party (Venstre)	5
Local List(s) (Lokale lister)	1
Total number of members:	27
Note: On 1 January 1960, Edøy Municipality, Brattvær Municipality, and Hopen Municipality were merged to form the new Smøla Municipality.

=== Mayors ===
The mayor (Norwegian: ordfører) of Smøla Municipality is the political leader of the municipality and the chairperson of the municipal council. Here is a list of people who have held this position:

- 1960–1963: Henning Talleraas (H)
- 1964–1967: Aksel Stølen (Ap)
- 1968–1969: Petter Dalen (Ap)
- 1970–1971: Aksel Stølen (Ap)
- 1972–1974: Einar Korsand (V)
- 1974–1975: Olaf Birkeland (Sp)
- 1975–1975: Oddleiv Torske (KrF)
- 1976–1979: Karle Gjernes (V)
- 1980–1985: Gudmund Restad (Sp)
- 1985–1987: Hans Vallestad (H)
- 1988–1991: Joralf Flataukan (H)
- 1991–2011: Iver Nordseth (V)
- 2011–2019: Roger Osen (Ap)
- 2019–present: Svein Roksvåg (Sp)

== Media ==
The newspaper Nordvestnytt has been published in Smøla since 1988.

== Energy ==
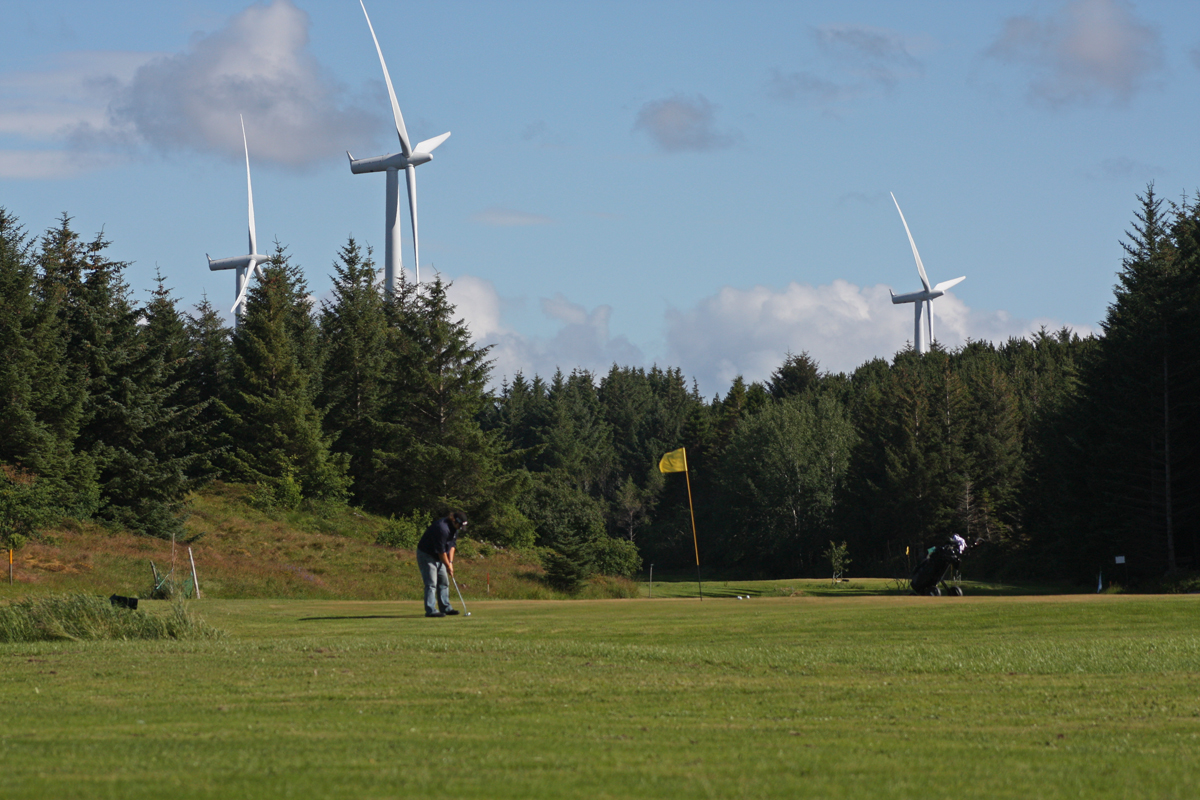
View of some wind turbines

On 5 September 2002, Statkraft announced the opening of the Smøla Wind Farm, a 40-megawatt (54,000 hp) wind project comprising twenty 2-megawatt (2,700 hp) wind turbines by Norway's King Harald V. This corresponds to phase one of the wind project, which when completed will have a total installed capacity of more than 110 megawatts (150,000 hp). Phase two was opened in September 2005 and included forty-eight 2.3-megawatt (3,100 hp) wind turbines. All in all, the wind energy production project consists of 68 windmills, making it among the largest wind projects in Europe. With a total generating capacity of 150 megawatts (200,000 hp), the Smøla wind farm's 68 turbines account for more than half of the installed wind power capacity in Norway. The total generating capacity is equivalent to 450 GWh of electricity per year, which corresponds to the average annual power consumption of 22,500 Norwegian households.

== Attractions ==
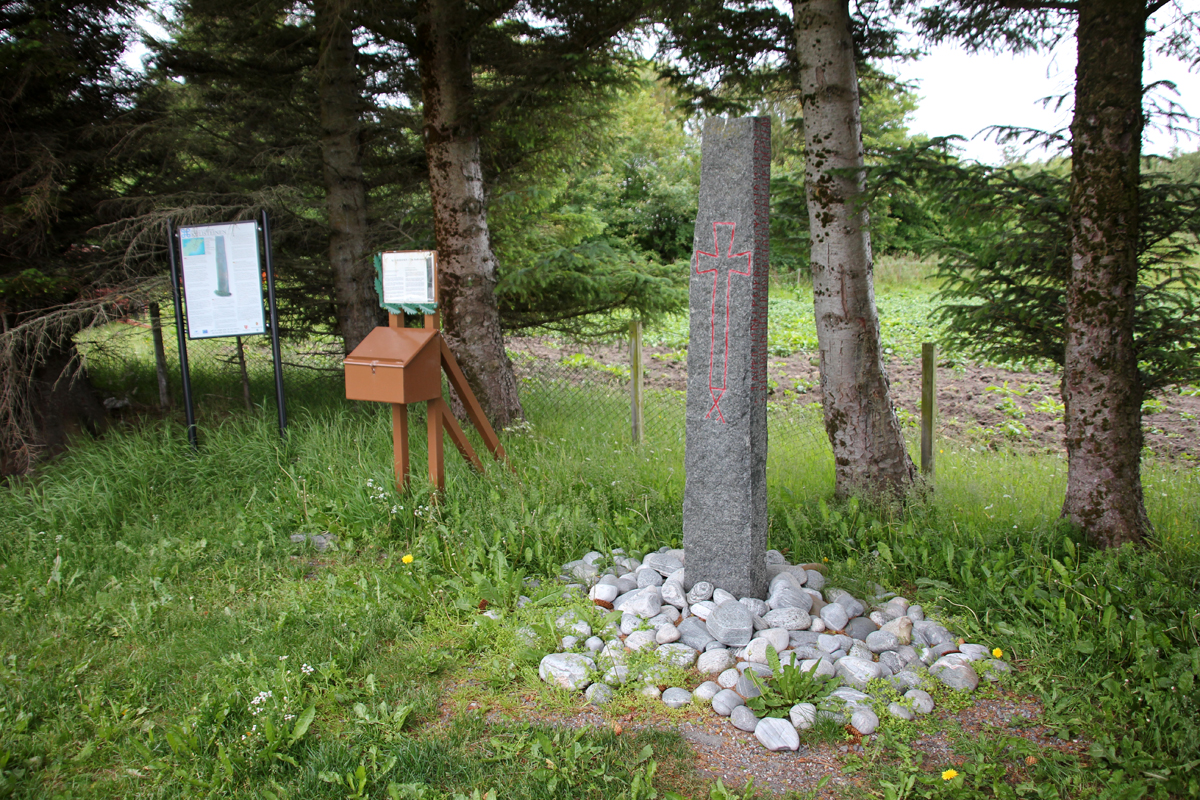
View of the Kulisteinen

- Veiholmen is a large fishing village, north of the main island.
- Kulisteinen (the Kuli stone), probably one of the best remains which tells about early Christianity in Norway. On one side it has a large cross, which was well known for a long time. Less well known was a runic inscription on the rim of the stone.
- Old Edøy Church, a restored church dating back to about the year 1190.
- Deep-sea fishing is a part of the natural environment of Smøla. Smøla provides facilities, guided fishing trips and possibilities for renting fisherman's boats and needed equipment. Participants can expect to catch a large selection of deep sea fish in this area: herring, cod, redfish, perch, monkfish, Atlantic halibut, plaice, carp, char, mackerel, and others.

== Notable people ==
- Oluf Skarpnes (1932 in Smøla - 2019), a Norwegian jurist and public servant
- Kåre Bryn (born 1944 in Smøla), a Norwegian diplomat
- Ingar Knudtsen (born 1944 in Smøla), a novelist and poet
- Marianne Schröder (born 1977 in Smøla), a model
