= Grisvågøya =

Island in Møre og Romsdal, Norway

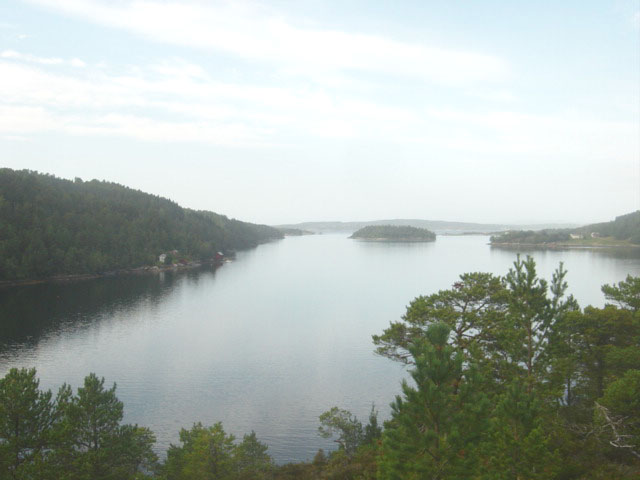
- View of the Mjosund on the island of Grisvågøy
- Interactive map of Grisvågøya

Geography
- Location: Møre og Romsdal, Norway
- Coordinates: 63.3174°N 8.4170°E
- Area: 13.86 km^{2} (5.35 sq mi)
- Length: 6.2 km (3.85 mi)
- Width: 3.3 km (2.05 mi)
- Highest elevation: 118 m (387 ft)
- Highest point: Hiåsen

Administration
- Norway
- County: Møre og Romsdal
- Municipality: Aure Municipality

Demographics
- Population: 90 (2015)
- Pop. density: 6.49/km^{2} (16.81/sq mi)

Grisvågøya is an island in Aure Municipality in Møre og Romsdal county, Norway. The 13.86-square-kilometre (5.35 sq mi) island is located on the south side of the Edøyfjorden/Trondheimsleia. There are many islands around Grisvågøya including Skardsøya to the east, Ertvågsøya to the south, Edøya, and Smøla to the west, and Hitra across the fjord to the north. The sparsely populated island of Grisvågøya has a bridge connecting it to the neighboring island of Skardsøya to the east which has two different bridges that connect it to the mainland. In 2015, the island had 90 residents living on it.

== See also ==
- List of islands of Norway
