= Tyrhaug Lighthouse =

Coastal lighthouse in Smøla, Norway

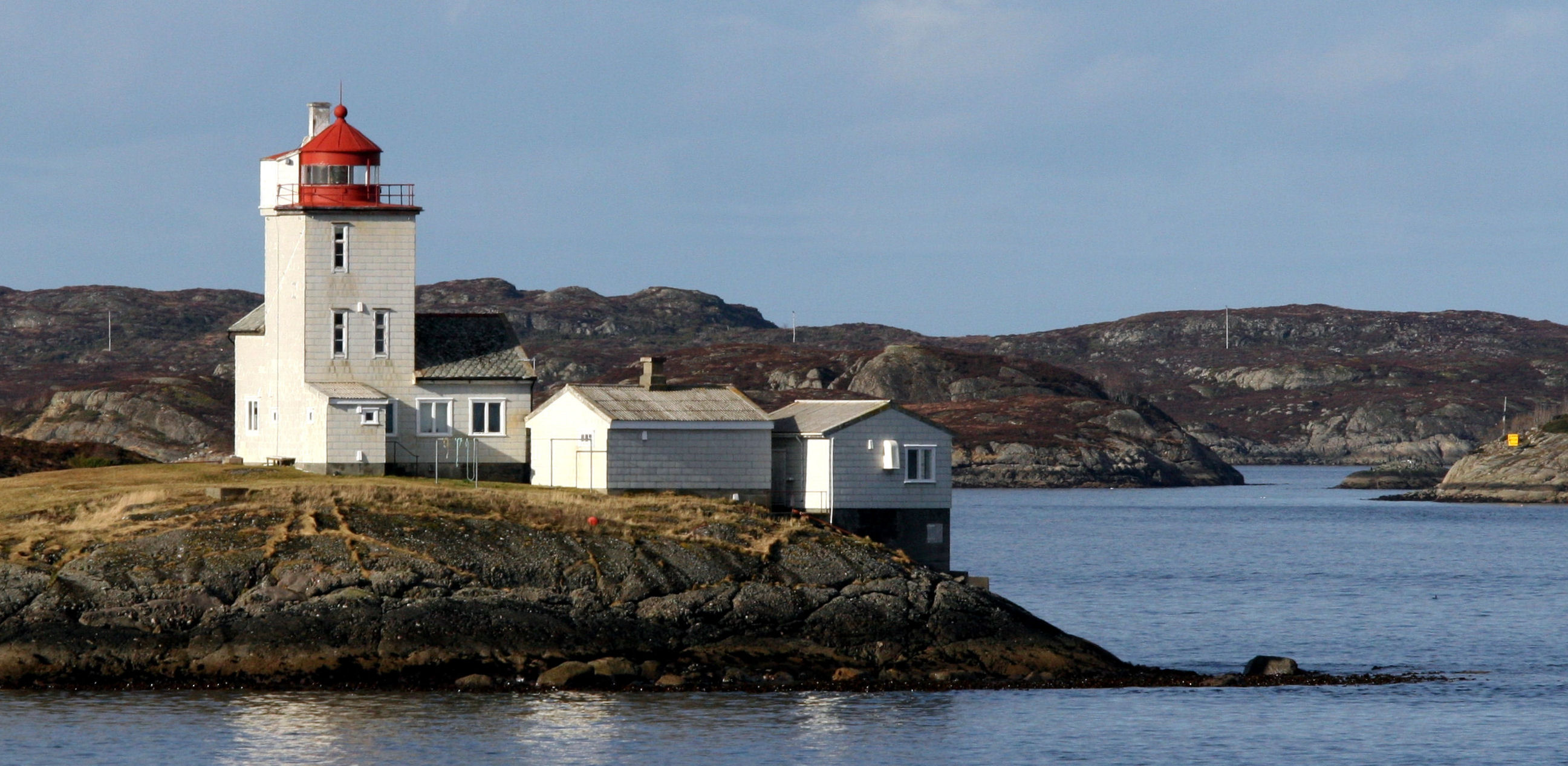
- Tyrhaug Lighthouse
- Location: Møre og Romsdal; Norway
- Coordinates: 63°18′37.5″N 08°13′36.4″E

Tower
- Constructed: 1833
- Automated: 1967
- Height: 14.2 metres (47 ft)
- Shape: square tower with balcony and lantern attached to keeper's house
- Markings: white tower, red balcony and lantern
- Heritage: cultural heritage preservation in Norway

Light
- Focal height: 17.8 metres (58 ft)
- Intensity: 20,700 candela
- Range: 13.4 nmi (24.8 km; 15.4 mi)
- Characteristic: Oc (2) WRG

Tyrhaug Lighthouse (Norwegian: Tyrhaug fyr; historical: Kyrhaug) is a coastal lighthouse located in Smøla Municipality, Møre og Romsdal county, Norway. It sits in the Edøyfjorden on the islet of Ringholmen, east of the island of Edøya, off the southeast coast of the main island of Smøla. The lighthouse is only accessible by boat.

== History ==
The lighthouse was established in 1833 and automated in 1967. The 14-metre (46 ft) tall, square, white tower is painted white with a red top. The light emits white, red or green light (depending on direction), occulting twice during each period. The 20,700-candela light can be seen for up to 13.4 nautical miles (24.8 km; 15.4 mi).

== See also ==
- Lighthouses in Norway
- List of lighthouses in Norway
