= Nordseth =

Nordseth is a surname. Notable people with the surname include:

- Iver G. Nordseth (born 1951), Norwegian politician
- Trond Nordseth (born 1974), Norwegian footballer
- Tore Nordseth (born 1966), Norwegian politician
