= Skalmen Lighthouse =

Coastal lighthouse in Smøla, Norway

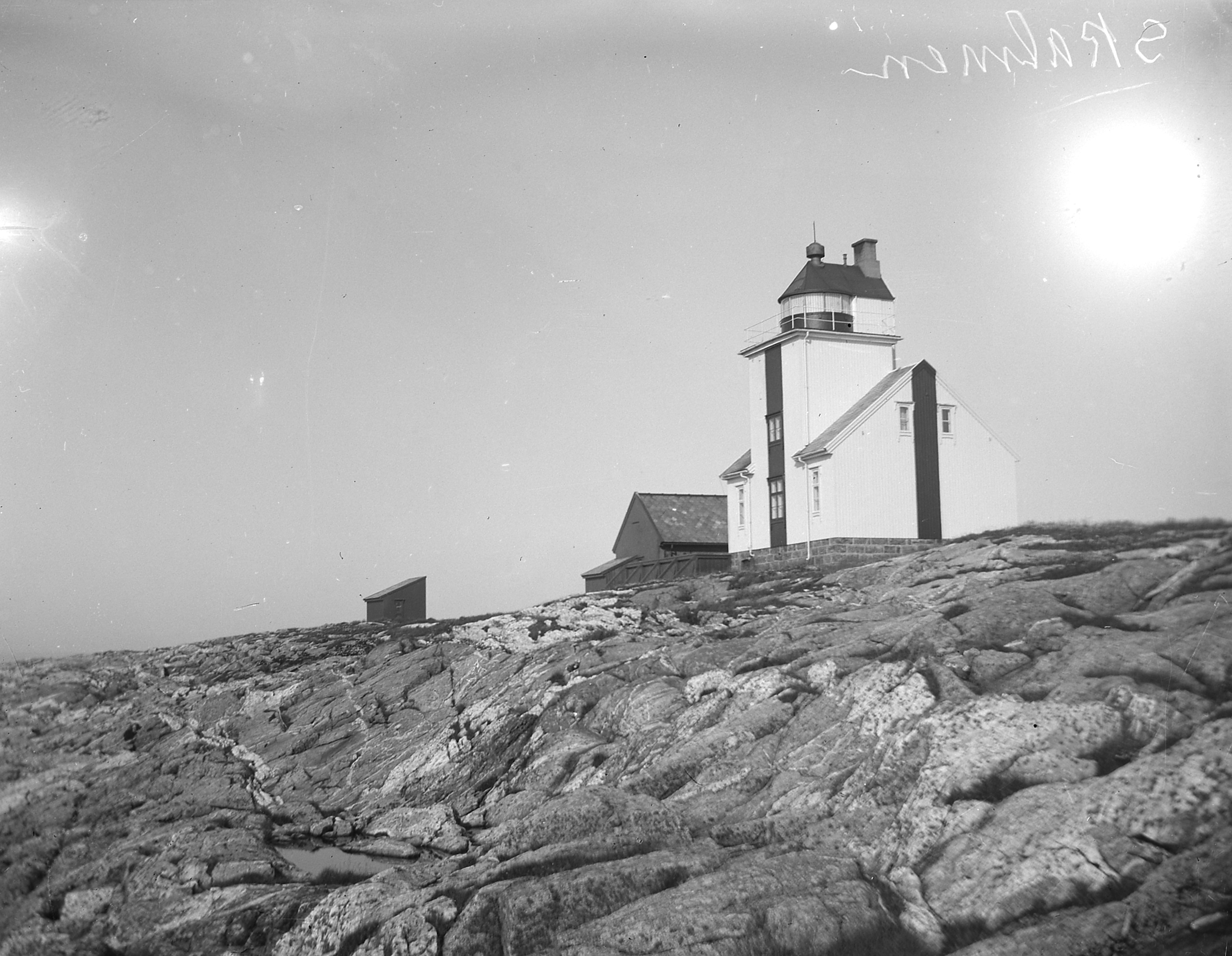
- Location: Smøla Municipality; Møre og Romsdal; Norway
- Coordinates: 63°28′19″N 07°45′25″E

Tower
- Constructed: 1907 (first)
- Construction: wooden tower
- Automated: 2002
- Height: 15.5 metres (51 ft)
- Shape: square tower with balcony and lantern attached to keeper's house
- Markings: white tower, red lantern

Light
- First lit: 1962 (current)
- Focal height: 24 metres (79 ft)
- Intensity: 79,200 candela
- Range: 14.8 nmi (27.4 km; 17.0 mi)
- Characteristic: Fl W 30s. Iso R 2s.

Skalmen Lighthouse (Norwegian: Skalmen fyr) is a coastal lighthouse located in Smøla Municipality, Møre og Romsdal county, Norway. The lighthouse is located on a small islet about 6.5 kilometres (4.0 mi) northwest of the villages of Råket and Dyrnes on the main island of Smøla.

== History ==
The lighthouse was established in 1907 and automated in 2002. The 16-metre (52 ft) tall tower is attached to a lighthouse keeper's house. The main light on top of the lighthouse emits one white flash every 30 seconds. The 79,200-candela main light can be seen for up to 14.8 nautical miles (27.4 km; 17.0 mi). There is also a secondary light 3 metres (9.8 ft) below the main light. The secondary light emits a red light: 2 seconds on and then 2 seconds off. The site is only accessible by boat.

== See also ==
- Lighthouses in Norway
- List of lighthouses in Norway
