= Old Edøy Church =

Church in Møre og Romsdal, Norway

- Edøy gamle kirke
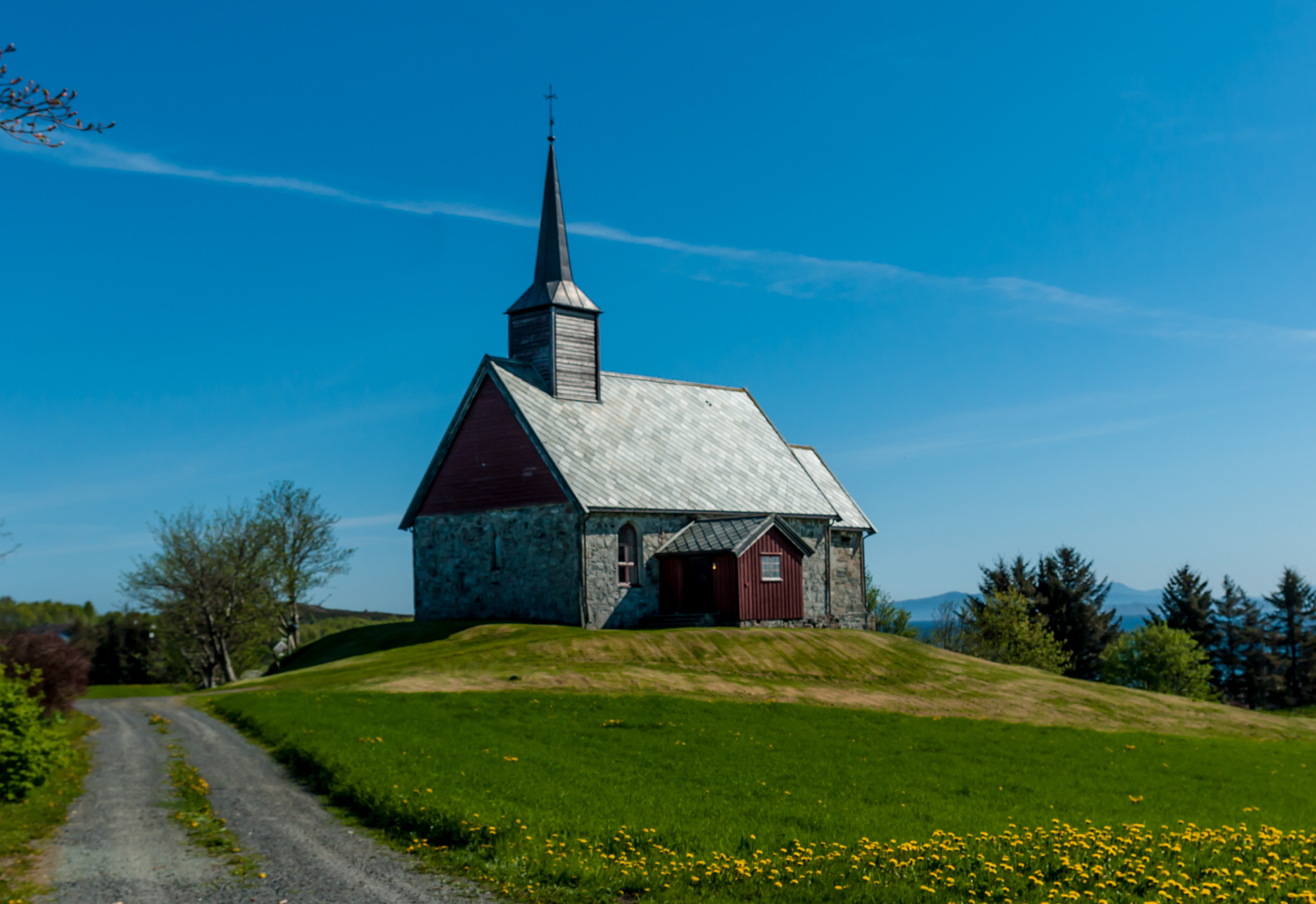
- View of the church
- Old Edøy Church
- 63.285587394°N 8.13144117593°E
- Location: Smøla Municipality, Møre og Romsdal
- Country: Norway
- Denomination: Church of Norway
- Previous denomination: Catholic Church
- Churchmanship: Evangelical Lutheran

History
- Status: Parish church
- Founded: c. 1190
- Consecrated: c. 1190 and 1950

Architecture
- Functional status: Historic
- Architectural type: Long church
- Completed: c. 1190 (836 years ago)

Specifications
- Capacity: 120
- Materials: Stone

Administration
- Diocese: Møre bispedømme
- Deanery: Ytre Nordmøre prosti
- Parish: Edøy
- Norwegian Cultural Heritage Site
- Type: Church
- Status: Automatically protected
- ID: 67361

Old Edøy Church (Norwegian: Edøy gamle kirke) is a historic parish church of the Church of Norway in Smøla Municipality in Møre og Romsdal county, Norway. It is located on the southwestern end of the small island of Edøya, just south of the larger island of Smøla. Prior to the construction of the new Edøy Church in 1885, it was the main church for the Edøy parish which is part of the Ytre Nordmøre prosti (deanery) in the Diocese of Møre. The stone church was built in a long church style around the year 1190 by an unknown architect. The church seats about 120 people.

== History ==
The earliest existing historical records of the church date back to the year 1533, but the church was not new that year. The church in Edøy was first established during the middle of the 12th century. The stone church originally had a rectangular nave that measured about 12.2 by 9.5 metres (40 ft × 31 ft) with a narrower, rectangular chancel measuring about 5.5 by 5.9 metres (18 ft × 19 ft). Interestingly, the chancel is a little crooked in relation to the nave, meaning the north and south walls of the nave are not parallel to the north and south walls of the chancel. Around 1690, the nave was extended several meters to the west to increase the capacity of the church.

In 1814, this church served as an election church (Norwegian: valgkirke). Together with more than 300 other parish churches across Norway, it was a polling station for elections to the 1814 Norwegian Constituent Assembly which wrote the Constitution of Norway. This was Norway's first national elections. Each church parish was a constituency that elected people called "electors" who later met together in each county to elect the representatives for the assembly that was to meet at Eidsvoll Manor later that year.

After several hundred years of use, by the 1880s, the church was too small and old to continue as the main church for the parish, so it was decided to build a new Edøy Church. The new church would be built to the north, on the main island of Smøla instead of the more isolated location of the old church on the small island of Edøya. After the new church was completed in September 1885, the old church was not regularly used anymore except for special occasions. In 1887, the church was struck by lightning which caused a fire which burned and badly damaged the building, leaving the stone walls, but destroying the roof and interior furnishings. The ruins of the old church remained as is until World War II. The occupying Germans used the church ruins as a warehouse. They also constructed an underground bunker under the old chancel. From 1946-1947, the church was rebuilt in a historically accurate manner by the architect John Tverdahl. The old bunker was left as is and the top of the bunker now forms the floor of the chancel. The building was re-consecrated on 4 June 1950 and it is now protected as a historic site.

In 2019, archaeologists from the Norwegian Institute for Cultural Heritage Research using large-scale high-resolution georadar technology, determined that a 17-metre (56 ft) long Viking ship was buried near this church. Traces of a small settlement were also found. They estimate the ship's age as over 1,000 years (from either the Merovingian or Viking periods). The group planned to conduct additional searches in the area. A similar burial was found previously by NIKU archaeologists in 2018, the Gjellestad ship.

== Media gallery ==
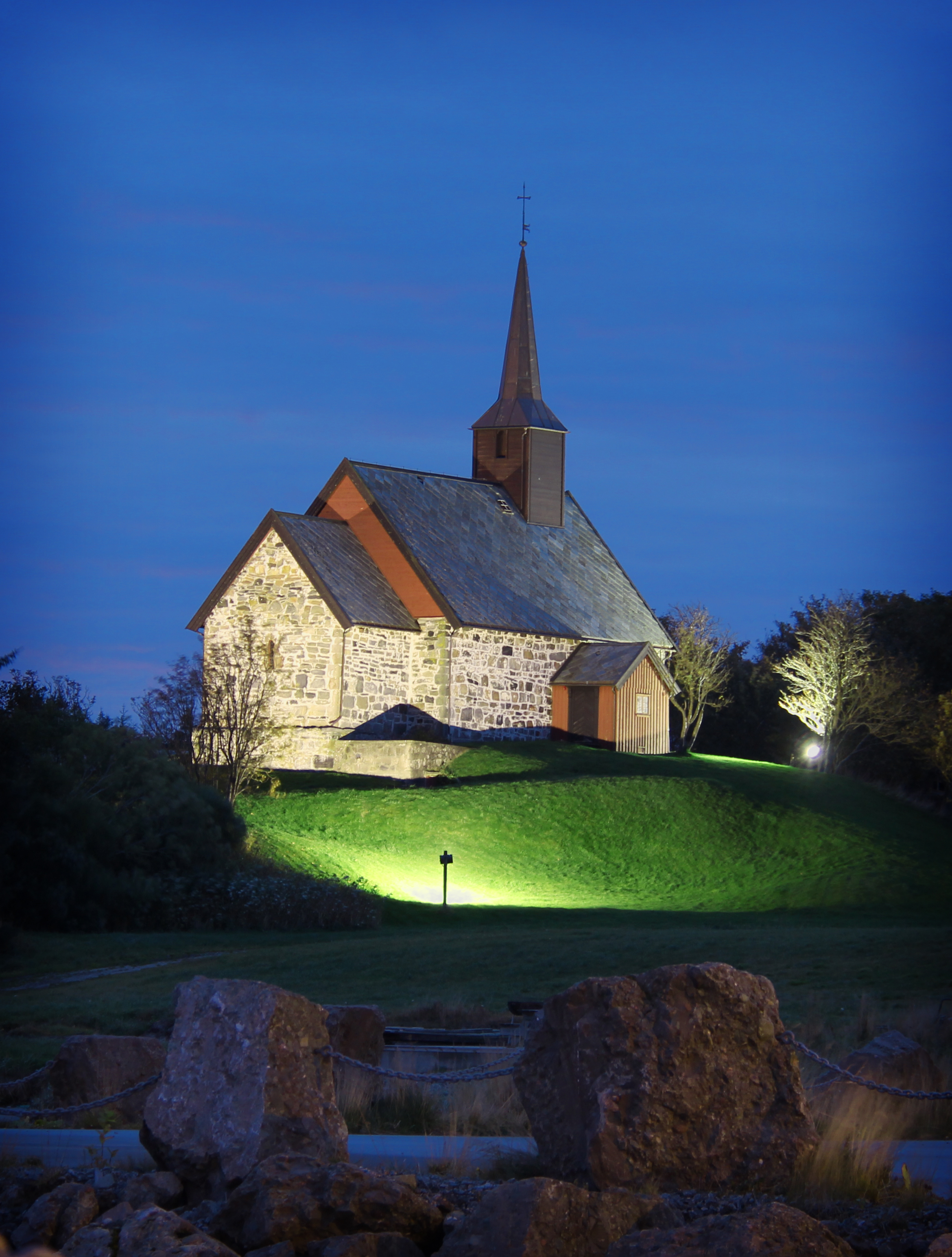

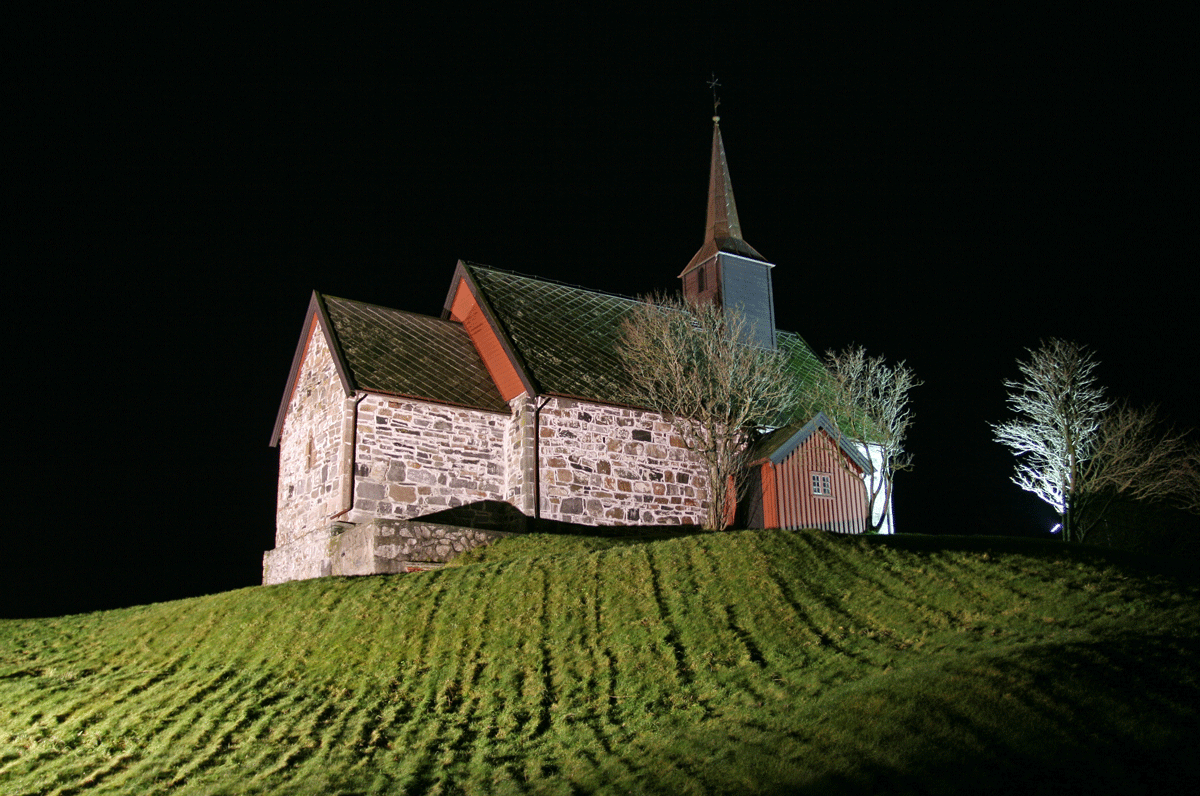

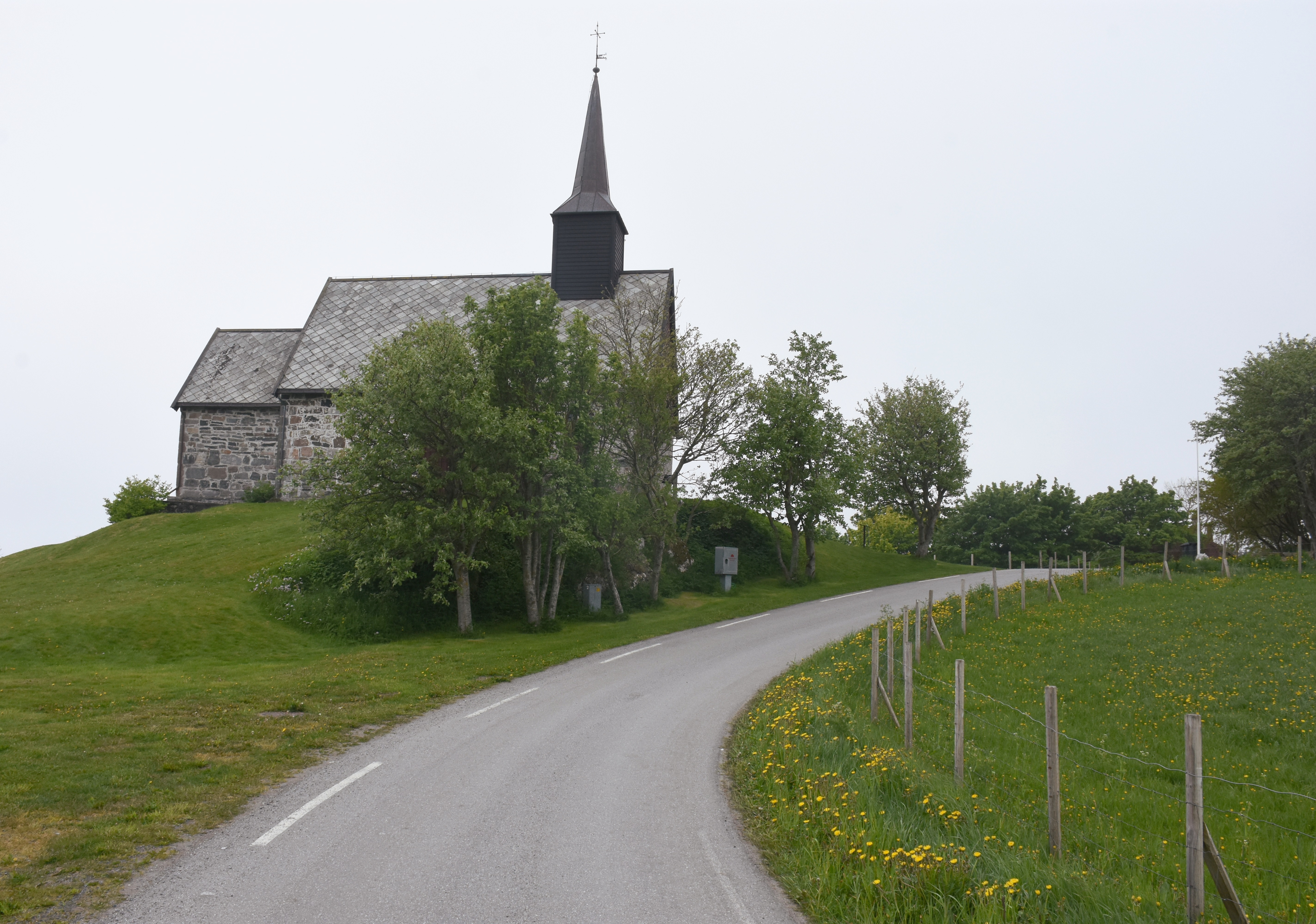

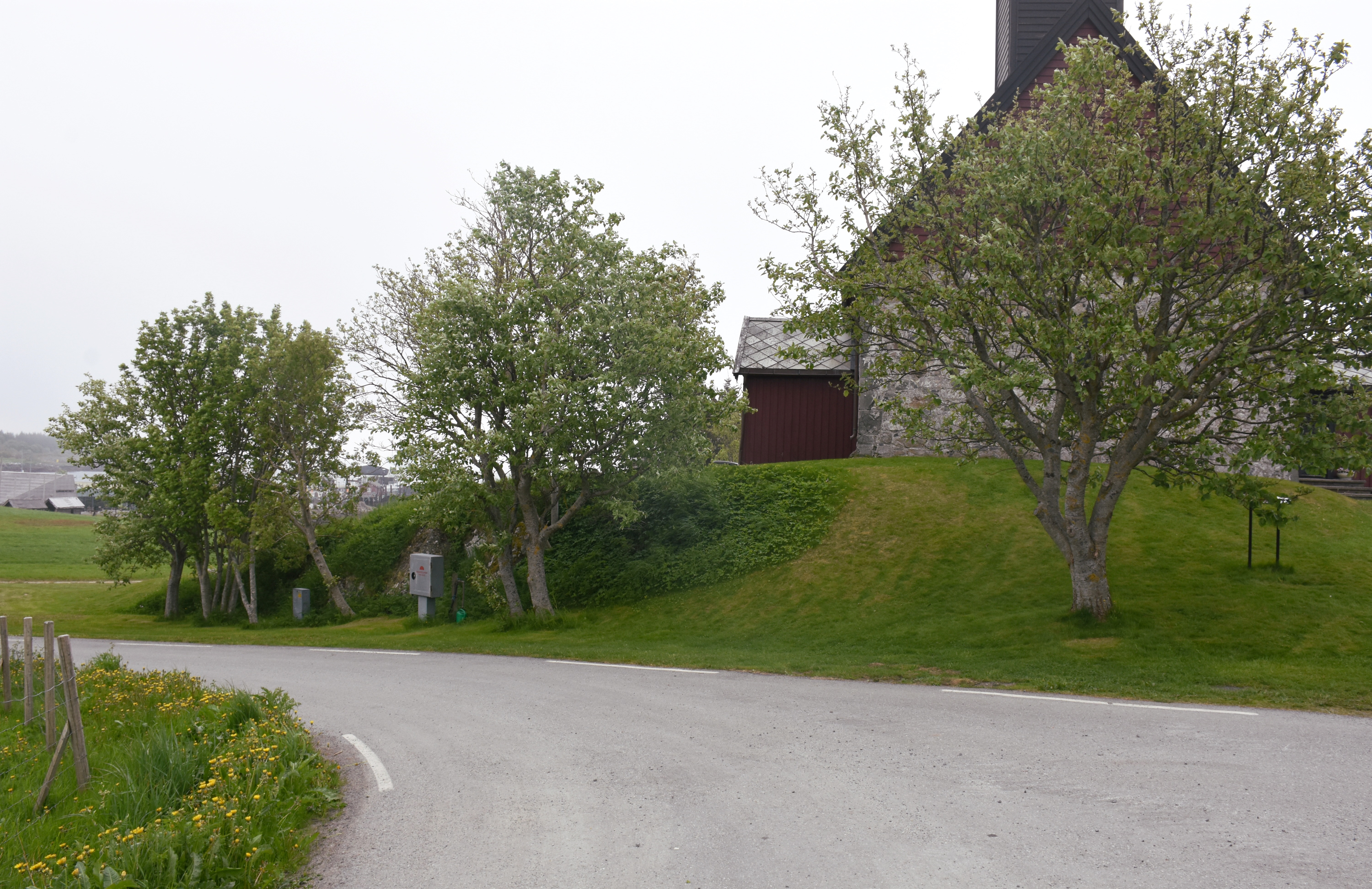

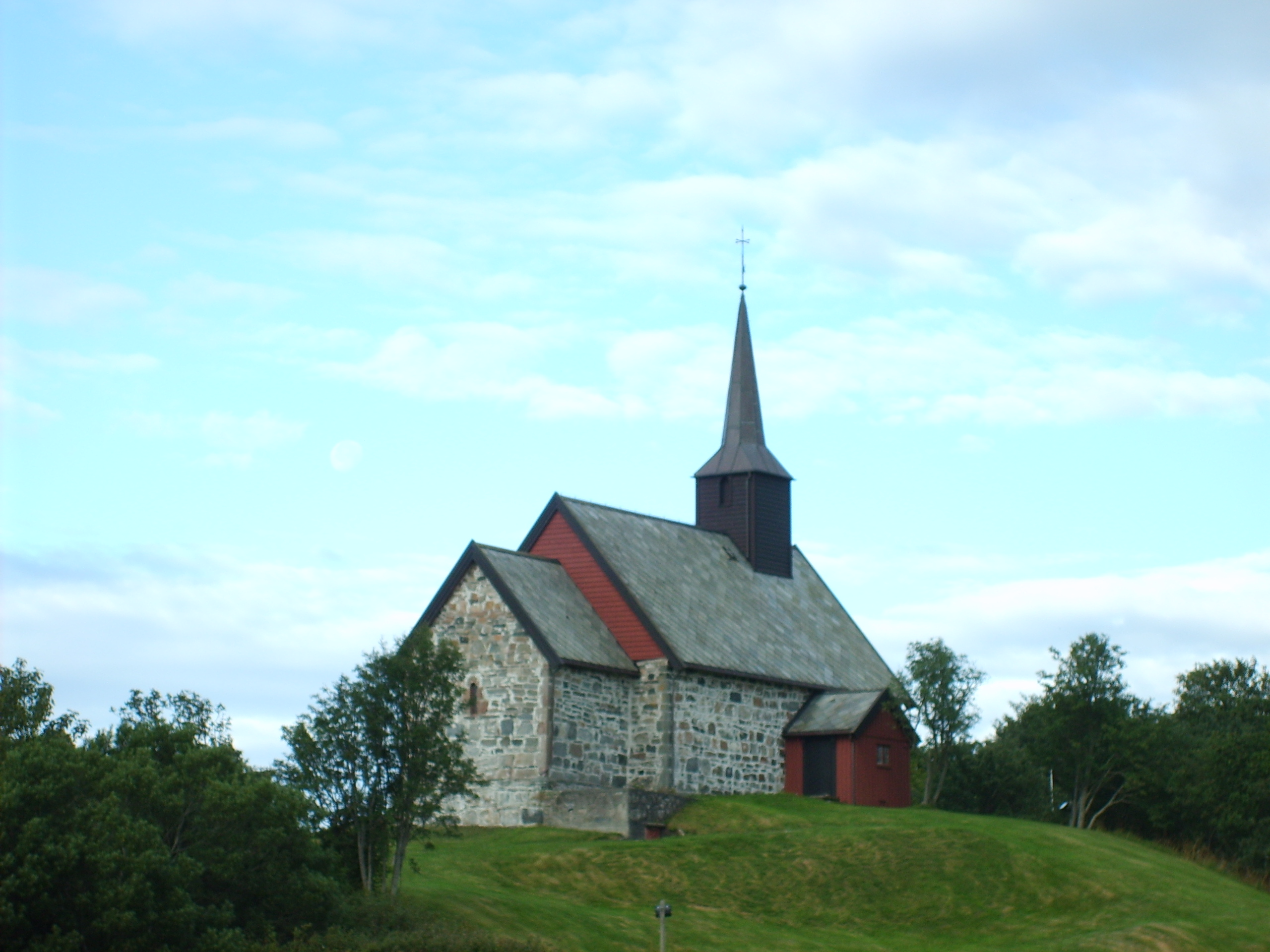

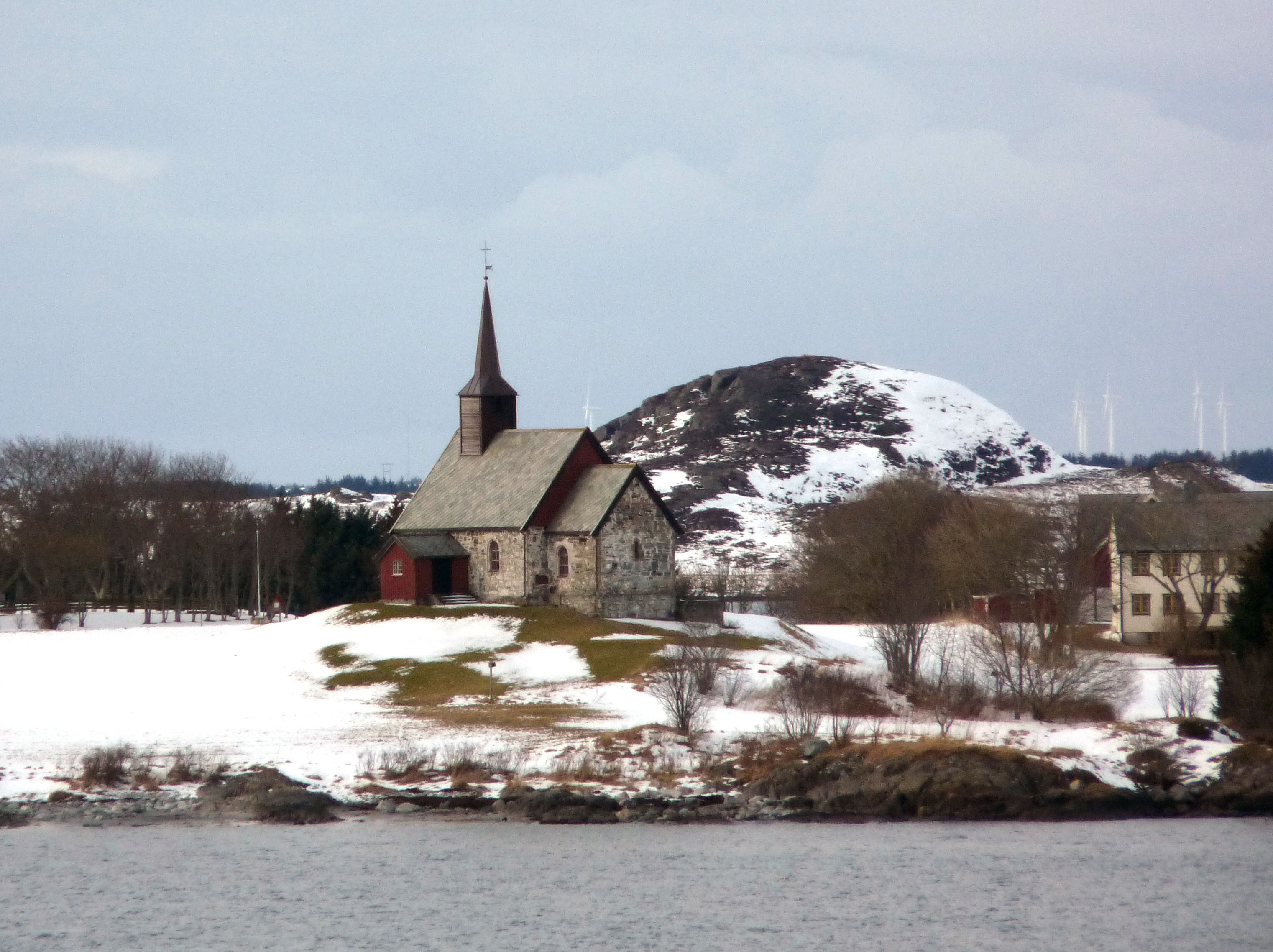

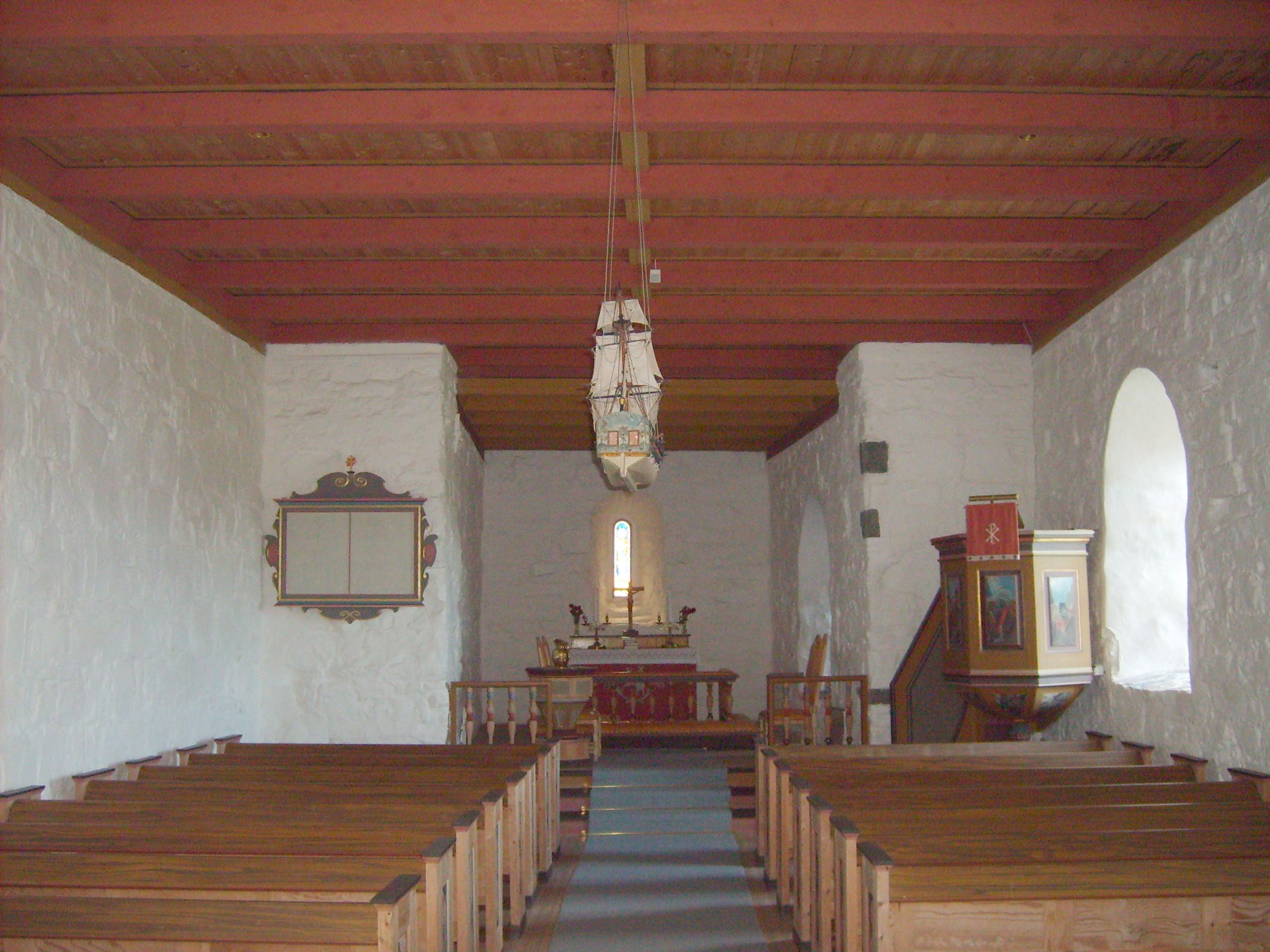

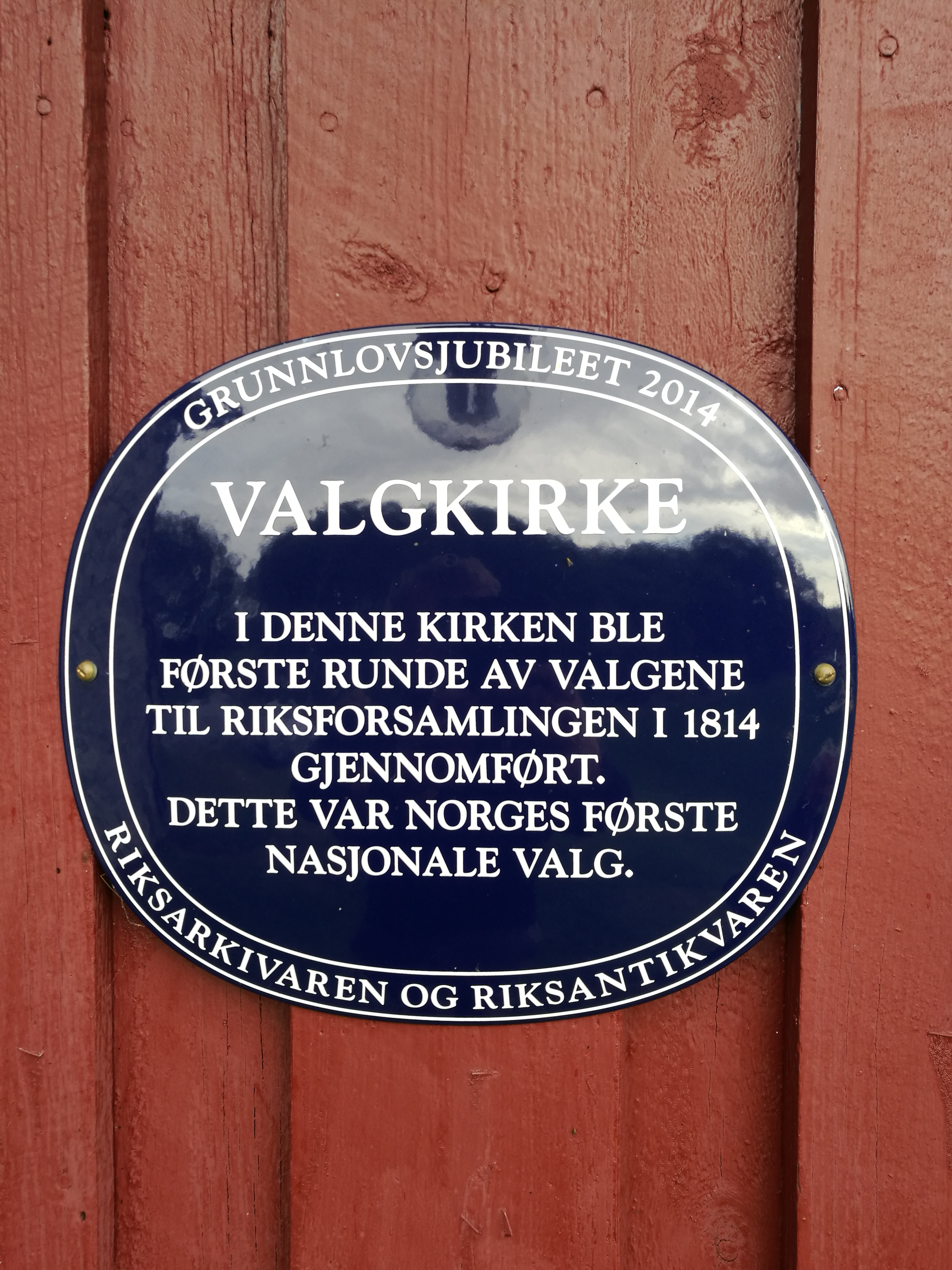

== See also ==
- List of churches in Møre
