= Kulisteinen =

Coordinates: 63.2965°N 8.0878°E

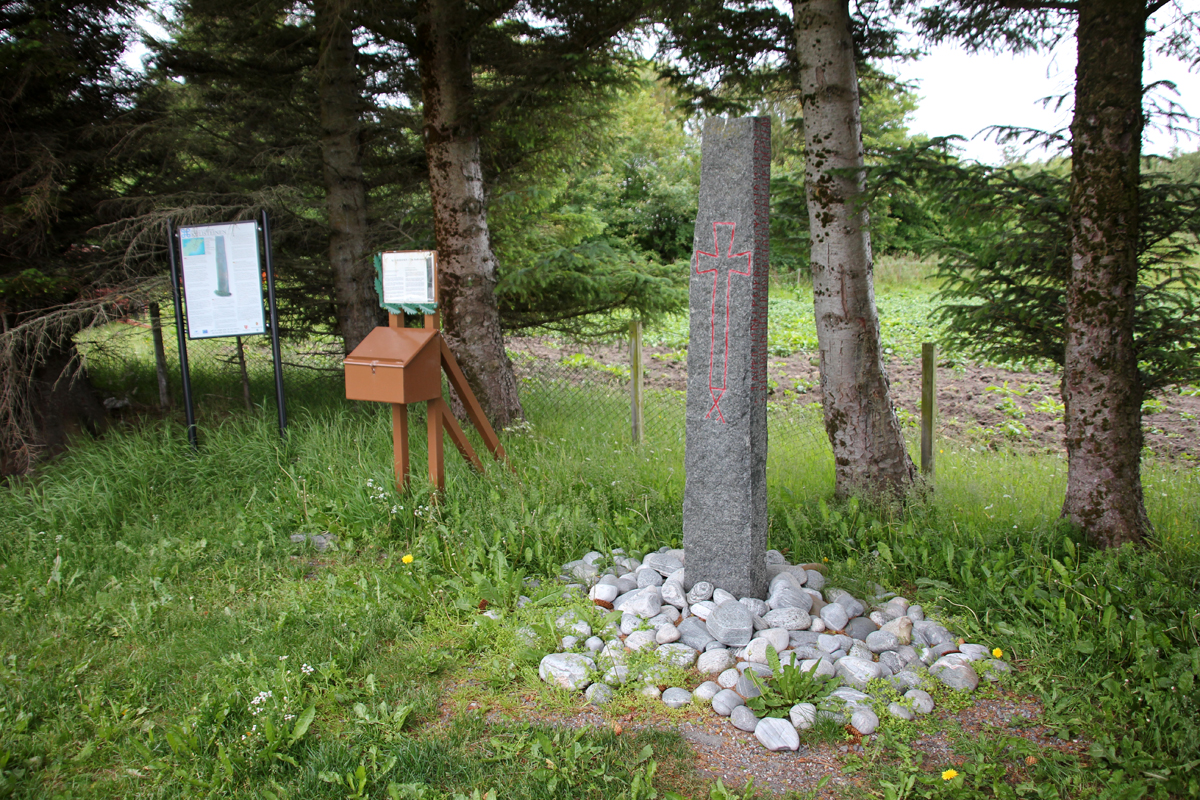
The Kuli stone has a prominent cross.

The Kulisteinen, also known as the Kuli stone and listed as N 449 in the Rundata catalog, is a stone with a runic inscription that was originally located at Kuløy in Smøla Municipality, Norway.

== Description ==
For over 900 years the Kuli stone had been at Kuløy, but then 1913 it was moved to Vitenskapsmuseet i Trondheim. It had a cross on the broad side, indicating that it was a Christian marker. Then in 1956 curator Aslak Liestøl noticed that the stone had a runic inscription along the narrow edge. It reads in Old Norse: "Tore and Hallvard erected this stone ... (for) twelve winters/years Christianity had been in Norway".

In the mid-1990s the inscription was subjected to laser scanning and microcartography in an attempt to arrive at a more sure reading. It was then suggested that the word translated "been" (vært) above should be read as um rétt, and that this could mean that Christianity had "supplied law and order" for twelve years. The runic stone would then have been propaganda for the new religion, Christianity. There are, however, serious paleographic and philological/linguistic problems with the new reading and interpretation.

It was first suggested by Nils Halan that the inscription refers to a national event, the establishment of the law that formally made Christianity the religion of Norway at the Moster Thing in either 1022 or 1024 by King Olaf Haraldsson. The Kuli stone was later dated to 1034 since it was originally found adjacent to a Viking Age boardwalk dated dendrochronologically to that year, on the assumption that the two were contemporaneous. Others have suggested that the inscription refers to the conquest of Norway in 995 by King Olaf Tryggvason and his forced conversions.

The transcription and translation below use that accepted in the Rundata database. The runic text refers to Nóregi, or Norway. One other Viking Age runestone refers to Norway, the larger Jelling Stone DR 42, which was raised by King Harald Bluetooth of Denmark and uses the name Norveg. The Kuli stone also marks the first known use of the word "Christianity" in Norway.

== Inscription ==
þurir : auk : hal(u)arþr : rai(s)(t)(u) · stain : þins(i) · aft u(l)f(l)iu(t) … ¶ tualf · uintr · ha(f)(þ)i : (k)r(i)(s)(t)(i)(n)·(t)umr : (u)iri(t) · (i) n(u)riki …
Þórir {} ok {} Hallvarðr {} reistu {} stein {} þenna {} ept Ulfljót(?) … {} Tolf {} vetr {} hafði {} kristindómr {} verit {} í Nóregi …
Þórir and Hallvarðr raised this stone in memory of Ulfljótr(?) … Christianity had been twelve winters in Norway …

== See also ==
- Christianization of Scandinavia
