= Norges kirker =

Church of Norway building documentation project

Norges kirker is a documentation project for church buildings affiliated with the Church of Norway. The project was initiated by the Norwegian Directorate for Cultural Heritage, and is now affiliated with the Norwegian Institute for Cultural Heritage Research. Results were from the beginning in the 1950s published within the book series Norske Minnesmerker ("Norwegian Heritage Monuments") published by the Norwegian Directorate for Cultural Heritage. Since 2003 the accumulated material has been published online.

== See also ==
- Churches in Norway
