= Hopen Municipality =

Former municipality in Møre og Romsdal, Norway

Hopen Municipality Hopen herred
- Former municipality
- Møre og Romsdal within Norway

- Hopen within Møre og Romsdal
- Coordinates: 63°27′48″N 08°00′50″E
- Country: Norway
- County: Møre og Romsdal
- District: Nordmøre
- Established: 1 Jan 1915
  - Preceded by: Edøy Municipality
- Disestablished: 1 Jan 1960
  - Succeeded by: Smøla Municipality
- Administrative centre: Hopen

Government
  - Mayor (1958–1959): Harald Berg (Ap)

Area (upon dissolution)
  - Total: 50.7 km^{2} (19.6 sq mi)
  - Rank: #625 in Norway
- Highest elevation: 39 m (128 ft)

Population (1959)
  - Total: 1,535
  - Rank: #555 in Norway
  - Density: 30.3/km^{2} (78/sq mi)
  - Change (10 years): ▼ −0.4%
- Demonym: Hopaværing

Official language
  - Norwegian form: Bokmål
- Time zone: UTC+01:00 (CET)
  - Summer (DST): UTC+02:00 (CEST)
- ISO 3166 code: NO-1575

Hopen is a former municipality in Møre og Romsdal county, Norway. The 50-square-kilometre (19 sq mi) municipality existed from 1915 until its dissolution in 1960 when it became part of Smøla Municipality. It included the northeastern part of the island of Smøla, plus the small islands to the north such as Veiholmen, Hammarøya, and Haugøya. The administrative centre of the municipality was the village of Hopen where the Hopen Church is located.

Prior to its dissolution in 1960, the 50.7-square-kilometre (19.6 sq mi) municipality was the 625th largest by area out of the 743 municipalities in Norway. Hopen Municipality was the 555th most populous municipality in Norway with a population of about 1,535. The municipality's population density was 30.3 inhabitants per square kilometre (78/sq mi) and its population had decreased by 0.4% over the previous 5-year period.

== General information ==
The municipality of Hopen was established on 1 January 1915 when the large Edøy Municipality was split into three to form: Edøy Municipality (population: 973) in the south, Hopen Municipality (population: 1,050) in the northeast, and Brattvær Municipality (population: 1,452) in the northwest.

During the 1960s, there were many municipal mergers across Norway due to the work of the Schei Committee. On 1 January 1960, the 1915 partition was reversed, merging Brattvær Municipality (population: 1,361), Edøy Municipality (population: 1,135), and Hopen Municipality (population: 1,550), creating the new Smøla Municipality.

=== Name ===
The municipality is named after the old Hopen farm (Old Norse: Hópr) since the first Hopen Church was built there. The name comes from the word hópr which means "a small mostly enclosed bay", likely referring to a bay between two the main island of Smøla and the small island of Hopaøya.

=== Churches ===
The Church of Norway had one parish (sokn) within Hopen Municipality. At the time of the municipal dissolution, it was part of the Edøy prestegjeld and the Nordmøre prosti (deanery) in the Diocese of Nidaros.

Churches in Hopen Municipality
Parish (sokn)	Church name	Location of the church	Year built
Hopen	Hopen Church	Hopen	1892

== Geography ==
The municipality was located on the northeastern part of the large island of Smøla, along with the surrounding smaller islets and skerries. Brattvær Municipality was located to the south and Edøy Municipality was located to the south. The highest point in the municipality was the 39-metre (128 ft) tall Moldstadhøgda.

== Government ==
While it existed, Hopen Municipality was responsible for primary education (through 10th grade), outpatient health services, senior citizen services, welfare and other social services, zoning, economic development, and municipal roads and utilities. The municipality was governed by a municipal council of directly elected representatives. The mayor was indirectly elected by a vote of the municipal council. The municipality was under the jurisdiction of the Frostating Court of Appeal.

=== Municipal council ===
The municipal council (Heradsstyre) of Hopen Municipality was made up of 17 representatives that were elected to four-year terms. The tables below show the historical composition of the council by political party.

Hopen herredsstyre 1955–1959
Party name (in Norwegian)	Number of representatives
Labour Party (Arbeiderpartiet)	10
Christian Democratic Party (Kristelig Folkeparti)	5
Joint List(s) of Non-Socialist Parties (Borgerlige Felleslister)	2
Total number of members:	17
Note: On 1 January 1960, Hopen Municipality became part of Smøla Municipality.

Hopen herredsstyre 1951–1955
Party name (in Norwegian)	Number of representatives
Local List(s) (Lokale lister)	16
Total number of members:	16

Hopen herredsstyre 1947–1951
Party name (in Norwegian)	Number of representatives
Local List(s) (Lokale lister)	16
Total number of members:	16

Hopen herredsstyre 1945–1947
Party name (in Norwegian)	Number of representatives
Labour Party (Arbeiderpartiet)	7
Christian Democratic Party (Kristelig Folkeparti)	6
Local List(s) (Lokale lister)	3
Total number of members:	16

Hopen herredsstyre 1937–1941*
Party name (in Norwegian)	Number of representatives
Labour Party (Arbeiderpartiet)	9
List of workers, fishermen, and small farmholders (Arbeidere, fiskere, småbrukere liste)	2
Joint List(s) of Non-Socialist Parties (Borgerlige Felleslister)	5
Total number of members:	16
Note: Due to the German occupation of Norway during World War II, no elections were held for new municipal councils until after the war ended in 1945.

=== Mayors ===
The mayor (Norwegian: ordfører) of Hopen Municipality was the political leader of the municipality and the chairperson of the municipal council. The following people have held this position:

- 1915–1919: Bastian Width
- 1920–1922: John Wullum
- 1923–1927: Bastian Width
- 1928–1931: John Wullum
- 1931–1934: Johan Rokstad
- 1934–1941: Johannes Kristian Bjøringsøy
- 1945–1945: Isak Isaksen
- 1946–1946: Bastian Width
- 1946–1947: Arthur Rosvoll
- 1948–1958: Jakob Rokstad (Ap)
- 1958–1959: Harald Berg (Ap)

== See also ==
- List of former municipalities of Norway
