= Smøla Wind Farm =

Wind farm in Norway

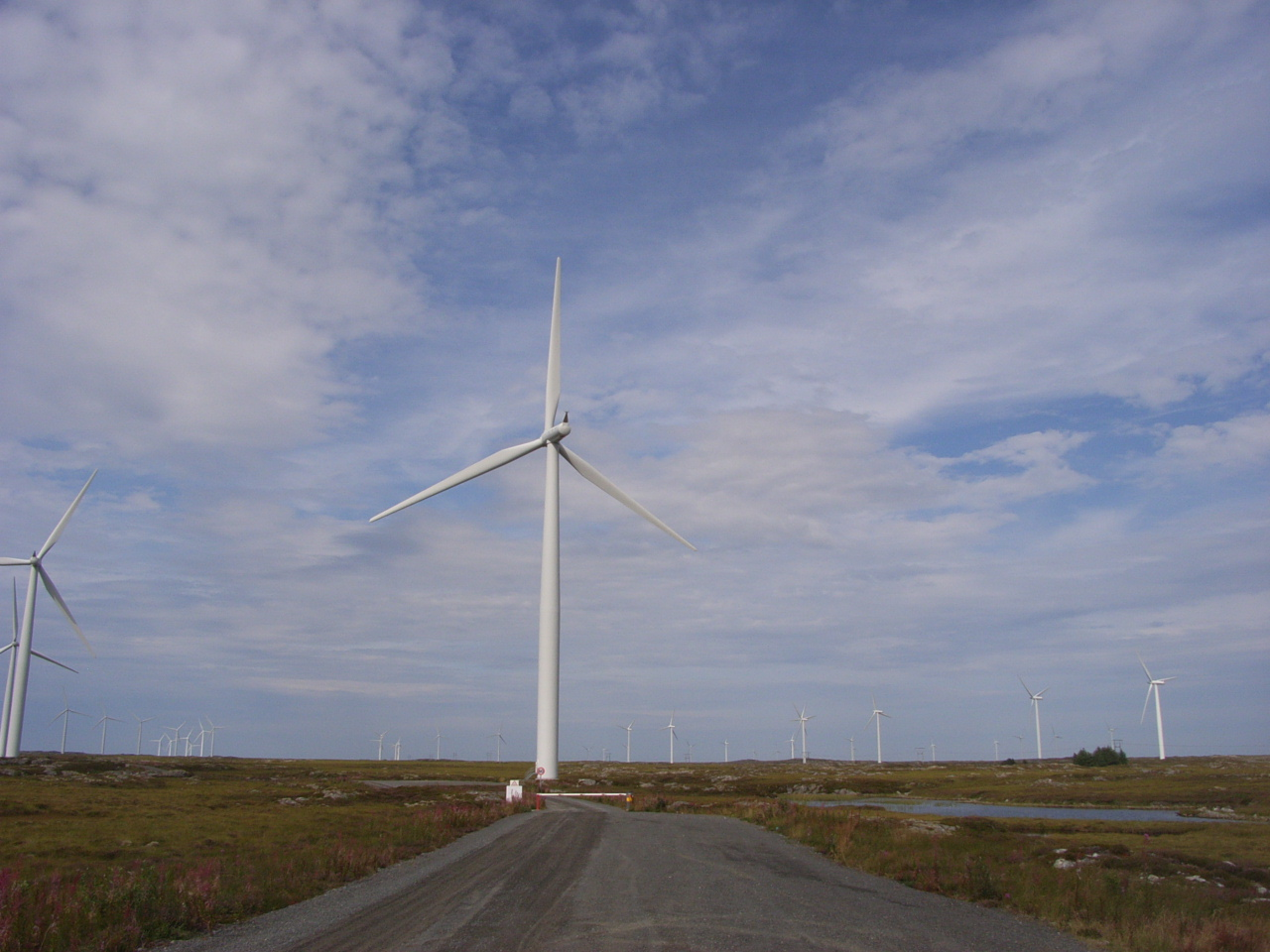
- Country: Norway
- Location: Smøla Municipality
- Coordinates: 63°24.42′N 7°55.44′E
- Status: Operational
- Commission date: September 5, 2002
- Owner: Statkraft
- Site area: 18 km^{2}

Power generation
- Units operational: 68
- Nameplate capacity: 150 MW
- Capacity factor: 34.2%
- Annual net output: 450 GW·h

External links
- Commons: Related media on Commons

Smøla Wind Farm (Smøla vindpark) is a 68-turbine wind farm located in Smøla Municipality in Møre og Romsdal county, Norway. The farm is located southeast of the village of Dyrnes on the island of Smøla. It is operated by Statkraft and covers an area of 18 square kilometres (6.9 sq mi).

Total installed effect is 20 x 2.0 MW (phase one) plus 48 x 2.3 MW (phase two). The maximum production capacity is 150 MW and total generating capacity is in average 450 GWh per year, making Smøla one of the largest wind farms in the country.

The first stage was opened by King Harald V of Norway on 5 September 2002. Phase two opened in September 2005.

In 2020, the Smøla Wind Farm was the site of an experiment that showed that painting one blade of a wind turbine a darker color reduces bird deaths by 70%, which could help reduce concerns about bird deaths from wind turbines.
