= Brattvær Municipality =

Former municipality in Møre og Romsdal, Norway

Brattvær Municipality Brattvær herred
- Former municipality
- Bratvær herred (historic name)
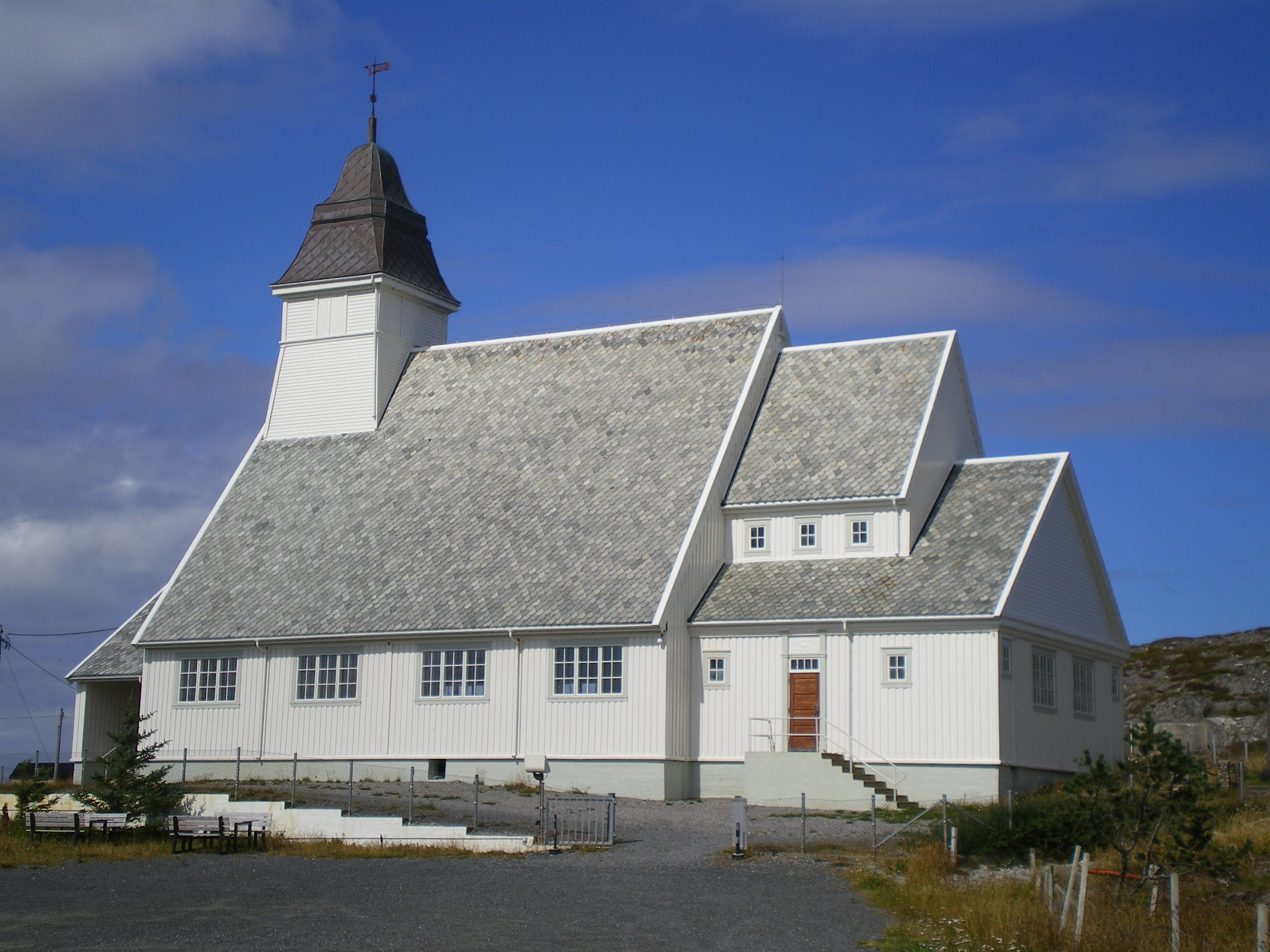
- View of the local church

- Møre og Romsdal within Norway

- Brattvær within Møre og Romsdal
- Coordinates: 63°24′23″N 07°48′19″E
- Country: Norway
- County: Møre og Romsdal
- District: Nordmøre
- Established: 1 Jan 1915
  - Preceded by: Edøy Municipality
- Disestablished: 1 Jan 1960
  - Succeeded by: Smøla Municipality

Government
  - Mayor (1952-1959): Harald Dønheim (Ap)

Area (upon dissolution)
  - Total: 72.7 km^{2} (28.1 sq mi)
  - Rank: #582 in Norway
- Highest elevation: 48 m (157 ft)

Population (1959)
  - Total: 1,371
  - Rank: #582 in Norway
  - Density: 18.9/km^{2} (49/sq mi)
  - Change (10 years): ▼ −5.3%
- Demonym: Brattværing

Official language
  - Norwegian form: Neutral
- Time zone: UTC+01:00 (CET)
  - Summer (DST): UTC+02:00 (CEST)
- ISO 3166 code: NO-1574

Brattvær is a former municipality in Møre og Romsdal county, Norway. The 73-square-kilometre (28 sq mi) municipality existed from 1915 until its dissolution in 1960. It was located on the northwestern part of the island of Smøla in the present-day Smøla Municipality. It included the area surrounding the villages of Råket and Dyrnes as well Brattværet and the surrounding islets. The Brattvær Church was the main church of the municipality.

Prior to its dissolution in 1960, the 72.7-square-kilometre (28.1 sq mi) municipality was the 582nd largest by area out of the 743 municipalities in Norway. Brattvær Municipality was the 582nd most populous municipality in Norway with a population of about 1,371. The municipality's population density was 18.9 inhabitants per square kilometre (49/sq mi) and its population had decreased by 5.3% over the previous 5-year period.

== General information ==
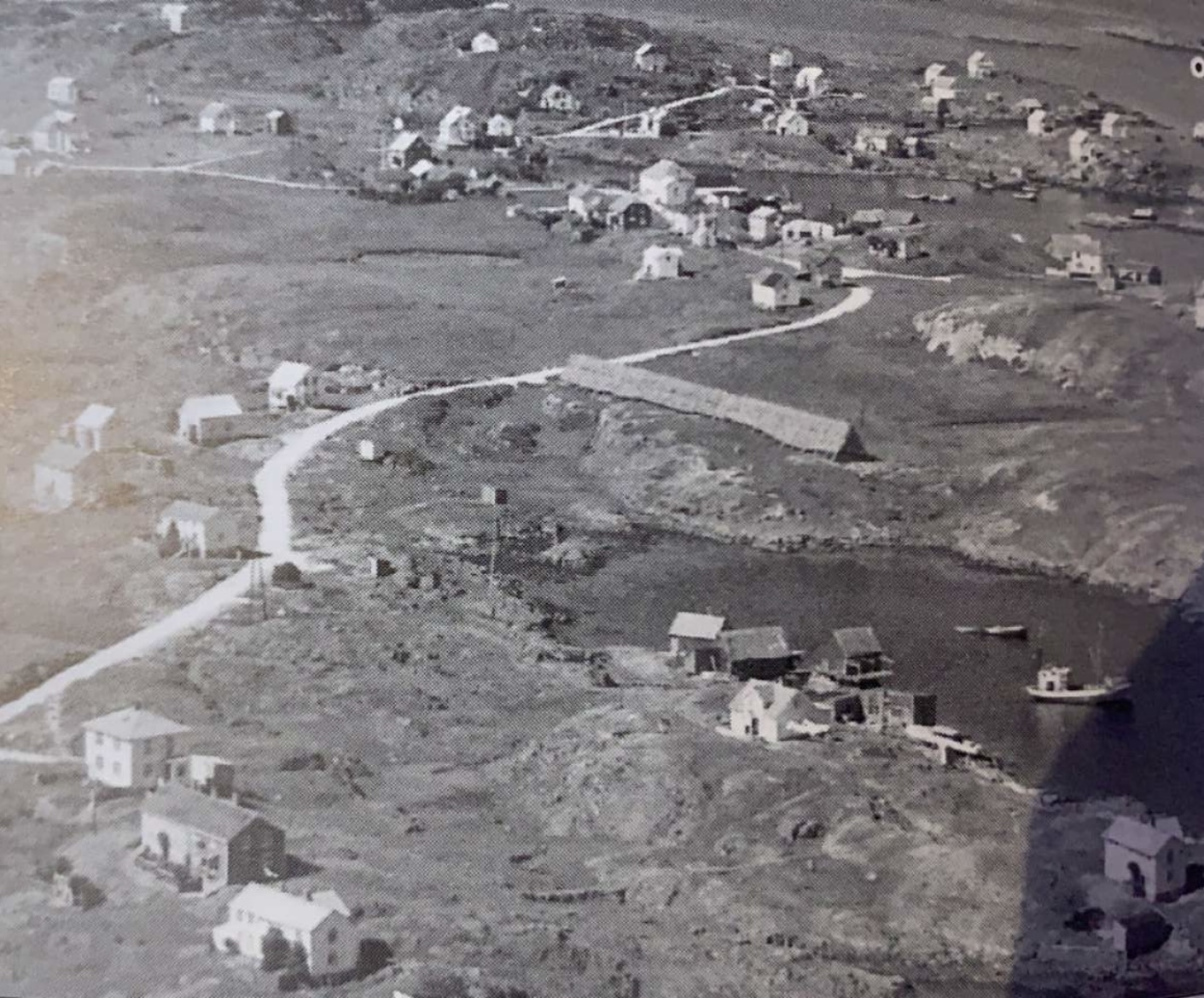
Historic view of Råket

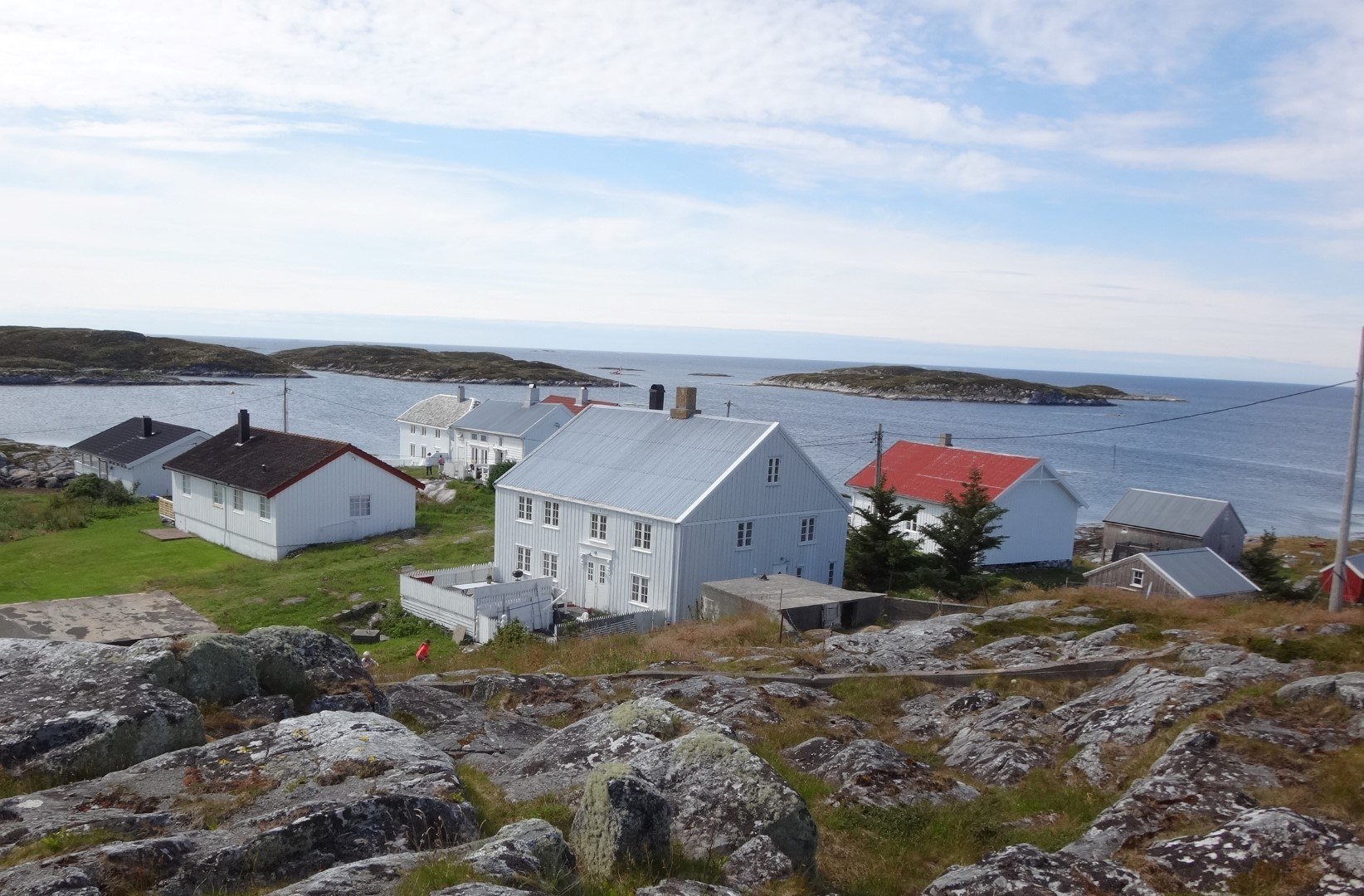
View of Brattværet

The municipality of Brattvær was established on 1 January 1915 when the large Edøy Municipality was split into three to form: Edøy Municipality (population: 973) in the south, Hopen Municipality (population: 1,050) in the northeast, and Brattvær Municipality (population: 1,452) in the northwest.

During the 1960s, there were many municipal mergers across Norway due to the work of the Schei Committee. On 1 January 1960, the 1915 partition was reversed, merging Brattvær Municipality (population: 1,361), Edøy Municipality (population: 1,135), and Hopen Municipality (population: 1,550), creating the new Smøla Municipality.

=== Name ===
The municipality (originally the parish) is named after the old Brattvær farm (Old Norse: Brattver) since the first Brattvær Church was built there. The first element comes from the word bratt which means "steep". The last element is ver which means "fishing village". Historically, the name of the municipality was spelled Bratvær. On 22 April 1938, a royal resolution changed the spelling of the name of the municipality to Brattvær effective 1 July 1938.

=== Churches ===
The Church of Norway had one parish (sokn) within Brattvær Municipality. At the time of the municipal dissolution, it was part of the Edøy prestegjeld and the Nordmøre prosti (deanery) in the Diocese of Nidaros.

Churches in Brattvær Municipality
| Parish (sokn) | Church name | Location of the church | Year built |
|---|---|---|---|
| Brattvær | Brattvær Church | south of Råket | 1917 |

== Geography ==
The municipality was located on the northwestern part of the large island of Smøla, along with the surrounding smaller islets and skerries including Brattværet. Edøy Municipality was located to the south and Hopen Municipality was located to the east. The highest point in the municipality was the 49-metre (161 ft) tall mountain Haukarhaugan.

== Government ==
While it existed, Brattvær Municipality was responsible for primary education (through 10th grade), outpatient health services, senior citizen services, welfare and other social services, zoning, economic development, and municipal roads and utilities. The municipality was governed by a municipal council of directly elected representatives. The mayor was indirectly elected by a vote of the municipal council. The municipality was under the jurisdiction of the Frostating Court of Appeal.

=== Municipal council ===
The municipal council (Herredsstyre) of Brattvær Municipality was made up of 17 representatives that were elected to four year terms. The tables below show the historical composition of the council by political party.

Brattvær herredsstyre 1955–1959
| Party name (in Norwegian) | Number of representatives |
|---|---|
| Labour Party (Arbeiderpartiet) | 8 |
| Christian Democratic Party (Kristelig Folkeparti) | 4 |
| Joint List(s) of Non-Socialist Parties (Borgerlige Felleslister) | 5 |
| Total number of members: | 17 |
Note: On 1 January 1960, Brattvær Municipality became part of Smøla Municipality.

Brattvær herredsstyre 1951–1955
| Party name (in Norwegian) | Number of representatives |
|---|---|
| Labour Party (Arbeiderpartiet) | 8 |
| Christian Democratic Party (Kristelig Folkeparti) | 4 |
| Joint List(s) of Non-Socialist Parties (Borgerlige Felleslister) | 4 |
| Total number of members: | 16 |

Brattvær herredsstyre 1947–1951
| Party name (in Norwegian) | Number of representatives |
|---|---|
| Labour Party (Arbeiderpartiet) | 6 |
| Communist Party (Kommunistiske Parti) | 1 |
| Christian Democratic Party (Kristelig Folkeparti) | 6 |
| Joint List(s) of Non-Socialist Parties (Borgerlige Felleslister) | 3 |
| Total number of members: | 16 |

Brattvær herredsstyre 1945–1947
| Party name (in Norwegian) | Number of representatives |
|---|---|
| Labour Party (Arbeiderpartiet) | 8 |
| Christian Democratic Party (Kristelig Folkeparti) | 5 |
| List of workers, fishermen, and small farmholders (Arbeidere, fiskere, småbrukere liste) | 3 |
| Total number of members: | 16 |

Brattvær herredsstyre 1937–1941*
| Party name (in Norwegian) | Number of representatives |
|---|---|
| Labour Party (Arbeiderpartiet) | 10 |
| Joint list of the Liberal Party, small farm-holders, and fishermen (Venstre, Småbrukere og Fiskere) | 4 |
| Joint List(s) of Non-Socialist Parties (Borgerlige Felleslister) | 2 |
| Total number of members: | 16 |
Note: Due to the German occupation of Norway during World War II, no elections were held for new municipal councils until after the war ended in 1945.

=== Mayors ===
The mayor (Norwegian: ordfører) of Brattvær Municipality was the political leader of the municipality and the chairperson of the municipal council. The following people have held this position:

- 1915–1919: Per M. Skartnes
- 1920–1922: L. Taknæs
- 1922–1931: A. Talleraas
- 1931–1941: Hermann Frost Meese
- 1945–1945: Hermann Frost Meese
- 1946–1946: Ivar Hestnes
- 1946–1951: John Grimsmo
- 1952–1959: Harald Dønheim (Ap)

== See also ==
- List of former municipalities of Norway
