= Ingar Knudtsen =

Norwegian novelist and poet (1944–2025)

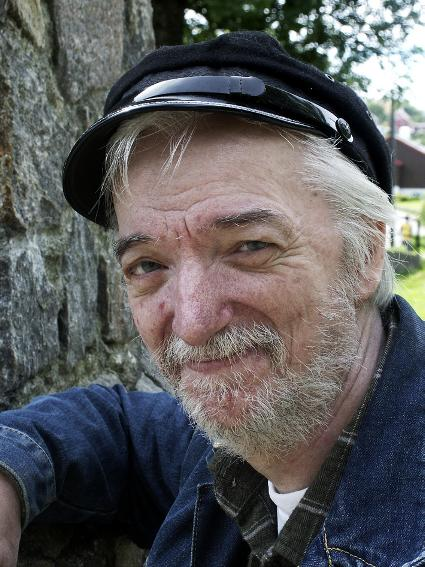
- Born: 23 December 1944; Smøla, German-occupied Norway
- Died: 24 October 2025 (aged 80)
- Occupation: Writer; poet; novelist
- Years active: 1975–2008
- Style: Scifi; realism; fantasy

Ingar Knudtsen (23 December 1944 – 24 October 2025) was a Norwegian novelist and poet. His first book was published in 1975. He subsequently released roughly one book every year until 2008. Only a few of his works have been translated into English. Ingar Knudtsen lived in Kristiansund. He died on 24 October 2025, at the age of 80.

== Bibliography ==
- Ensomheten er en sang. 2008
- Nekromantiker. 2004
- Rød storm. 2003
- Gudinnas døtre. 2002
- Amasoner. 2001
- Mannen med steinhodet. 1999
- I flaggets fold. 1998
- Ansiktet mot sola. 1997
- Natt uten navn. 1996
- Genfærdet. 1995
- For at jeg kan ete deg. 1995
- Havheksen. 1993
- Skumringslandet. 1993
- Nord for Saigon. 1992
- Kalis sang. 1991
- Løvinnens sjel. 1990
- Røde måne. 1989
- Våpensøstrene. 1987
- Tryllekunst. 1987
- Pandoras planet. 1986
- Katteliv. 1985
- Operasjon ares. 1984
- Reisen til jorda. 1981
- Tova. 1979
- Tyrannosaurus rex. 1978
- Lasersesongen. 1977
- Jernringen. 1976
- Under ulvemånen. 1975
- Dimensjon S. 1975
