= Iver G. Nordseth =

Norwegian politician (born 1951)

Iver Gunnar Nordseth (born 2 May 1951) is a Norwegian politician for the Liberal Party.

He served as a deputy representative to the Norwegian Parliament from Møre og Romsdal during the terms 1997–2001 and 2005–2009.

On the local level he was elected mayor of Smøla Municipality in 1991. Since 2003 he is also a member of Møre og Romsdal county council.
