= Edøya =

Island in Nordmøre, Norway

- Interactive map of Edøya

Geography
- Location: Møre og Romsdal, Norway
- Coordinates: 63.2973°N 8.1536°E
- Archipelago: Smøla
- Area: 7.5 km^{2} (2.9 sq mi)
- Length: 7.5 km (4.66 mi)
- Width: 1.5 km (0.93 mi)
- Highest elevation: 41 m (135 ft)
- Highest point: Storvarden

Administration
- Norway
- County: Møre og Romsdal
- Municipality: Smøla Municipality

Edøya is an island in Smøla Municipality in Møre og Romsdal county, Norway. The 7.5-square-kilometre (2.9 sq mi) island lies in the Edøyfjorden between the larger islands of Smøla (to the north) and Ertvågsøya and Tustna (to the south). The island played an important political role during the Viking Age. More recently, it was the center of the old Edøy Municipality and the historic Old Edøy Church is located on the island.

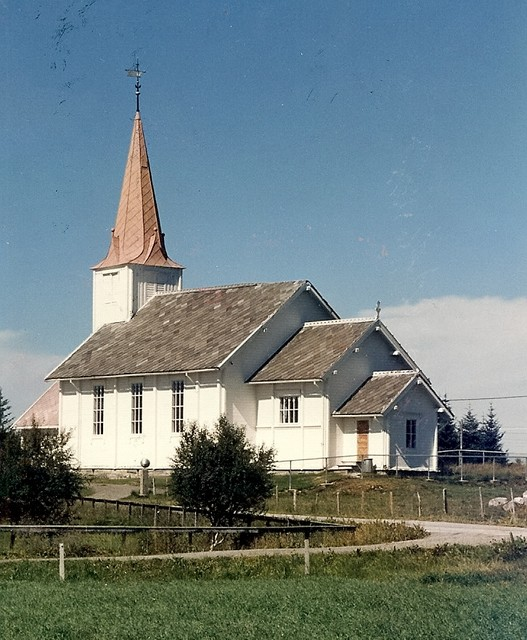
Edøy Church

In 2019, archaeologists from the Norwegian Institute for Cultural Heritage Research, using large-scale high-resolution georadar technology, determined that a 17-metre (56 ft) long Viking ship was buried near Edøy Church. They estimate the ship's age as over 1,000 years: from the Merovingian or Viking period; the group planned to conduct additional searches in the area. A similar burial was found previously by a NIKU team in 2018, in Gjellestad.

The island has a road connection to the island of Smøla and there is a ferry connection from Edøya to Tustna to the south. This is the only regular ferry connection in all of Smøla Municipality, connecting it to the rest of Norway. The Tyrhaug Lighthouse is located on a tiny islet off the coast of Edøya in the Edøyfjorden.

== See also ==
- List of islands of Norway
