= Norwegian Institute for Cultural Heritage Research =

Norwegian research institute

The Norwegian Institute for Cultural Heritage Research (Norwegian: Norsk institutt for kulturminneforskning, NIKU) is a cultural heritage research institute based in Oslo, Norway.

== Organization ==
The institute has nearly 80 employees and regional offices in Bergen, Trondheim, Tønsberg and Tromsø. It consists of six research departments:

- Archaeological Excavations
- Digital Documentation
- Conservation
- Buildings
- Heritage and Society
- High North

The chair is Torger Ødegaard and the deputy chair is Mette Bye The current director general is Kristin Bakken.

NIKU was created in 1994 as a split from the Norwegian Directorate for Cultural Heritage. From 1994 to 2003, the institute shared a board of directors with the Norwegian Institute for Nature Research under the moniker NINA•NIKU.

In 2019, archaeologists from NIKU, using large-scale high-resolution georadar technology, determined that a 17-meter-long Viking ship was buried beside Edøy Church on the island of Edøya. Traces of a small settlement were also found. NIKU estimates the ship's age as over 1,000 years: from the Merovingian or Viking Age. The group plans to conduct additional searches in the area. A similar buried ship was found previously by a NIKU group in 2018, in Gjellestad.

== Gjellestad ship burial ==
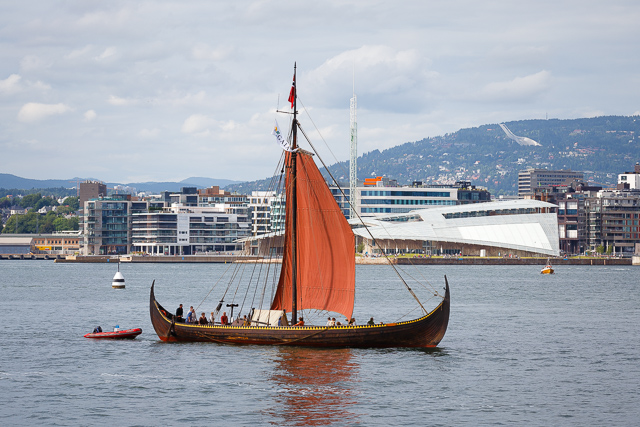
Replica longship similar in size and appearance to the Gjellestad Ship.

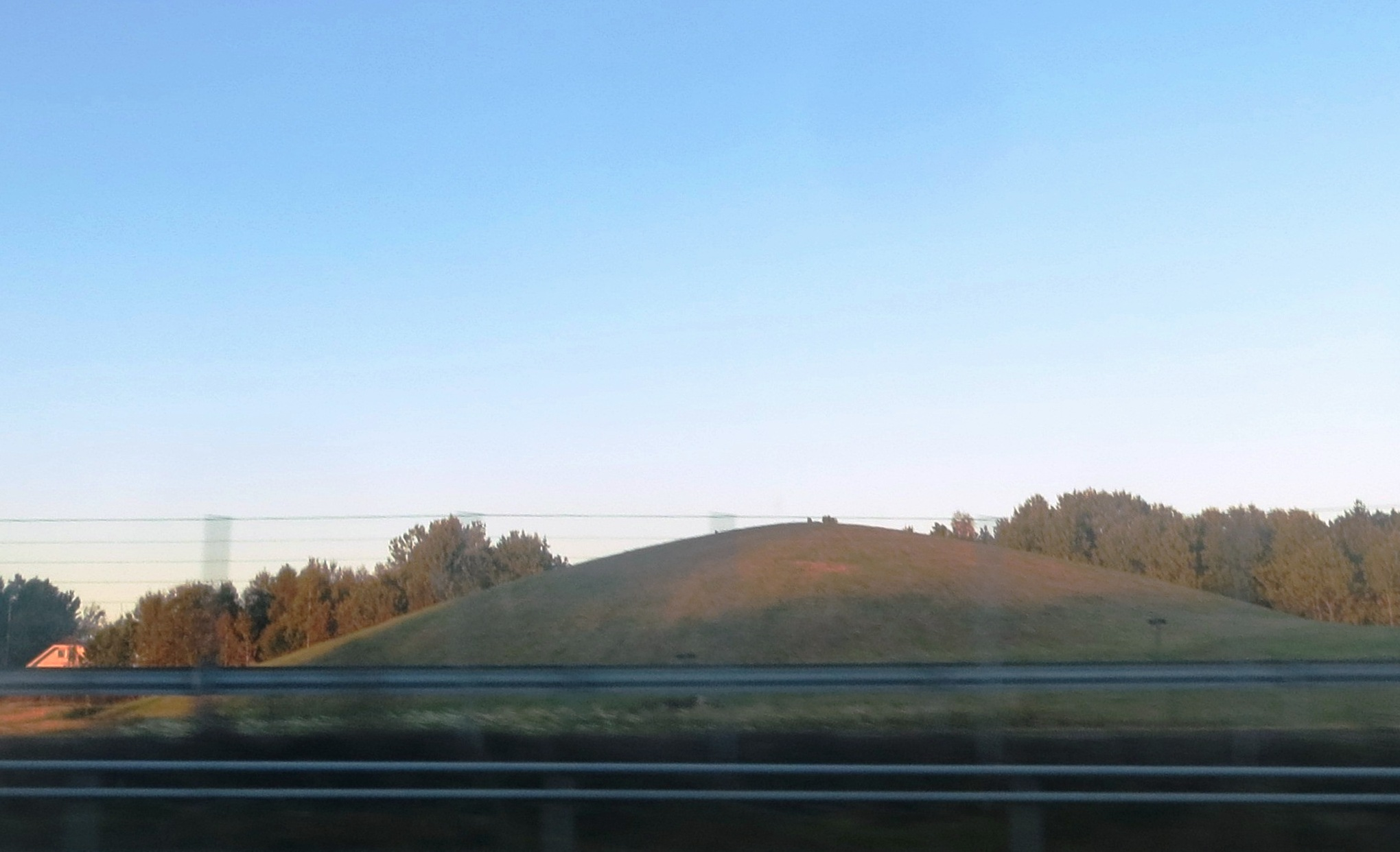
A Viking burial mound at Gjellestad. The Jellhaugen Mound was probably built in the 6th century, about 300 years before the burial of the Gjellestad ship.

The Gjellestad (Norwegian pronunciation: [ˈjɛ̂lːəˌstɑː]) ship burial, also spelt Jellestad, is the remains of a Viking Age longship found at the farm of Gjellestad in Halden municipality in Norway in 2018 by the archeologists Lars Gustavsen and Erich Nau. An ancient well-preserved Viking cemetery for more than 1000 years was discovered using ground-penetrating radar. Archaeologists also revealed at least seven other previously unknown burial mounds and the remnants of five longhouses with the help of the radar survey. The discovery of extensive Bronze Age remains at Gjellestad has led archaeologists to speculate that it had been a sacred site for centuries before the Viking Age.

A 2019 examination by the University of Oslo has dated it to AD 733, at the earliest. Originally interred beneath a burial mound, in the present day the ship lies 50 centimetres below the topsoil due to years of plowing.

Due to extensive fungus damage to the hull caused by field drainage, drought and exposure to the air, archaeologists called for an immediate dig to save the ship. Excavation of the ship at Gjellestad began in June 2020, overseen by Professor Knut Paasche from the Norwegian Institute for Cultural Heritage Research. It is estimated to be over 20 metres long, although only parts of the keel have survived. This would mean that the boat is of a similar size to the Gokstad ship. The identity of the boat's occupant has not yet been confirmed, but experts have speculated that it may have belonged to a king or queen.

By July 2021, archaeologists had exposed the keel of the ship and discovered the remains of a Viking axe. As of December 2021, exploratory excavations and metal detecting surveys in the surrounding area have revealed the existence of a Viking longhouse, a feasting hall, a Norse pagan ritual site, and metal artefacts including an Arabic dirham and three belt buckles.

By December 2022, the archaeological team had completed the excavations. The remains of the keel will be preserved with water-soluble wax. Although most of the wood had disintegrated, the surviving nails will be used to create a 3d reconstruction of the boat. Objects of particular interest included a large amber bead, a spindle whorl, a bracelet, horse and cattle bones, human remains, a comb, a whetstone, fragments of a wooden chest, and two Viking axe heads. The soil from the excavation will be X-rayed and CT scanned before being sifted. The Viken and Halden municipalities intend to open a visitor centre at Gjellestad for viewing the outline of the ship. Meanwhile, the Norwegian Institute for Cultural Heritage Research has begun a research project called Viking Nativity to investigate the land surrounding the Gjellestad ship burial.

== See also ==
- Norges kirker – church building documentation project affiliated with the institute
- Engagement, Sustainability and Diversity: examining recent heritage policy in Norway
