= Edøy Church =

Church in Møre og Romsdal, Norway

- Edøy kirke
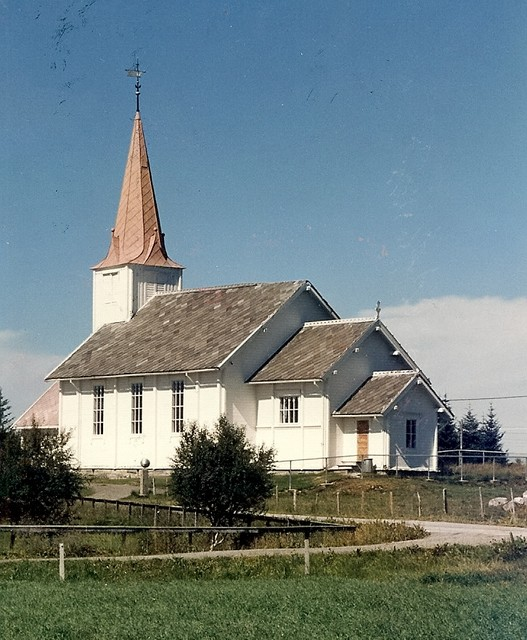
- View of the church
- Edøy Church
- 63.334007076°N 8.0657415390°E
- Location: Smøla Municipality, Møre og Romsdal
- Country: Norway
- Denomination: Church of Norway
- Churchmanship: Evangelical Lutheran

History
- Status: Parish church
- Founded: 1885
- Consecrated: 18 September 1885

Architecture
- Functional status: Active
- Architect(s): Jacob Digre and Johan Digre
- Architectural type: Long church
- Completed: 21 August 1885 (140 years ago)

Specifications
- Capacity: 365
- Materials: Wood

Administration
- Diocese: Møre bispedømme
- Deanery: Ytre Nordmøre prosti
- Parish: Edøy
- Norwegian Cultural Heritage Site
- Type: Church
- Status: Regionally protected
- ID: 84050

Edøy Church (Norwegian: Edøy kirke) is a parish church of the Church of Norway in Smøla Municipality in Møre og Romsdal county, Norway. It is located at Straumen on the southern coast of the island of Smøla. It is the main church for the Edøy parish which is part of the Ytre Nordmøre prosti (deanery) in the Diocese of Møre. The white, wooden church was built in a long church style in 1885 by the architects Jacob Digre and Johan Digre. The church seats about 365 people.

== History ==
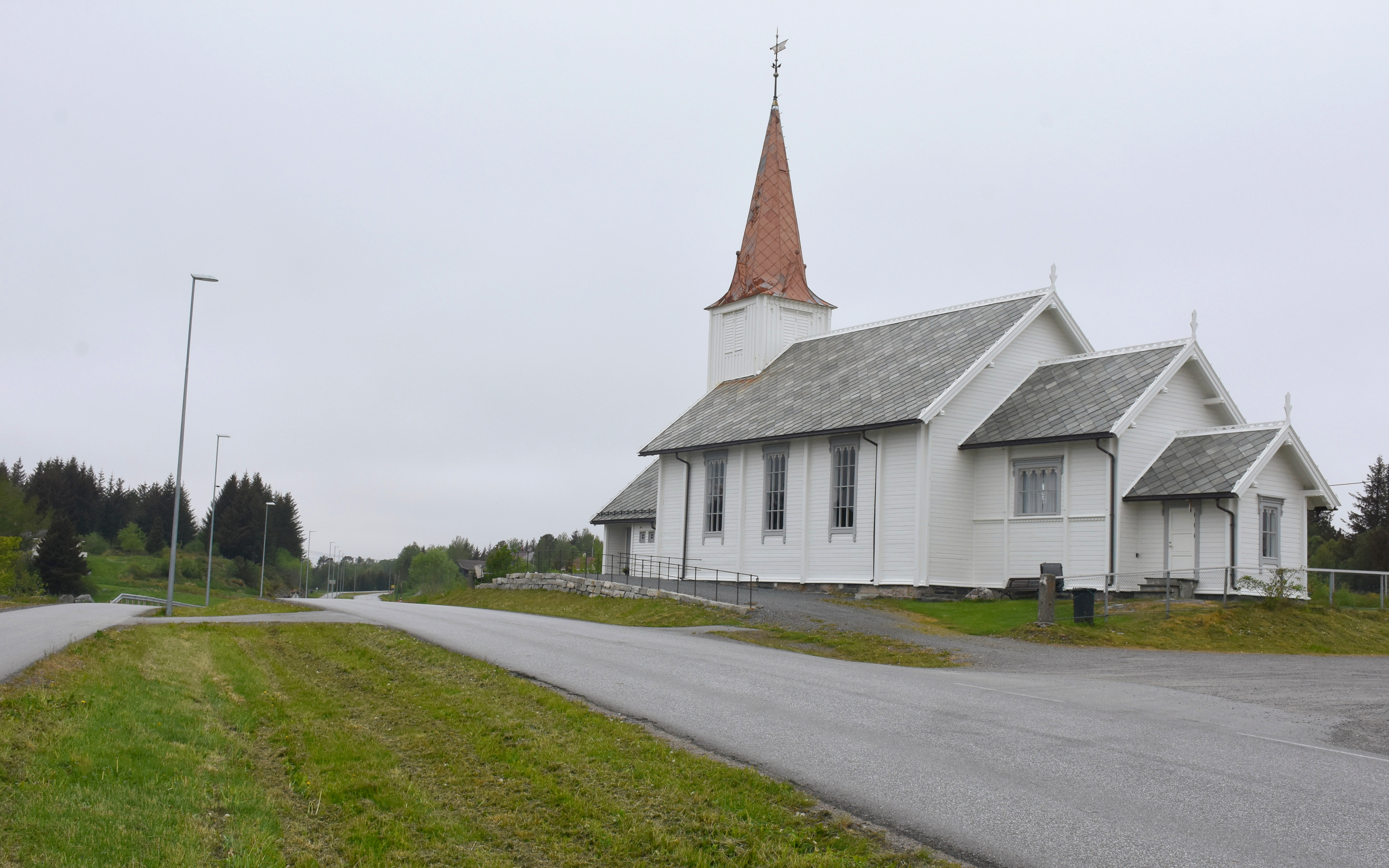
View of the church

The church was built to replace the medieval Old Edøy Church as the main church for old Edøy Municipality. The old church was on the island of Edøya, but this new church was built on the main island of Smøla to be closer to the majority of the parish's population. The church was completed on 21 August 1885 and consecrated on 18 September the same year. The new wooden long church has a rectangular nave and a smaller, rectangular chancel. There is a small sacristy on the east end of the chancel. In 1942, the entrance on the west end was enlarged.

== See also ==
- List of churches in Møre
