= Edøyfjorden =

Fjord in Nordmøre, Norway

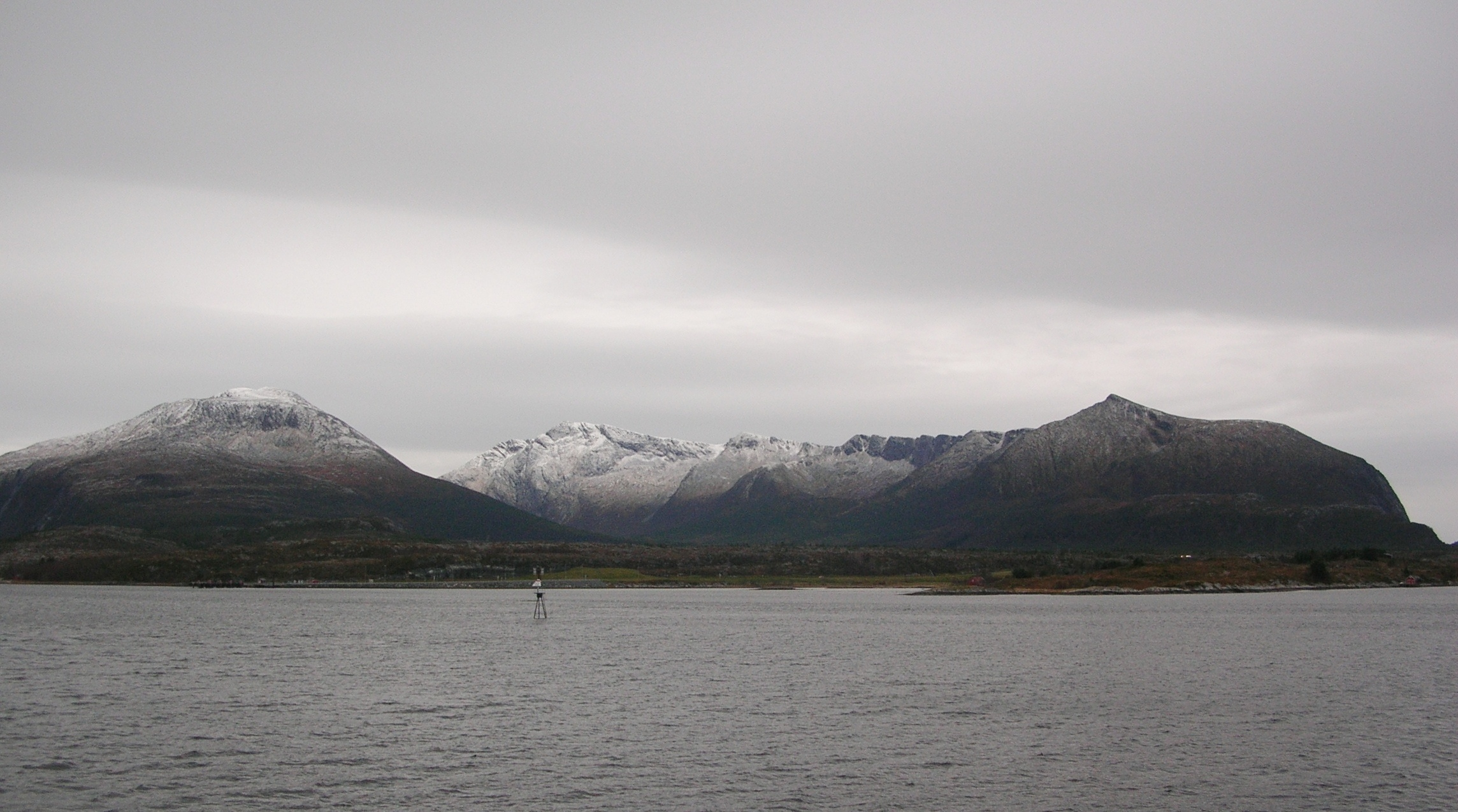
- View of the fjord (looking south towards Tustna)

- Location within Møre og Romsdal
- Interactive map of Edøyfjorden
- Location: Nordmøre, Møre og Romsdal
- Coordinates: 63.3064°N 8.2357°E
- Type: Fjord
- Part of: Edøyfjorden Basin
- Primary outflows: Norwegian Sea (southwest); Trondheimsleia and Ramsøyfjorden (northeast)
- Ocean/sea sources: Norwegian Sea
- Basin countries: Norway
- Max. length: 26 km (16 mi)
- Max. width: 9 km (5.6 mi)
- Islands: Smøla, Edøya, and Kuli (north side); Tustna, Stabblandet, Solskjeløya, Ertvågsøya, and Grisvågøya (south side)
- Settlements: Smøla Municipality; Aure Municipality

Edøyfjorden is a fjord (more technically, a strait) in the Nordmøre region of Møre og Romsdal county, Norway. The 26-kilometre (16 mi) long fjord runs between Smøla Municipality and Aure Municipality with many large and small islands on both sides. Some of the major islands include Smøla, Edøya, and Kuli on the north side and Tustna, Stabblandet, Solskjeløya, Ertvågsøya, and Grisvågøya on the south side. The fjord flows into the Norwegian Sea on its southwestern end and into the Trondheimsleia and Ramsøyfjorden on the northeastern end.

== See also ==
- List of Norwegian fjords
