= Smøla (island) =

Island in Smøla Municipality, Norway

- Interactive map of Smøla

Geography
- Location: Møre og Romsdal, Norway
- Coordinates: 63.3566°N 8.0342°E
- Archipelago: Smøla
- Area: 216 km^{2} (83 sq mi)
- Area rank: 1. 19 in Norway
- Length: 17 km (10.6 mi)
- Width: 20.8 km (12.92 mi)
- Highest elevation: 64 m (210 ft)
- Highest point: Nelvikberget

Administration
- Norway
- County: Møre og Romsdal
- Municipality: Smøla Municipality

Smøla is the 19th largest island in Norway. The island is located in Smøla Municipality in Møre og Romsdal county; the vast majority of the municipality is the island. The island has a good road network across the island that connects it to many of the small surrounding islands, however, it does not have any outside road connections to the rest of Norway. The only regular ferry service is via the small island of Edøya to the south of Smøla, which one can drive to and from Smøla.

The population of the island is mostly employed in the fishing industry or in industries that support the fishing industry. There is also a window factory on the island, as well as some dairy and vegetable farming (especially carrots).

== Geography ==
The island lies to the north of the Edøyfjorden and to the west of the Ramsøyfjorden, about 25 kilometres (16 mi) north of the town of Kristiansund. The islands of Hitra and Frøya lie to the northeast, Skardsøya and Ertvågsøya to the southeast, Stabblandet and Tustna to the south, and the open Norwegian Sea to the west and north.

The 214-square-kilometre (83 sq mi) island is very low and marshy with only 5% of the land cultivated into agricultural use. The highest point on the island is the 63-metre (207 ft) high Nerdvikberget. The island is surrounded by literally thousands of small islets including the historically-important island of Edøya. Due to the flat, unobstructed nature of the island, the Smøla Wind Farm is located on the northwestern part of the island.

== History ==
Scientists of the Institute of Geodesy and Geoinformationtechnique of Technische Universität Berlin were testing the antique maps of Ptolemy and recognized a pattern of calculation mistakes that occurred when one tried to convert the old coordinates from Ptolemy into modern cartographical maps. The scientists believe that, when one compensates for these mistakes, the mythological location Thule corresponds to the island of Smøla.

The island has been governed by a variety of municipalities over the years. At one point it was divided over 3 different municipalities: Brattvær Municipality, Hopen Municipality, and Edøy Municipality. Today, there are 3 churches on the island (Brattvær Church, Hopen Church, and Edøy Church), each was the main church for those respective municipalities. Since 1960, the whole island has been part of the same municipality. The largest population centres on the island are the villages of Hopen (in the north) and Råket-Dyrnes (in the northwest).

== Media gallery ==
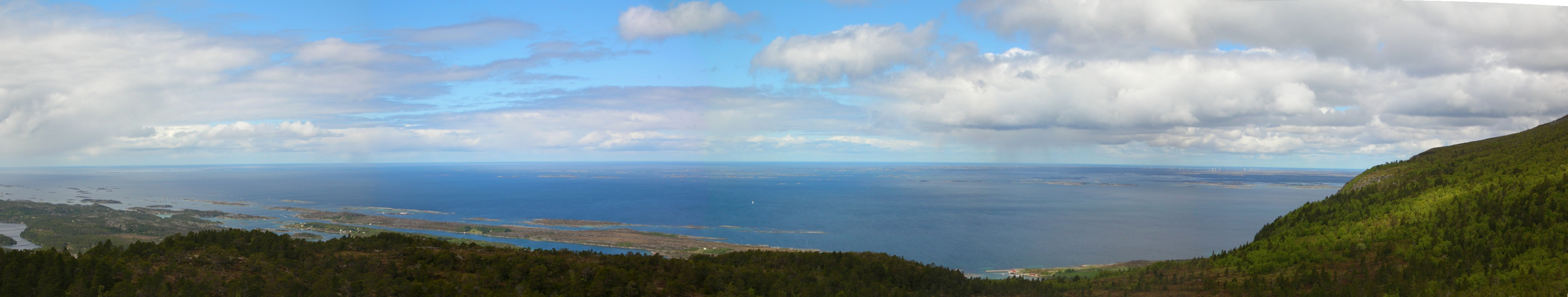
View of Smøla from Tustna in the distance to the right – you can see the Smøla Wind Farm if you enlarge the picture.

== See also ==
- List of islands of Norway
