= Rex Perpetuus Norvegiae =

Term for King Olaf II of Norway

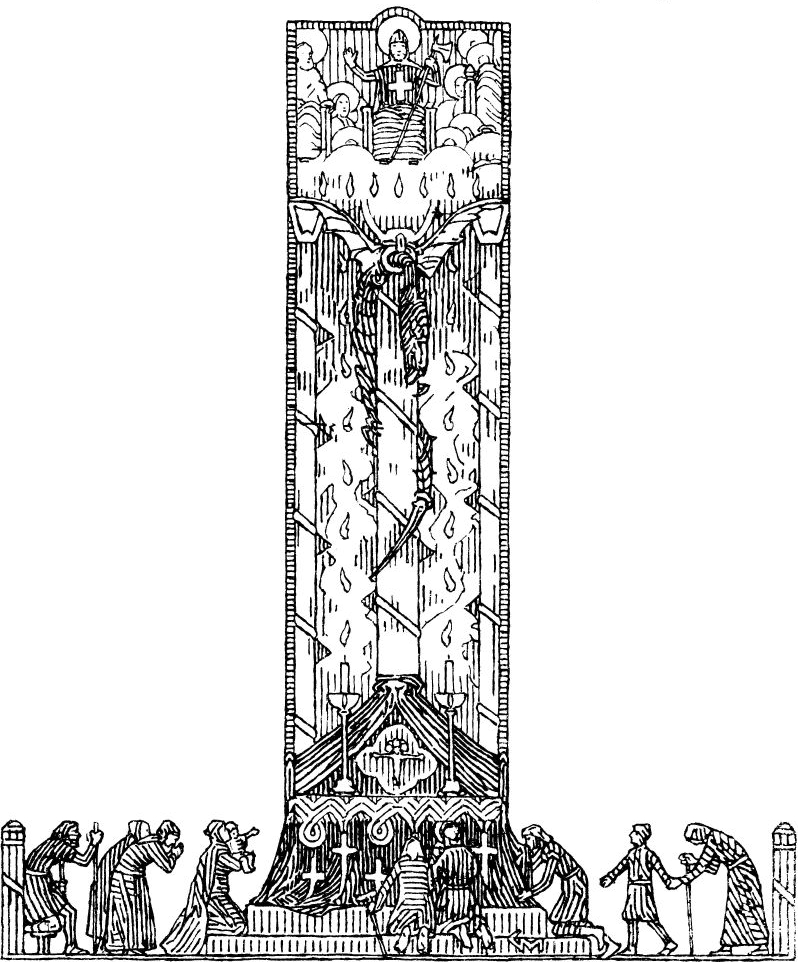
Illustration for Olav den helliges saga (1899)

Rex Perpetuus Norvegiæ (Latin, i.e. Norway's Eternal King) is a term for King Olaf II of Norway, also known as Saint Olaf (Olav den hellige).

== Background ==
In written sources, the term Perpetuus rex Norvegiæ appears from the second half of the 12th century in Historia Norvegiæ.

Olaf's great-nephew, King Magnus III of Norway and of Mann and the Isles, reportedly was the first king known to use the Norwegian lion in his standard although Snorri Sturluson is the only source for this. The first instance of the lion bearing an axe is found in a seal of King Eric II of Norway (1285). The axe represents Olaf II as 'martyr and saint'.

== Gallery ==
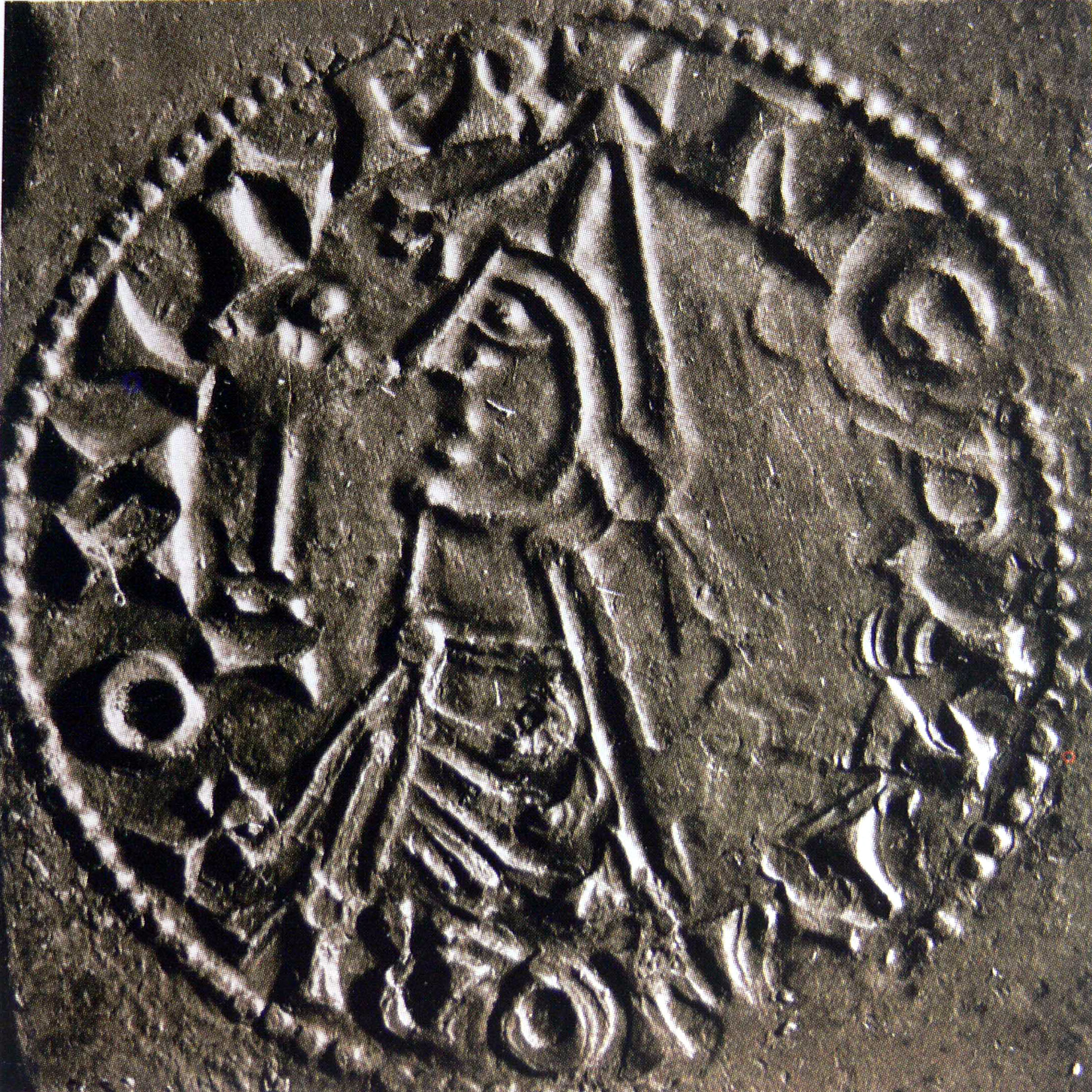
Silver coin of King Olav II (ca. 1023–28)

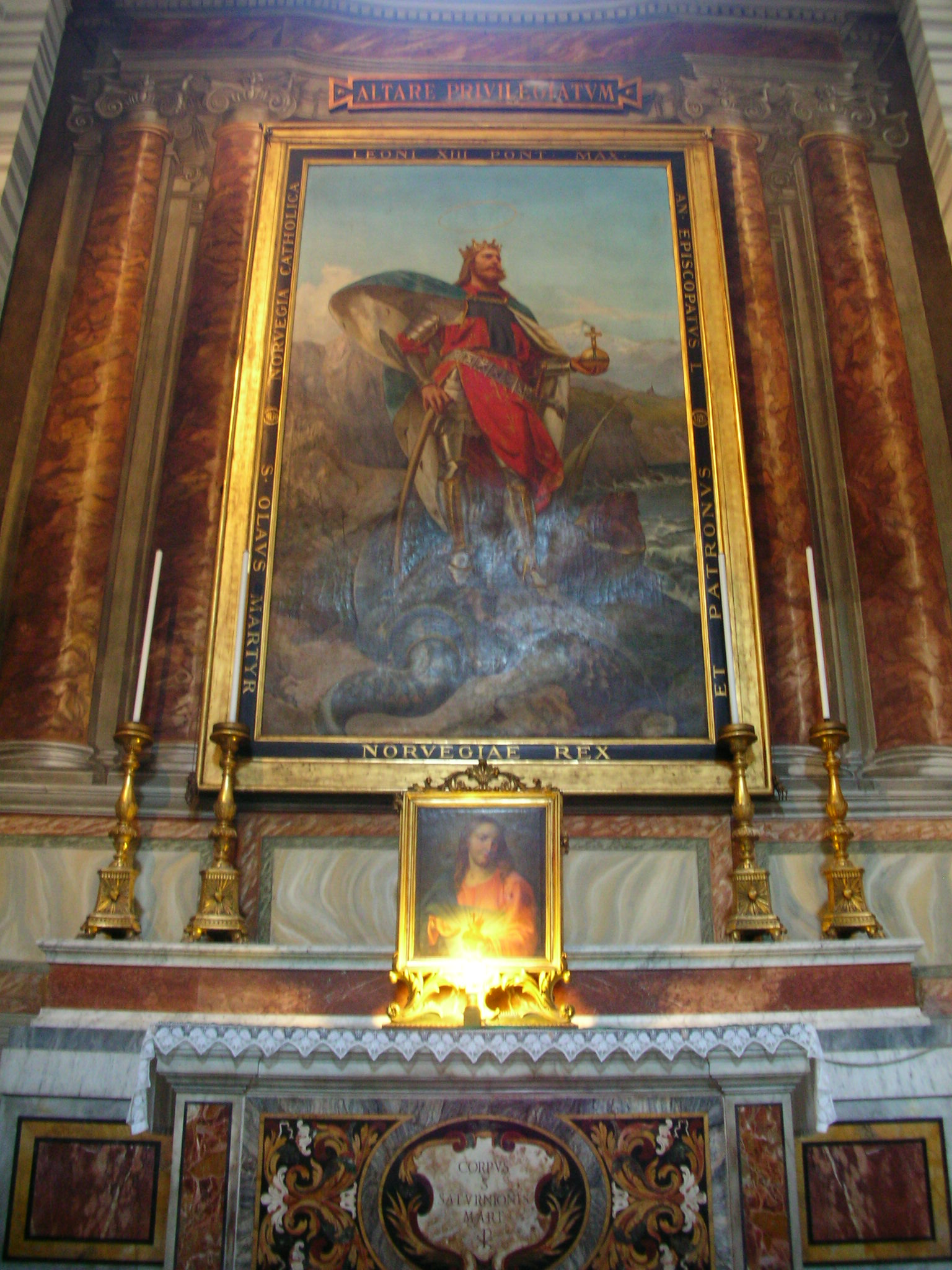
Sant'Olav II, Re di Norvegia in San Carlo al Corso by Pius Weloński (1893)

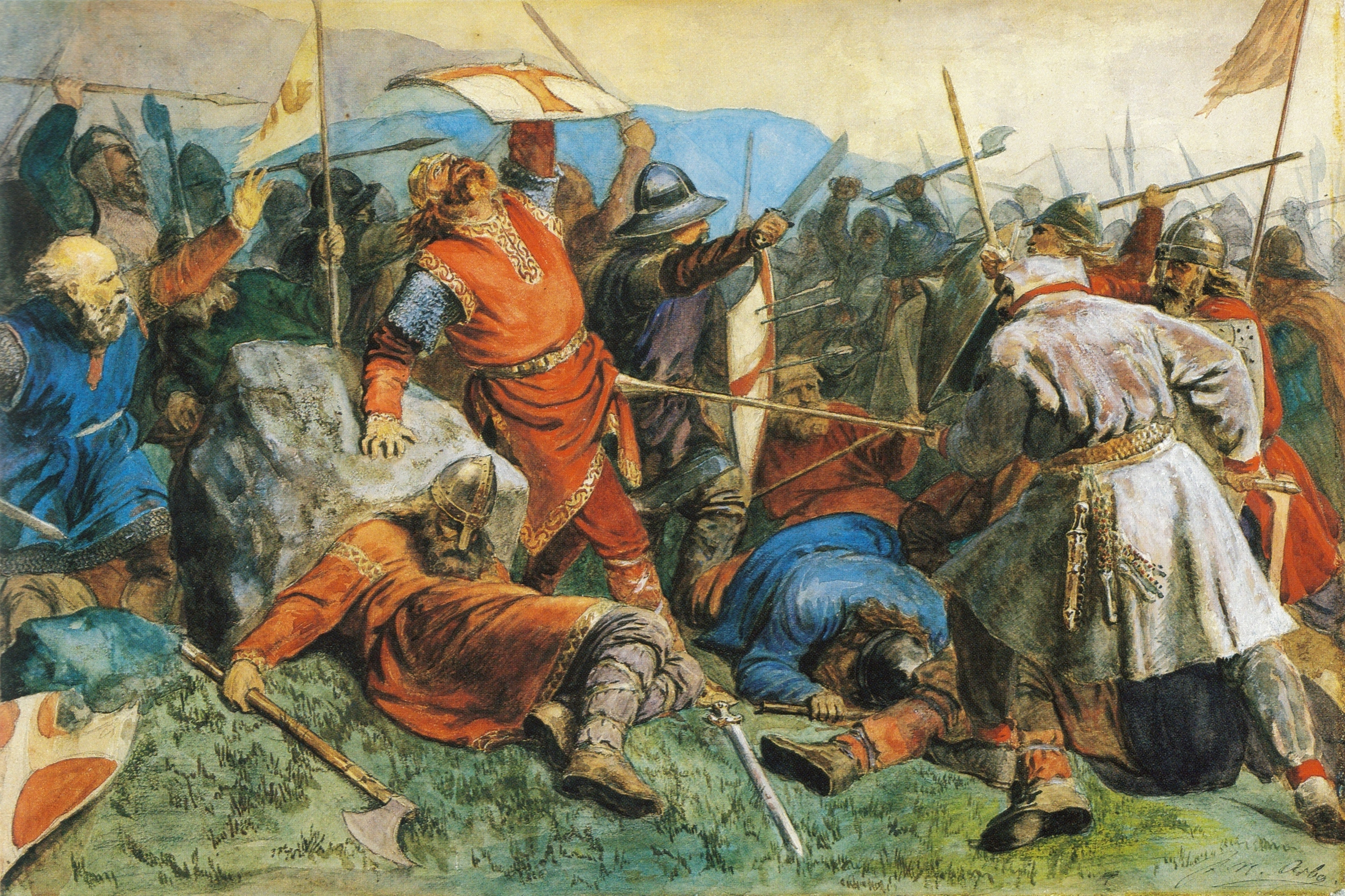
Olav den Helliges død by Peter Nicolai Arbo (ca. 1859)

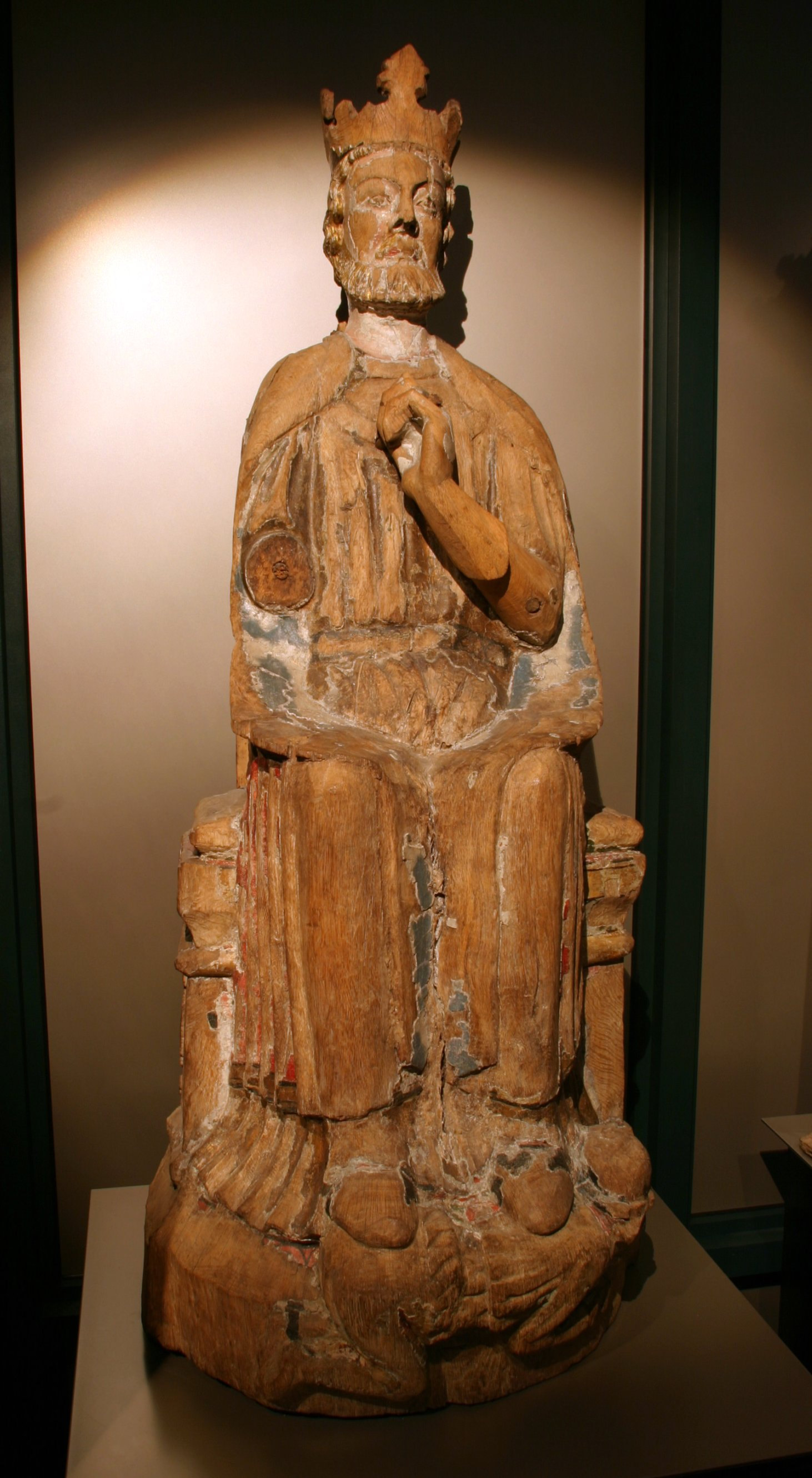
Statue of Saint Olaf exhibited in University Museum of Bergen (ca. 1400)

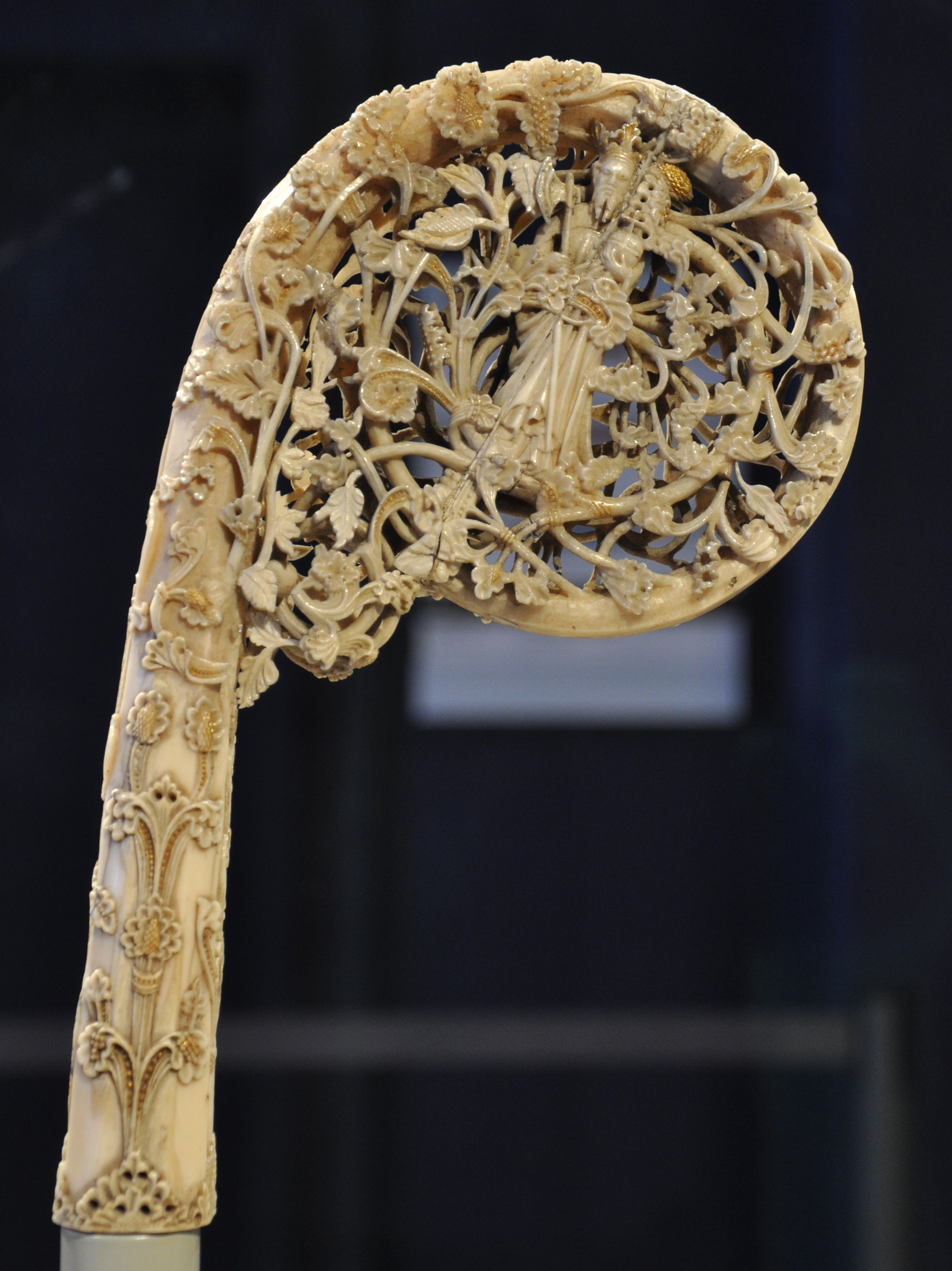
Head of a crosier from Norway showing St Olaf with his axe. Victoria and Albert Museum. (1375-1400)

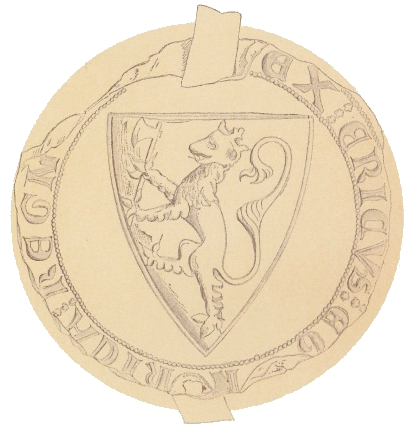
Seal of King Eric II of Norway (1285)

Norwegian coat of arms (Standardised variant from 1992)

== See also ==
- Legendary Saga of St. Olaf
- Separate Saga of St. Olaf
- The Saint Olav Drama
