= Þórarinn loftunga =

Icelandic poet

Þórarinn loftunga was an Icelandic skald active during the first half of the 11th century.

He composed Tögdrápa, a poem in praise of King Canute. Like Sigvatr Þórðarson's poem in praise of the same king, Knútsdrápa, the Tøgdrápa is composed in the metrical form töglag, a variant of dróttkvætt which may have been invented at King Canute's court. According to Skáldatal, Þórarinn was also a court poet to Sveinn Knútsson, son of Knút, and his mother Ælfgifu of Northampton. In Sveinn's honour, he wrote Glælognskviða, which is also the oldest extant testimony to the sainthood of King Olaf II of Norway.

== Works ==
1. Höfuðlausn. Two lines referring to Canute: Knútr verr grund sem gætir / Gríklands himinríki. ("As Christ the heavenly kingdom, / Knútr defends the country.").
2. Tøgdrápa. Eight stanzas, most of which are cited in for instance, Óláfs saga helga, the Legendary Saga of St. Olaf and the Óláfs saga helga of Heimskringla.
3. Glælognskviða. Ten stanzas, cited in for instance, Óláfs saga helga and the Óláfs saga helga of Heimskringla.

== Online editions ==
- Þórarinn loftunga, works edited by Matthew Townend, Skaldic Poetry of the Scandinavian Middle Ages.
- Þórarinn loftunga All extant poetry
- Þórarinn loftunga, Glælognskviða An edition of the poem with short notes on the skald.
