= Passio Olavi =

Collection of legends about Saint Olaf

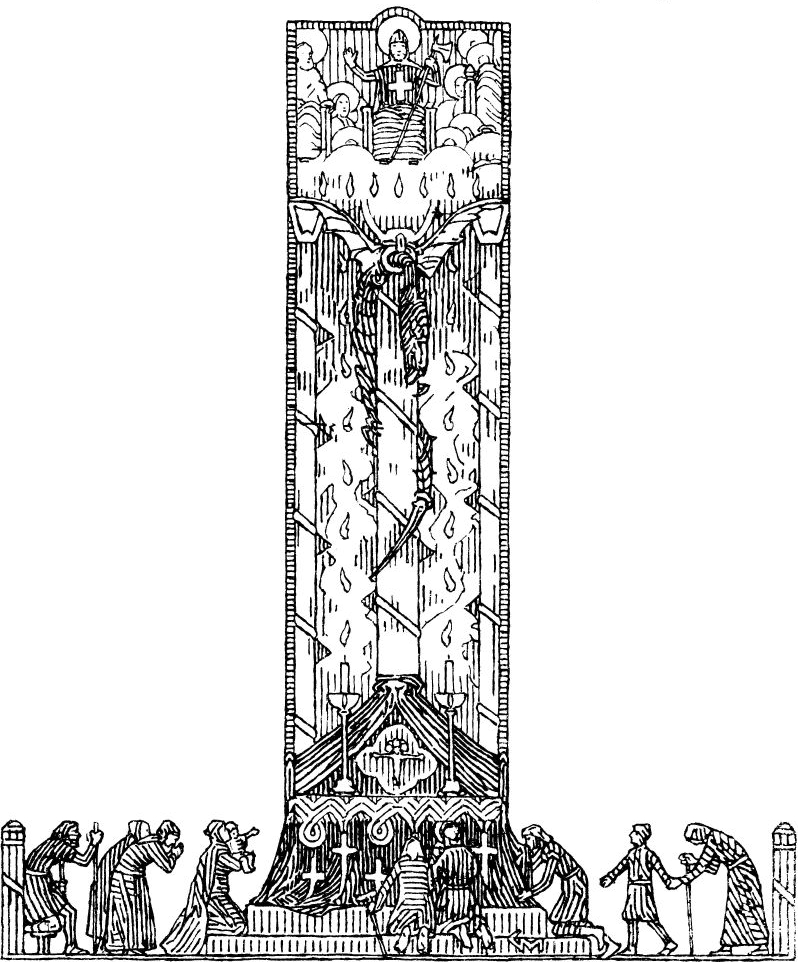
Gerhard Munthe: Illustration for the Saga of St Olaf in the Heimskringla (1899 edition), showing Olaf as the King of Heaven

Passio a miracule beati Olavi ('The Passion and Miracles of the Blessed Olaf'), better known as Passio Olavi, is a collection of legends about the Norwegian national saint Olaf II the Holy. The text was probably collected while Eysteinn Erlendsson was Archbishop of Nidaros (1159–1188) and is possibly written by Eysteinn himself. Egil Kraggerud dated the Passio Olavi to c. 1150–1160.

The text is available in two versions, the more familiar long version is an Old Norse version of an Old Norwegian Homily Book, read on St Olaf's feast day (Olsok). A shorter version in Latin had wide distribution and is found in several places in Europe including : England, France, Austria and Finland. The long version is also known in an English manuscript from Fountains Abbey near York, which was the parent monastery of Lyse Abbey in Norway.

== Editions ==
- Metcalfe, Frederick, ed. (1881). Passio et miracula beati Olaui: edited from a twelfth-century manuscript in the Library of Corpus Christi College, Oxford. Oxford: Clarendon Press.
- Phelpstead, Carl (comm.); Kunin, Devra (tr.) (2001). A history of Norway, and the passion and miracles of blessed Óláfr (PDF). Viking Society for Northern Research. ISBN 0903521482.
- Skard, Eiliv (tr.), ed. (1930). Passio Olavi; lidingssoga og undergjerningane åt den heilage Olav (in Norwegian). Carsten Lien (binding). Oslo: Samlaget.
  - 2nd ed., Det Norske samlaget, 1970
  - Facsimile edition. (with foreword by Arne Bakken). Det Norske samlaget, 1995. ISBN 82-521-4397-0
- Storm, Gustav, ed. (1880). "Acta sancti Olavi regis et martyris". Monumenta historica Norvegiæ. Trykt hos A.W. Brøgger. pp. 125–44. - shorter version
