= Óláfs saga helga =

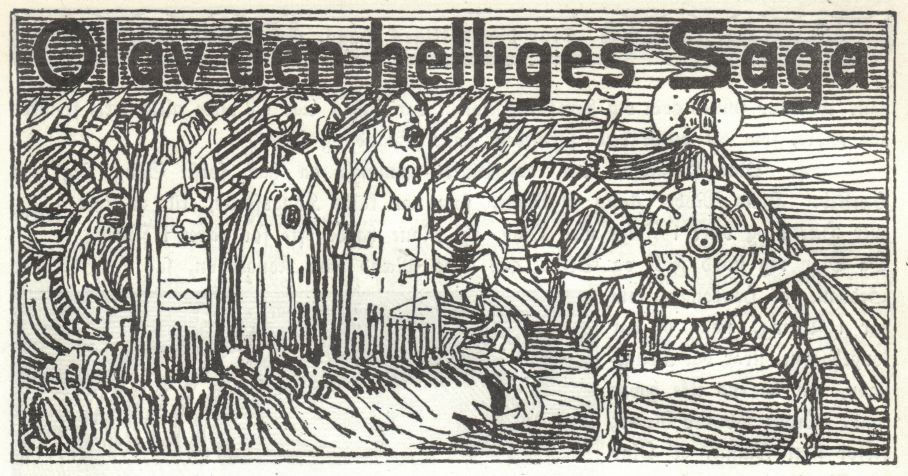

Óláfs saga helga or the Saga of St. Olaf, written in several versions, is one of kings' sagas (konunga sǫgur) on the subject of King Olaf Haraldsson the Saint.

== List of saga versions ==
- Oldest Saga of St. Olaf, ca. 1190, mostly lost.
- Legendary Saga of St. Olaf, ca. 1210.
- Óláfs saga helga by Styrmir Kárason, ca. 1220, mostly lost.
- Separate Saga of St. Olaf, by Snorri Sturluson, ca. 1225.
- Óláfs saga helga in Heimskringla, by Snorri Sturluson, ca. 1230.
- Óláfs saga helga in Flateyjarbók, an expanded version of the Separate Saga of St. Olaf.

== Overview ==
The saga draws from skaldic poetry and Latin hagiography, with embellishments from popular oral legends.

The earliest version, the so-called Oldest Saga of St. Olaf probably written in Iceland, has not survived except in a few fragments. The next version, commonly known as the Legendary Saga of St. Olaf (also designated Helgisagan um Ólaf digra Haraldsson "Holy saga of Olaf Haraldsson the Stout"), is preserved in a unique Norwegian manuscript, De La Gardie 8 (in the possession of Uppsala University Library). A third, by Icelandic cleric Styrmir Kárason, is also now lost except as chapters excerpted and added to the Flateyjarbók recension, these fragments demonstrating evidence of a richer rhetorical style. (Note: The interpolations from Styrmir are given in appendix to Vigfússon & Unger 1868, III, 237-248 (cited by: Bjarni Aðalbjarnarson 1941))

Snorri Sturluson not long thereafter supposedly compiled his version of the saga, written under an "overall plan" of a more secular design, in the style of "Icelandic saga tradition as well as .. secular biographies in the Latin tradition". This work has been termed the Separate Saga of St. Olaf, by scholars to distinguish it from the form today found in what is referred to as Heimskringla.

Snorri may have derived his versions from the Legendary sagas and Styrmir's version, or at least, he seems to use have used the same common sources as these earlier versions.

Later redactions contain Snorri's version at the core, but are expanded using additional material. For example, the Flateyjarbók redaction (and the AM 61 variant which serves as the base text for the saga in the Fornmanna sögur series) contains a much more detailed account of the capture of the sword Bæsingr from the burial mound of Olaf Geirstad-Alf to be given to the infant St. Olaf, who is hinted as being a reincarnation of his namesake. The sword was later renamed Hnæite/Hneitir/Hneiti ("Hacker"), and subsequently used by St. Olaf to combat the margýgr (mermaid, sea-hag, sea-giantess) and great boar that the heathens worship in idolatry. The use of the sword Bæsingr-Hneiti against the mermaid and boar are illustrated in the Flateyjarbók.

== Saga sources ==
=== Skaldic verse ===
- Þórarinn loftunga speaks of the miracle at Olaf's grave in his Glælognskviða (his body remains as if alive, and blind men consult him to return healed). The same poet ironically also composed the Tøgdrápa in praise of Olaf being driven out of Norway by Knut.
- Sigvatr Þórðarson's Erfidrápa Óláfs helga, mentions the horns on Vísundr (Bison), the name of Olaf's ship that had a bison's head on the stem.
- Einarr Skúlason's Geisli ("Ray of Light").

=== Hagiography ===
Among the hagiographic sources known to be used are two lost Lives (Vitæ) of the saint in Latin, and the Passio et miracula beati Olavi, dating to mid 12th century
