= The Saint Olav Drama =

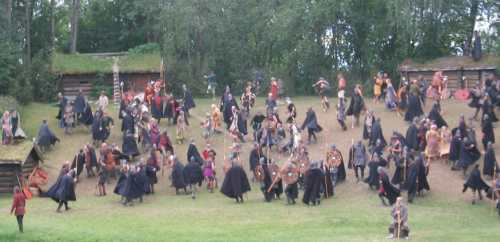
The Saint Olav Drama, 2003

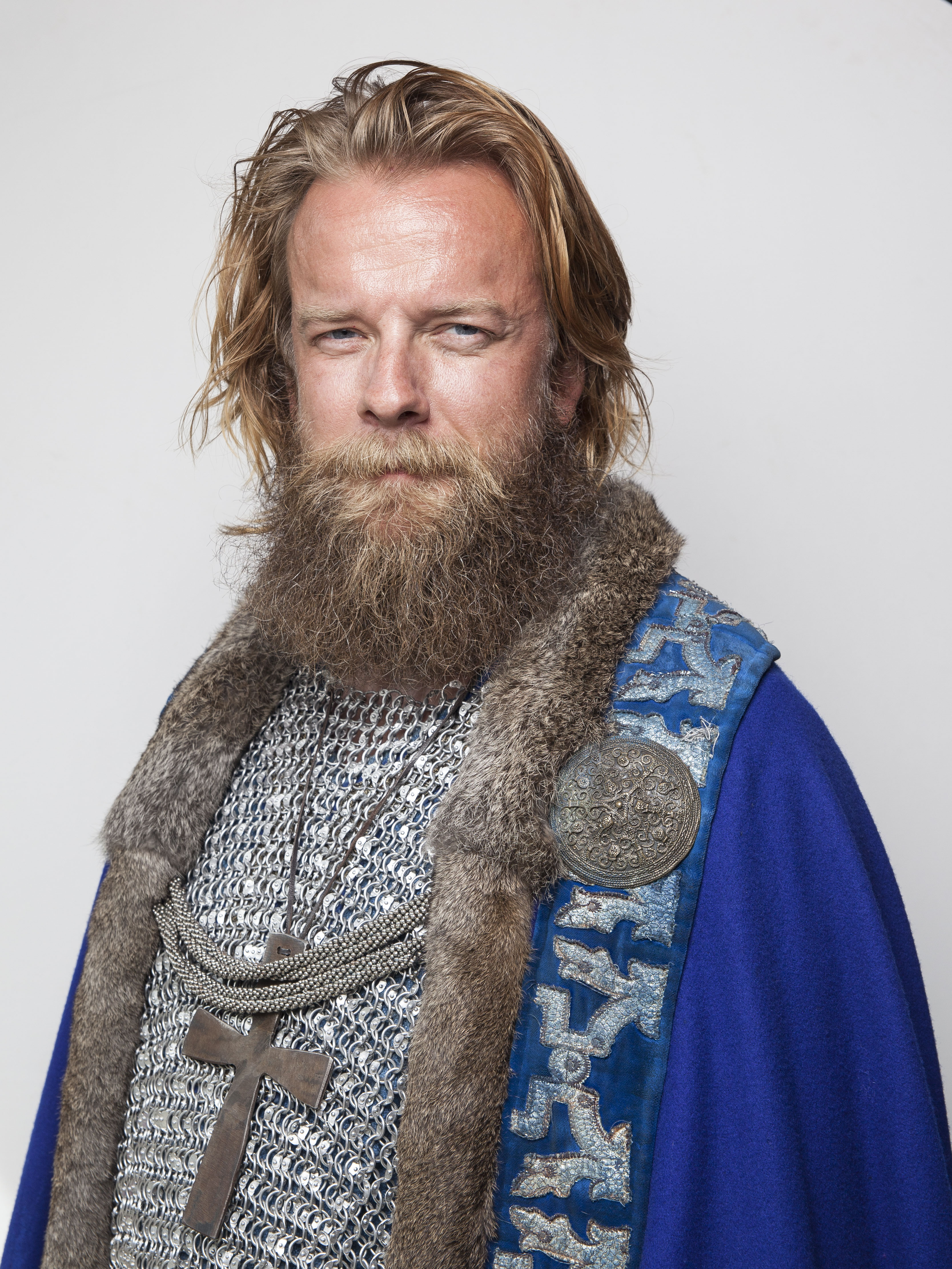
Pål Christian Eggen acting as king Olaf II of Norway in The Saint Olav Drama at Stiklestad 2014.

Saint Olav Drama (Norwegian: Spelet om Heilag Olav) is an outdoor theatre performance played every end of July in Stiklestad in Verdal Municipality, Norway.

The play commemorates the Battle of Stiklestad that took place in the year 1030, and which resulted in death of King Olaf II of Norway. In the aftermath of his death, King Olaf would later be canonized as Saint Olaf (Heilag Olav), patron saint of Norway. The play explores the transition process between traditional pagan customs and the introduction of Christianity into Norway.

The play draws on historic events mentioned in Heimskringla written by Snorri Sturlson. The play features other historical Norwegian figures, including Rögnvald Brusason and Thorir Hund.

Saint Olav Drama was written by Olav Gullvåg, with music composed by Paul Okkenhaug (1908-1975). It has been staged every year since 1954. Among featured directors have been Norwegian stage producer Stein Winge.

== See also ==
- Olsok
- Óláfs saga helga
- Oldest Saga of St. Olaf
- Legendary Saga of St. Olaf
- Separate Saga of St. Olaf

== Other sources ==
- Berezin, Henrik Adventure Guide Scandinavia (Hunter Publishing, 2012) ISBN 9781588436030
- March, Linda Norway - Culture Smart!: the essential guide to customs & culture ( Kuperard. 2006) ISBN 978-1857333312
- Myklebus, Morten. Olaf Viking & Saint (Norwegian Council for Cultural Affairs, 1997) ISBN 978-82-7876-004-8
- O'Leary, Margaret Hayford Culture and Customs of Norway (Greenwood. 2010) ISBN 978-0313362484

In Norwegian

- Andersen, Per Sveaa Samlingen av Norge og kristningen av landet : 800–1130 (Universitetsforlaget; 1977) ISBN 8200024121
- Ekrem, Inger; Lars Boje Mortensen; Karen Skovgaard-Petersen Olavslegenden og den Latinske Historieskrivning i 1100-tallets Norge (Tusculanum Press; 2000) ISBN 978-87-7289-616-8
- Hoftun, Oddgeir Kristningsprosessens og herskermaktens ikonografi i nordisk middelalder (Borgen forlag. Oslo; 2008) ISBN 978-82-560-1619-8
- Hoftun, Oddgeir Stavkirkene – og det norske middelaldersamfunnet (Borgen forlag. København; 2002) ISBN 87-21-01977-0
