= Oldest Saga of St. Olaf =

Norse kings' saga

The Oldest Saga of St. Olaf or the First Saga of St. Olaf is one of the kings' sagas. It is the earliest Norse biography of King Óláfr Haraldsson. Early scholars judged it to be among the first sagas written, perhaps around 1160, but later scholarship has moved the date up to the end of the 12th century. One fragment with a hagiographic flavour was once thought to belong to the saga but more recent research indicates that it is from another text. Like other kings' sagas the Oldest Saga cites old skaldic poetry to decorate and verify the narrative.

Only six or seven short fragments are preserved of the work but the Legendary Saga of St. Olaf is clearly heavily based on it and often used to make assumptions about its scope. Snorri Sturluson used the Oldest Saga or some work derived from it when he composed his Separate Saga of St. Olaf and the Heimskringla. Styrmir Kárason is also thought to have used the Oldest Saga in the composition of his Óláfs saga.

== See also ==
- The Saint Olav Drama
