= Olaf Haraldsson =

King of Norway from 1015 to 1028

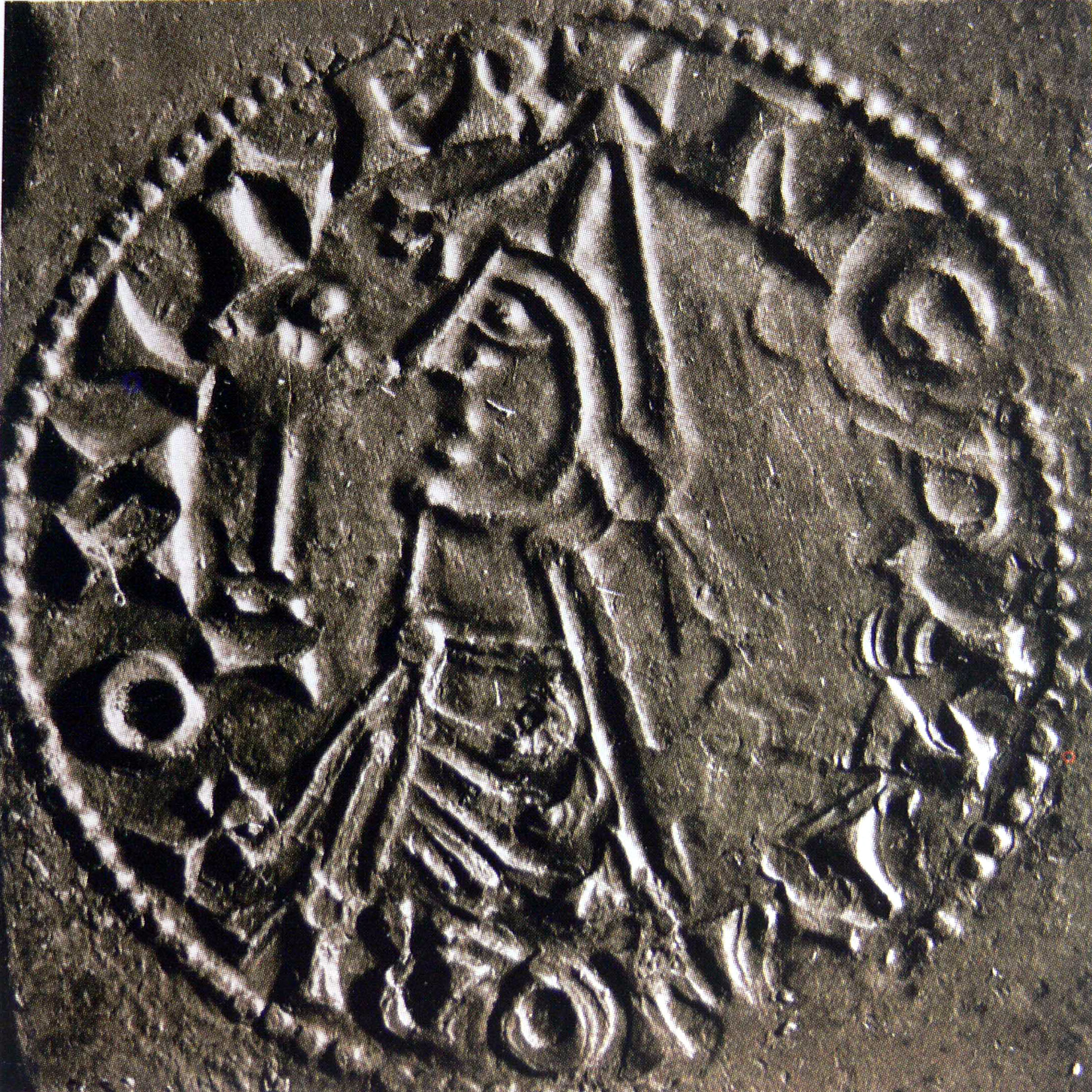
- Coin of Olaf dated 1023–1028

King of Norway
- Reign: 1015–1028
- Predecessor: Harald II
- Successor: Cnut the Great
- Born: c. 995; Ringerike, Norway
- Died: 29 July 1030 (aged around 35); Stiklestad, Norway
- Spouse: Astrid Olofsdotter
- Issue: Wulfhild, Duchess of Saxony; Magnus I of Norway (ill.)
Names
- Olaf "Leif" Haraldsson
- House: Fairhair
- Father: Harald Grenske
- Mother: Åsta Gudbrandsdatter

Olaf Haraldsson (c. 995 – 29 July 1030), also called Saint Olaf, Olaf the Holy, Olaf II, and Olaf the Stout or "Large", was King of Norway from 1015 to 1028. Son of Harald Grenske, a petty king in Vestfold, Norway, he was posthumously given the title Rex Perpetuus Norvegiae (English: Eternal/Perpetual King of Norway) and canonized at Nidaros (Trondheim) by Bishop Grimketel, one year after his death in the Battle of Stiklestad on 29 July 1030. His remains were enshrined in Nidaros Cathedral, built over his burial site. His sainthood encouraged the widespread adoption of Christianity by Scandinavia's Vikings/Norsemen.

Pope Alexander III confirmed Olaf's local canonisation in 1164, making him a recognised saint of the Catholic Church, and Olaf started to be known as Rex Perpetuus Norvegiae – "eternal king of Norway". Following the Reformation, he was a commemorated historical figure among some members of the Lutheran and Anglican Communions.

The saga of Olav Haraldsson and the legend of Olaf the Saint became central to a national identity. Especially during the period of romantic nationalism, Olaf was a symbol of Norwegian independence and pride. Olaf Haraldsson is symbolised by the axe in Norway's coat of arms and Olsok (29 July) is still his day of celebration. Many Christian institutions with Scandinavian links as well as Norway's Order of St. Olav are named after him.

== Name ==
Olaf's Old Norse name is Óláfr Haraldsson [ˈoːlɑːvz̠ ˈhɑrɑldsˌson] (Etymology: Anu- "forefather", -laibaR —"heir"). Olav is the modern equivalent in Norwegian, formerly often spelt Olaf. His name in Icelandic is Óláfr Haraldsson Ólafur [ˈouːlaːvʏr̥], in Faroese Ólavur [ˈɔuːlavʊɹ], in Danish Olav, in Swedish Olof, and in Finnish Olavi. Olave was the traditional spelling in England, preserved in the name of medieval churches dedicated to him. Other names, such as Óláfr hinn helgi, Olavus rex, and Olaf are used interchangeably (see the Heimskringla of Snorri Sturluson). He is sometimes called Rex Perpetuus Norvegiae (English: "Norway's Eternal King"), a designation which goes back to the 13th century.

During his lifetime he was known as Olaf "the stout" or simply as Olaf "the big" (Ólafr digri [ˈdiɣre]; Modern Norwegian Olav Digre). In modern Norway he is commonly called Olav den hellige (Bokmål; Olaf the Holy) or Heilag-Olav (Nynorsk; the Holy Olaf) in recognition of his sainthood.

== Background ==
Olaf Haraldsson is attested having been born in Ringerike, yet Ringerike must not be conflated with the modern notion of the district named after the legendary Ringerike of Ivar Vidfamne and Sigurd Hring, which may be regarded as the confederation of five petty kingdoms conferring with the five kings that established Olaf Haraldson as their High King at Hringsakri according to Saint Olafs Saga, King Hrœrekr, King Guðrøðr, King Hring and two others of less certain identity. Olaf Haraldsson did not become King of Norway until the Battle of Nesjar.

Olaf Haraldsson was the son of Åsta Gudbrandsdatter and Harald Grenske, a petty king in Vestfold. According to later Icelandic sagas, Harald Grenske was the son of Gudrød Bjørnsson, son of King Bjørn Farmann in Vestfold, who was in turn son of King Harald I Fairhair Halvdansson. The latter had unified Norway as one Kingdom, establishing a feudalist structure with the kingship far less dependent on local rulers. Thus, according to the sagas, Olaf was a great-great-grandson in the male line of the founder of the Norwegian kingdom. Harald Grenske died when Åsta Gudbrandsdatter was pregnant with Olaf. Åsta later married Sigurd Syr, with whom she had other children, including Harald Hardrada, who later reigned as king of Norway.

The petty kings of Ringerike seem to have had some claims to the High Kingship of the Commonwealth of Uppsala posing a possible threat to the royal House of Munsö under King Olof Skötkonung. The Earls of Hlaðir and the petty kings of Hringerike, had been in conflict since at least King Harald Fairhair assumed power of all of Norway.

== Saga sources for Olaf Haraldsson ==
Many texts have information about Olaf Haraldsson. The oldest is the Glælognskviða or "Sea-Calm Poem", composed by Þórarinn loftunga, an Icelander. It praises Olaf and mentions some of the famous miracles attributed to him. The Norwegian synoptic histories also mention Olaf. These include the Ágrip af Nóregskonungasögum (c. 1190), the Historia Norwegiae (c. 1160–1175) and a Latin text, Historia de Antiquitate Regum Norwagiensium by Theodoric the Monk (c. 1177–1188).

Icelanders also wrote extensively about Olaf and there are several Icelandic sagas about him, including Fagrskinna (c. 1220) and Morkinskinna (c. 1225–1235). Heimskringla (c. 1225), by Snorri Sturluson, largely bases its account of Olaf on the earlier Fagrskinna. The sources seem to say that he had been raised in the Norse pagan religion, but converted to Christ early in his adulthood. The Oldest Saga of St. Olaf (c. 1200) is important to scholars for its constant use of skaldic verses, many of which are attributed to Olaf himself.

Finally, many hagiographic sources describe St. Olaf, but these focus mostly on miracles attributed to him and cannot be used to accurately recreate his life. A notable one is The Passion and the Miracles of the Blessed Olafr.

== Reign ==
A widely used account of Olaf's life is found in Heimskringla from c. 1225. Although its facts are dubious, the saga recounts Olaf's deeds as follows:

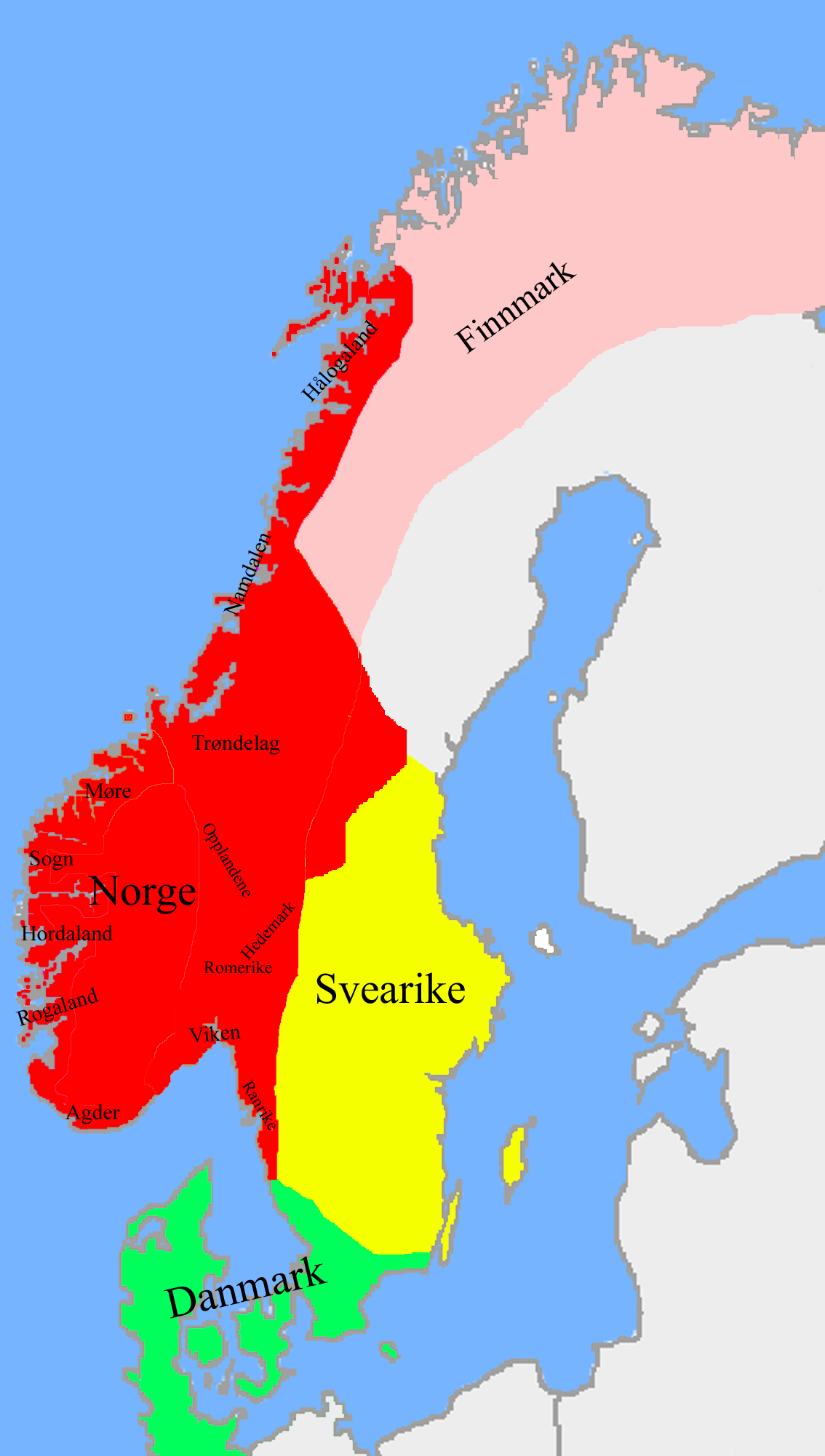
Norway in 1020

In 1008, Olaf landed on the Estonian island of Saaremaa (Osilia). The Osilians, taken by surprise, had at first agreed to Olaf's demands, but then gathered an army during the negotiations and attacked the Norwegians. Olaf nevertheless won the battle.

It is said that Olaf participated alongside fellow Viking Thorkell the Tall in the siege of Canterbury in 1011.

Olaf sailed to the southern coast of Finland sometime in 1008. The journey resulted in the Battle at Herdaler, where Olaf and his men were ambushed by the Finns in the woods. Olaf lost many men but made it back to his boats. He ordered his ships to depart despite a rising storm. The Finns pursued them and made the same progress on land as Olaf and his men made on water. Despite these events they survived. The exact location of the battle is uncertain and the Finnish equivalent of Herdaler is unknown, but it has been suggested that it could be in Uusimaa, probably near present-day Ingå.

As a teenager Olaf went to the Baltic, then to Denmark and later to England. Skaldic poetry suggests he led a successful seaborne attack that took down London Bridge, though Anglo-Saxon sources do not confirm this. This may have been in 1014, restoring London and the English throne to Æthelred the Unready and removing Cnut. According to Snorri's Heimskringla, the attack happened soon after the death of Sweyn Forkbeard with the city being held by Danish forces. Snorri's account claims that Olaf assisted Æthelred in driving the Danes out of England. Olaf is also said by Snorri to have aided the sons of Æthelred after his death. Olaf is said to have won battles but been unable to assist Æthelred's sons in driving Cnut out. After this, he set his sights on Norway.

Olaf saw it as his calling to unite Norway into one kingdom, as Harald Fairhair had largely succeeded in doing. On the way home he wintered with Duke Richard II of Normandy. Marauding Vikings had conquered this region in 881. Richard was himself an ardent Christian, and the Normans had also previously converted to Christianity. Before leaving, Olaf was baptised in Rouen in the pre-Romanesque Notre-Dame Cathedral by Richard's brother Robert the Dane, archbishop of Normandy.

Olaf returned to Norway in 1015 and declared himself king, obtaining the support of the five petty kings of the Norwegian Uplands. In 1016 at the Battle of Nesjar he defeated Earl Sweyn, one of the earls of Lade and hitherto the de facto ruler of Norway. He founded the town of Borg, later known as Sarpsborg, by the waterfall Sarpsfossen in Østfold county. Within a few years he had won more power than any of his predecessors on the throne had enjoyed.

Olaf annihilated the petty kings of the south, subdued the aristocracy, asserted his suzerainty in the Orkney Islands, and conducted a successful raid on Denmark. He made peace with King Olof Skötkonung of Sweden through Þorgnýr the Lawspeaker, and was for some time engaged to Olof's daughter, Ingegerd, though without Olof's approval. In 1019 Olaf married Astrid Olofsdotter, King Olof's illegitimate daughter and the half-sister of his former fiancée. The union produced a daughter, Wulfhild, who married Ordulf, Duke of Saxony in 1042.

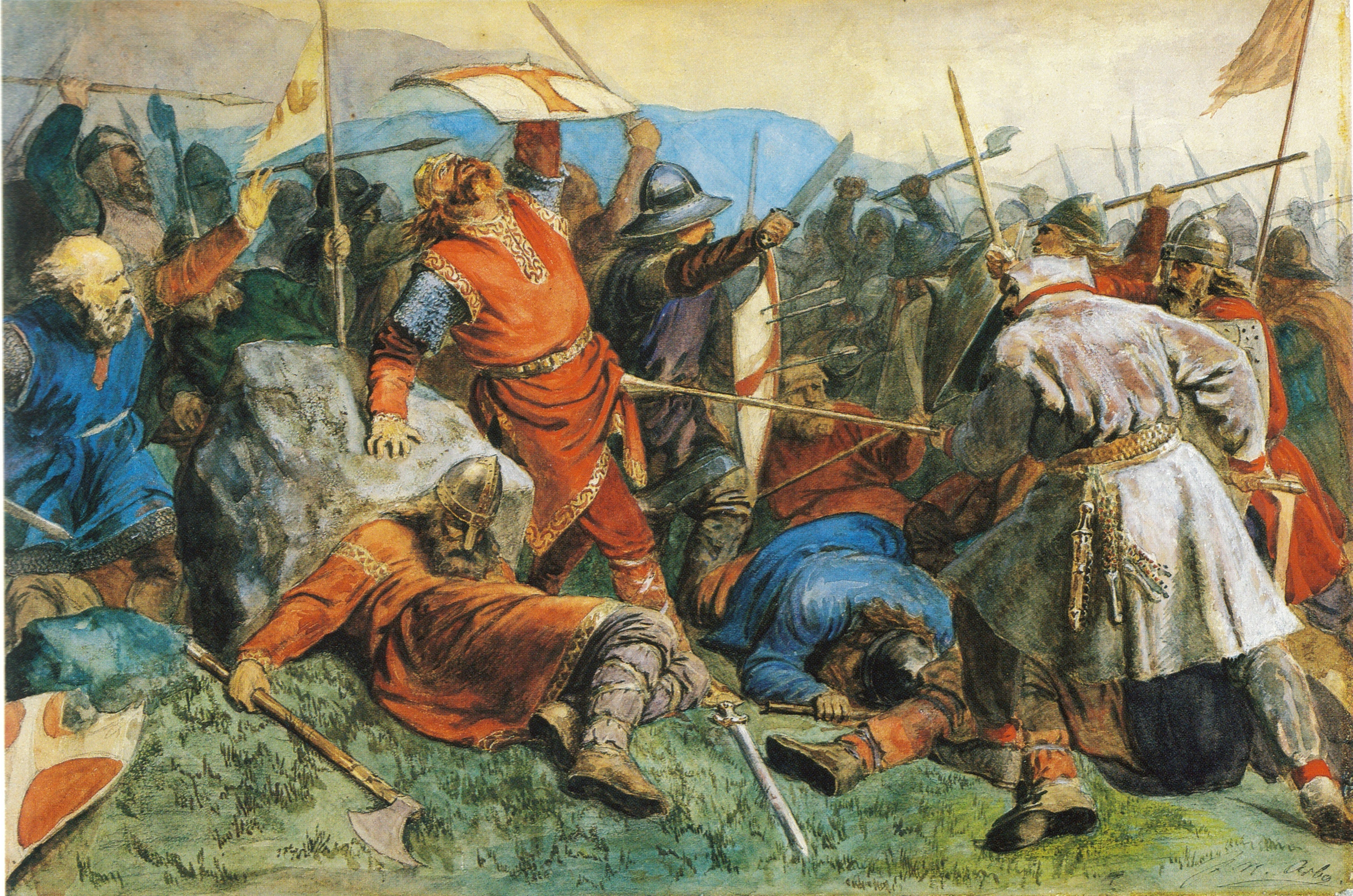
Saint Olav at the Battle of Stiklestad by 19th century artist Peter Nicolai Arbo

In 1026 he participated in the Battle of the Helgeå. In 1029 the Norwegian nobles, seething with discontent, supported the invasion of King Cnut the Great of Denmark. Olaf was driven into exile in Kievan Rus. He stayed for some time in the Swedish province of Nerike, where, according to local legend, he baptised many locals. In 1029, King Cnut's Norwegian regent, Jarl Håkon Eiriksson, was lost at sea and Olaf seized the opportunity to win back the kingdom. Given military and logistical support by the Swedish king Anund Jacob he tried to bypass the formidable "Øresundfleet" of the Danish king by traveling across the Jämtland-mountains to take Nidaros, the Norwegian capital at the time, in 1030. However, Olaf was killed in Battle of Stiklestad on 29 July 1030, where some of his own subjects from central and northern Norway took arms against him. The exact position of Olaf's grave in Nidaros has been unknown since 1568, due to the effects of the Lutheran iconoclasm in 1536–37.

King Cnut, though distracted by the task of governing England, ruled Norway for five years after Stiklestad, with his son Svein and Svein's mother Ælfgifu (known as Álfífa in Old Norse sources) as regents. But their regency was unpopular, and when Olaf's illegitimate son Magnus ('the Good') laid claim to the Norwegian throne, Svein and Ælfgifu were forced to flee.

== Christianising ==
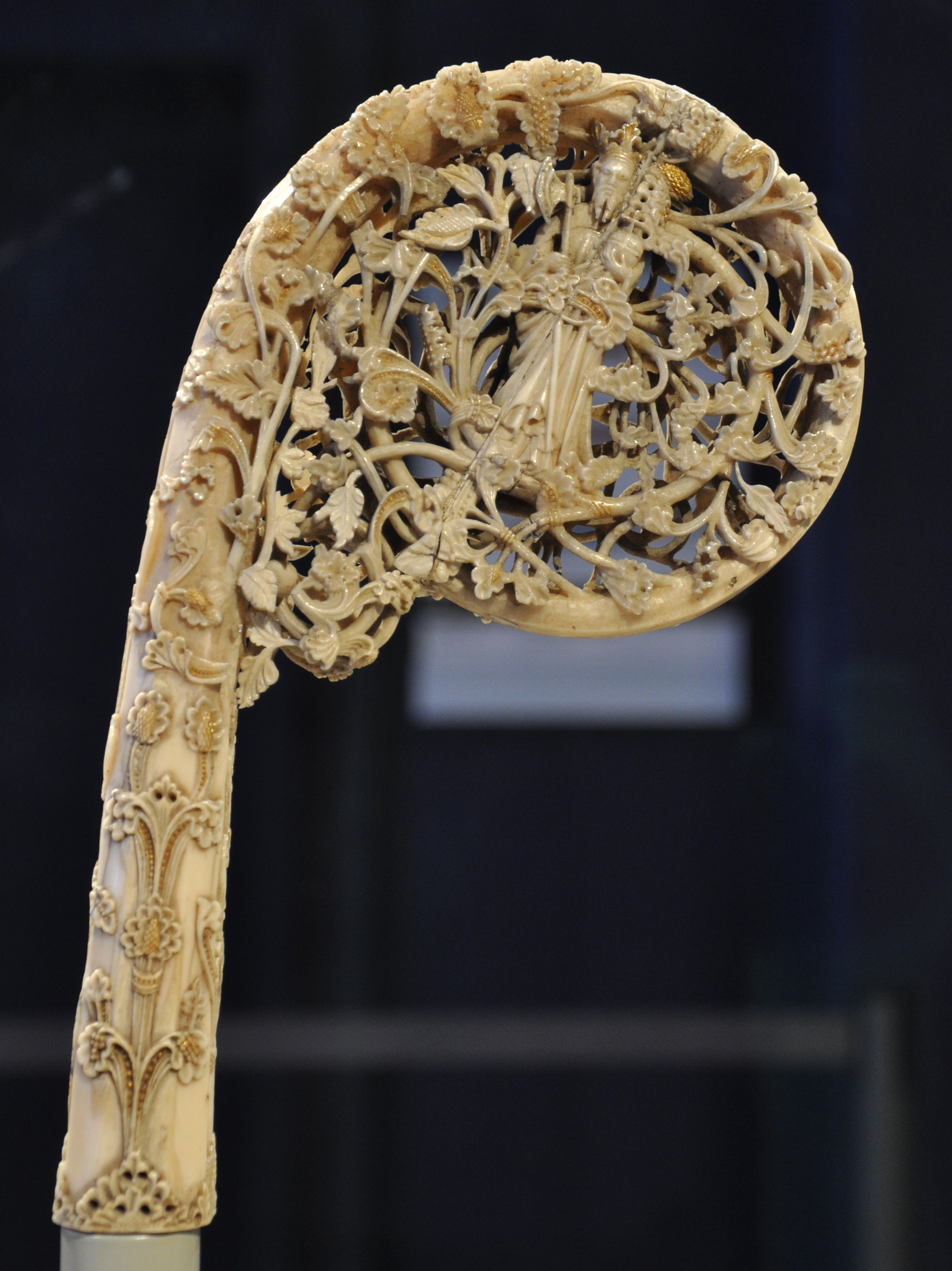
St. Olaf with his ax on a bishop's crozier, walrus ivory, Norway c. 1375–1400

Olaf has traditionally been seen as leading the Christianisation of Norway, but most scholars now believe that Olaf had little to do with the process. Olaf brought with him Grimketel, who is usually credited with helping him create episcopal sees and further organising the Norwegian church, but Grimketel was only a member of Olaf's household and no permanent sees were created until c. 1100. Also, Olaf and Grimketel most likely did not introduce new ecclesiastical laws to Norway; these were ascribed to Olaf at a later date. Olaf most likely did try to bring Christianity to the interior of Norway, where it was less prevalent.

Questions have also been raised about the nature of Olaf's Christianity. Modern historians generally agree that Olaf was inclined to violence and brutality, and note that earlier scholars often neglected this side of his character. It seems that, like many Scandinavian kings, Olaf used his Christianity to gain more power for the monarchy and centralise control in Norway. The skaldic verses attributed to Olaf do not speak of Christianity at all, but use pagan references to describe romantic relationships.

In his book The Conversion of Scandinavia, Anders Winroth argues that there was a "long process of assimilation, in which the Scandinavians adopted, one by one and over time, individual Christian practices." Winroth does not claim that Olaf was not Christian, but argues that we cannot think of any Scandinavians as fully converting as portrayed in the later hagiographies or sagas. Olaf himself is portrayed in later sources as a saintly miracle-working figure to help support this quick view of conversion for Norway, but the historical Olaf did not act this way, as seen especially in the skaldic verses attributed to him.

== Sainthood ==
Saint Olaf
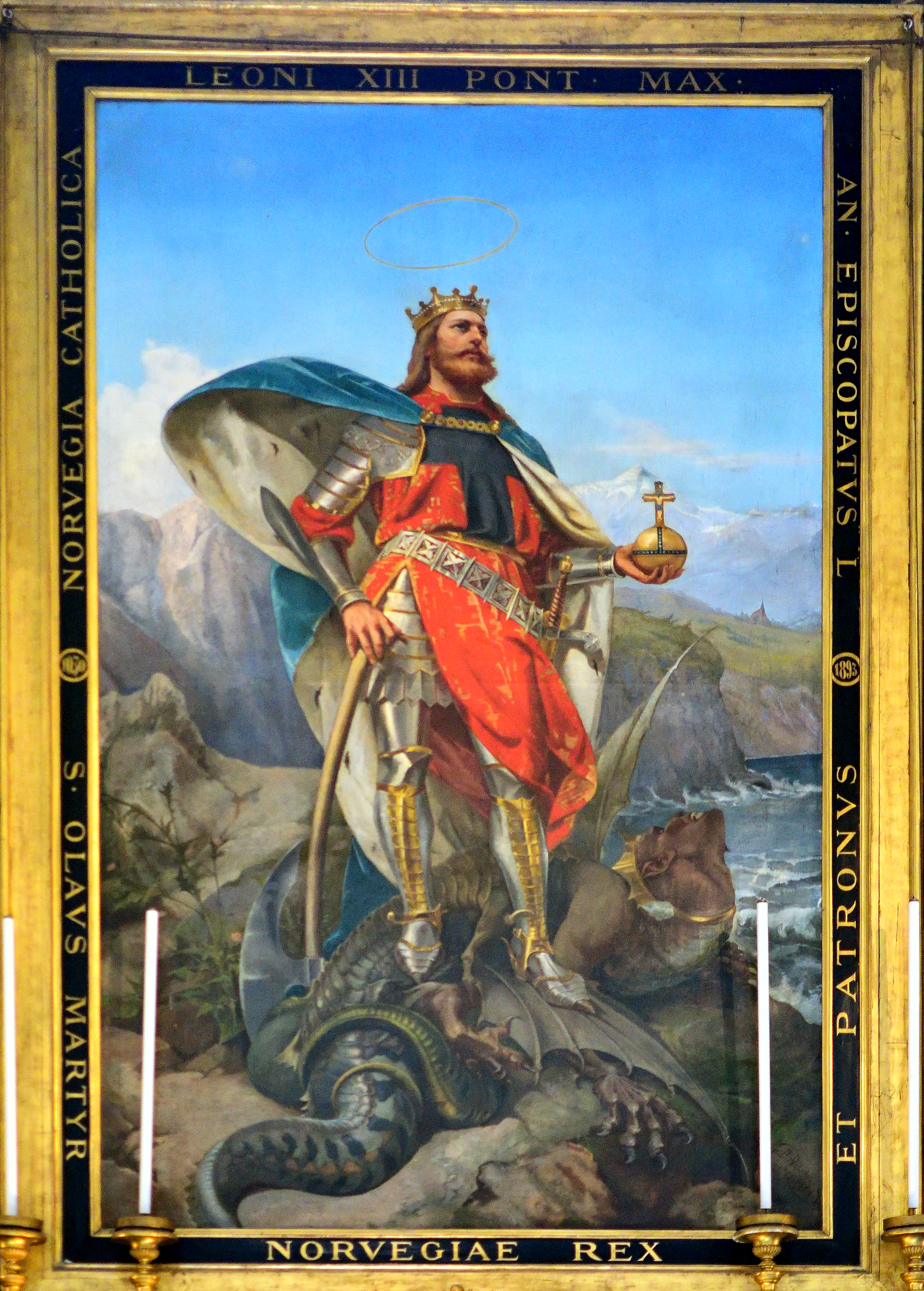
- Saint Olaf of Norway, by Pius Welonsky (1893) in Sant'Ambrogio e Carlo al Corso, Rome

Martyr and Perpetual King of Norway
- Venerated in: Catholic Church; Eastern Orthodox Church; Lutheranism; Anglicanism
- Beatified: 1031 by Grimketel
- Canonized: 1164 by Pope Alexander III
- Major shrine: St. Olav's shrine, Nidaros Cathedral, Trondheim, Norway
- Feast: 29 July
- Attributes: Axe; Crown
- Patronage: Norway, Faroe Islands, Normans

Olaf swiftly became Norway's patron saint; Bishop Grimketel performed his canonisation only a year after his death. (Note: Grimketel initiated the beatification of Olaf on 3 August 1031. This was before the time of the formal canonization process now in use.) The cult of Olaf unified the country and consolidated the Christianisation of Norway. He is also recognized as the patron saint of the Faroe Islands.

Owing to Olaf's later status as Norway's patron saint, and to his importance in later medieval historiography and in Norwegian folklore, it is difficult to assess the historical Olaf's character. Judging from the bare outlines of known historical facts, he appears to have been a fairly unsuccessful ruler, whose power was based on an alliance with the much more powerful King Cnut the Great; who was driven into exile when he claimed power of his own; and whose attempt at a reconquest was swiftly crushed.

This calls for an explanation of the status he gained after his death. Three factors are important: the later myth surrounding his role in the Christianisation of Norway, the various dynastic relationships among the ruling families, and the need for legitimisation in a later period.

=== Conversion of Norway ===
Olaf Haraldsson and Olaf Tryggvason (Olaf Haraldsson's godfather) are both traditionally regarded as the driving forces behind Norway's final conversion to Christianity. But large stone crosses and other Christian symbols suggest that at least Norway's coastal areas were deeply influenced by Christianity long before Olaf's time; with one exception, all of Norway's rulers since Håkon the Good (c. 920–961) were Christians, as was Olaf's main opponent, Cnut the Great. What seems clear is that Olaf made efforts to establish a church organization on a broader scale than before, among other things by importing bishops from England, Normandy and Germany, and that he tried to enforce Christianity in the inland areas, which had the least communication with the rest of Europe, and which economically were more strongly based on agriculture, so that the inclination to hold on to the former fertility cult was stronger than in the more diversified and expansive western parts of Norway.

Many believe Olaf introduced Christian law into Norway in 1024, based upon the Kuli stone, but this stone is hard to interpret. The codification of Christianity as the legal religion of Norway was attributed to Olaf, and his legal arrangements for the Church of Norway had high standing in the eyes of the Norwegian people and clergy. Pope Gregory VII made clerical celibacy binding on the priests of Western Europe in 1074–75. However, Olaf's legal code for the church made no mention of clerical celibacy. Only after Norway was made a metropolitan province with its own archbishop in 1153—making the Norwegian church more independent of its king and more directly responsible to the Pope—did canon law gain a greater prominence in the life and jurisdiction of the Norwegian church.

=== Olaf's dynasty ===
For various reasons, most importantly the death of King Cnut the Great in 1035 but perhaps also a certain discontent among Norwegian nobles with Danish rule in the years after Olaf's death in 1030, Olaf's illegitimate son with the concubine Alvhild, Magnus the Good, assumed power in Norway, and eventually also in Denmark. Numerous Danish churches were dedicated to Olaf during his reign, and the sagas give glimpses of the young king's efforts to promote the cult of his deceased father. This became typical of Scandinavian monarchies. In pagan times, Scandinavian kings derived their right to rule from their claims of descent from the Norse god Odin, or in the case of the kings of the Swedes at Old Uppsala, from Freyr. In Christian times this legitimation of a dynasty's right to rule and its national prestige was based on its descent from a saintly king. Thus the kings of Norway promoted the cult of St. Olaf, the kings of Sweden the cult of St. Erik and the kings of Denmark the cult of St. Canute, just as in England the Norman and Plantagenet kings promoted the cult of St. Edward the Confessor at Westminster Abbey, their coronation church.

=== Saint Olaf ===
==== Liturgical cult ====
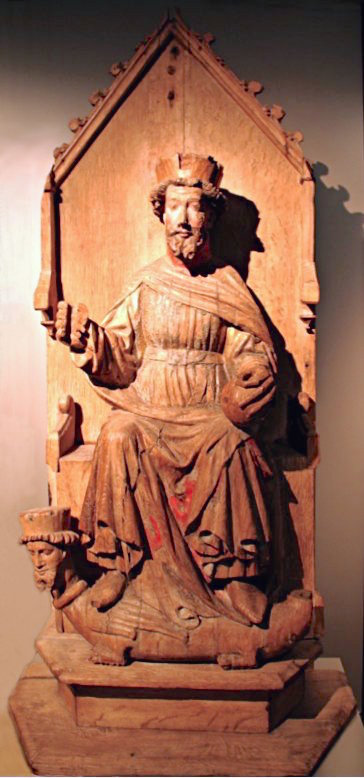
Statue of St. Olav from Austevoll Church, Norway

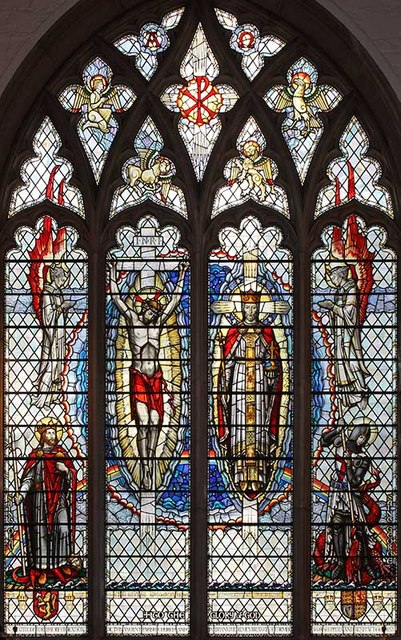
St. Olaf in stained-glass window at St Olave's Church, Hart Street in London

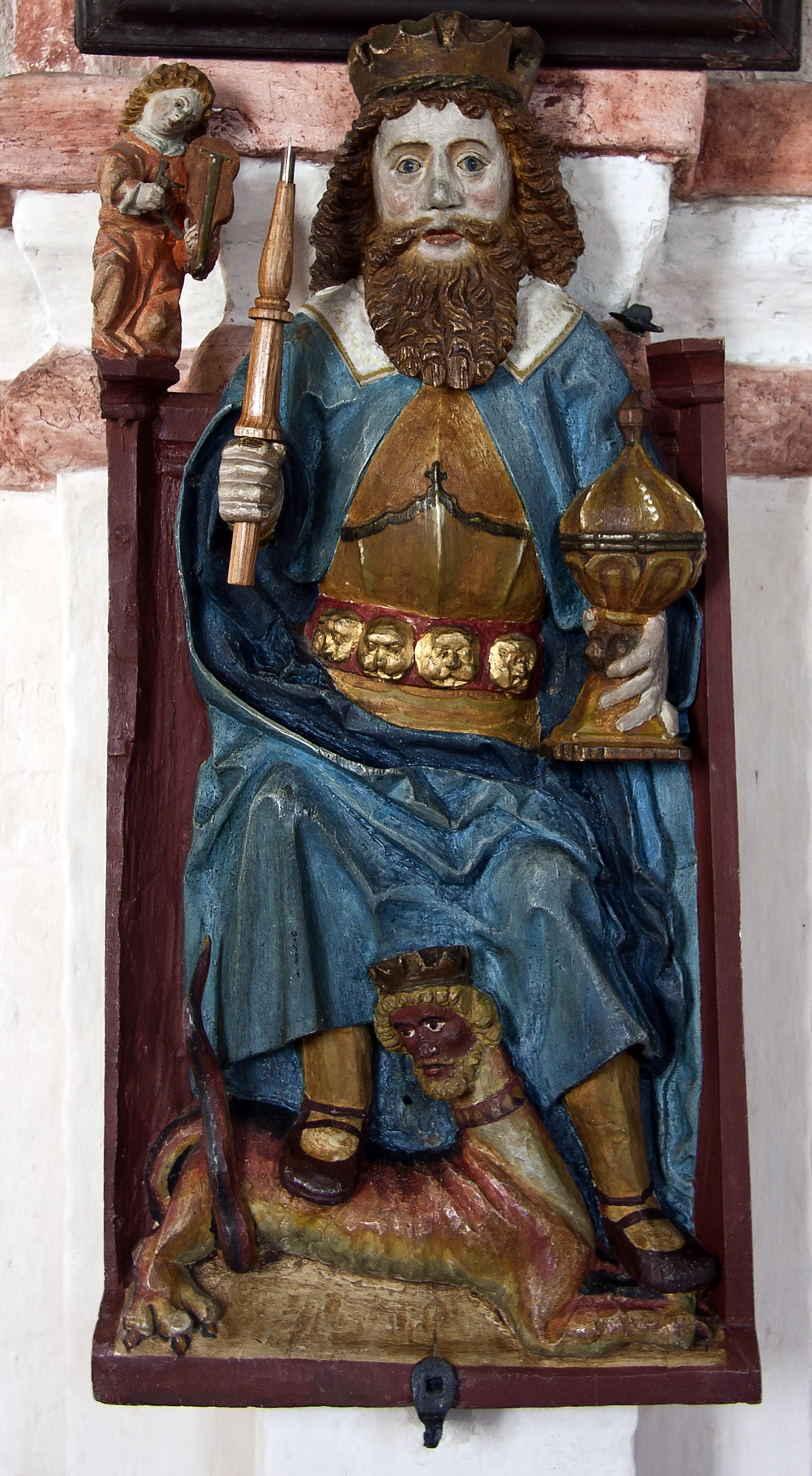
Medieval depictions of Saint Olaf adopted features from Thor. This wooden statue is from Sankt Olofs kyrka in Scania, southern Sweden.

Saint Olaf in the coat of arms of Ulvila, a medieval town in Satakunta, Finland

Sigrid Undset noted that Olaf was baptised in Rouen, the capital of Normandy, and suggested that Olaf may have used priests of Norman descent for his missionaries. Normans were somewhat familiar with the culture of the people they were to convert and in some cases may have been able to understand the language. Among the bishops Olaf is known to have brought with him from England was Grimketel (Latin: Grimcillus). He was probably the only one of the missionary bishops left in the country at the time of Olaf's death, and he stood behind the translation and beatification of Olaf on 3 August 1031. Grimketel later became the first bishop of Sigtuna in Sweden.

At this time, local bishops and their people recognised and proclaimed a person a saint, and a formal canonisation procedure through the papal curia was not customary; in Olaf's case, this did not happen until 1888. But Olaf II died before the East-West Schism and a strict Roman Rite was not well-established in Scandinavia at the time. He is also venerated in the Eastern Orthodox Church.

Grimketel was later appointed bishop in the diocese of Selsey in southeastern England. This is probably why the earliest traces of a liturgical cult of Olaf are found in England. An office, or prayer service, for Olaf is found in the so-called Leofric collectar (c. 1050), which Bishop Leofric of Exeter bequeathed in his last will and testament to Exeter Cathedral. This English cult seems to have been short-lived.

Writing around 1070, Adam of Bremen mentions pilgrimage to St. Olaf's shrine in Nidaros, but this is the only firm trace we have of a cult of St. Olaf in Norway before the mid-12th century. By this time he was also being called Norway's Eternal King. In 1152/3, Nidaros was separated from Lund as the archbishopric of Nidaros. It is likely that whatever formal or informal veneration of Olaf as a saint may have existed in Nidaros before that was emphasised and formalised on this occasion.

Miracles performed by St. Olaf appear for the first time in Þórarinn loftunga's skaldic poem Glælognskviða, or "Sea-Calm Poem", from about 1030–1034. One is the killing and throwing onto a mountain of a sea serpent still visible on the cliffside. Another took place on the day of his death, when a blind man regained his sight after rubbing his eyes with hands stained with Olaf's blood.

The texts used for the liturgical celebration of St. Olaf during most of the Middle Ages were probably compiled or written by Eystein Erlendsson, the second Archbishop of Nidaros (1161–1189). (Note: Eysteinn Erlendsson is commonly believed to have written Et Miracula Beati Olaui. This Latin hagiographical work is about the history and work of St. Olaf, with particular emphasis on his missionary work.) The nine miracles reported in Glælognskviða form the core of the catalogue of miracles in this office.

St. Olaf was widely popular throughout Scandinavia. Numerous churches in Norway, Sweden, and Iceland were dedicated to him. His presence was even felt in Finland and many travelled from all over the Norse world in order to visit his shrine. Apart from the early traces of a cult in England, there are only scattered references to him outside the Nordic area.

Several churches in England were dedicated to him (often as St Olave); the name was presumably popular with Scandinavian immigrants. St Olave's Church, York, is referred to in the Anglo-Saxon Chronicle for 1055 as the place of burial of its founder, Earl Siward. This is generally accepted to be the earliest datable church foundation dedicated to Olaf and is further evidence of a cult of St. Olaf in the early 1050s in England. St Olave Hart Street in the City of London is the burial place of Samuel Pepys and his wife. Another St. Olave's Church south of London Bridge gave its name to Tooley Street and to the St Olave's Poor Law Union, later the Metropolitan Borough of Bermondsey: its workhouse in Rotherhithe became St Olave's Hospital and then an old people's home a few hundred metres from St Olav's Church, which is the Norwegian Church in London. It also led to the naming of St Olave's Grammar School, which was established in 1571 and was in Tooley Street until 1968, when it moved to Orpington, Kent; St Saviour's and St Olave's Church of England School on the New Kent Road in London was historically connected. The village of St Olaves in Norfolk bears the name as it is the location of the remains of a 13th-century Augustinian priory dedicated to Olaf.

St. Olaf was also, together with the Mother of God, the patron saint of the chapel of the Varangians, the Scandinavian warriors who served as the bodyguard of the Byzantine emperor. This church is believed to have been near the church of Hagia Irene in Constantinople. The icon of the Madonna Nicopeia, presently in St. Mark's Basilica in Venice, which is believed to have been traditionally carried into combat by the Byzantine military forces, is believed to have been kept in this chapel in times of peace. Thus St. Olaf was also the last saint venerated by both the Western and Eastern churches before the Great Schism.

The basilica of Sant'Ambrogio e Carlo al Corso in Rome has a Chapel of St. Olav. Its altarpiece contains a painting of the saint, shown as a martyr king defeating a dragon, representing victory over his pagan past. It was originally a gift presented to Pope Leo XIII in 1893 for the golden jubilee of his ordination as a bishop by Norwegian nobleman and papal chamberlain Baron Wilhelm Wedel-Jarlsberg. The chapel was restored in 1980 and reinaugurated by Bishop John Willem Gran, bishop of the Roman Catholic Diocese of Oslo.

In Germany, there used to be a shrine of St. Olaf in Koblenz. It was founded in 1463 or 1464 by Heinrich Kalteisen at his retirement home, the Dominican Monastery in the Altstadt ("Old City") neighborhood of Koblenz. He was the Archbishop of Nidaros in Norway from 1452 to 1458. When he died in 1464, he was buried in front of the shrine's altar. However, the shrine did not last: the Dominican Monastery was secularized in 1802 and bulldozed in 1955. Only the Rokokoportal ("Rococo Portal"), built in 1754, remains to mark the spot.

In the Faroe Islands, the day of St. Olaf's death is celebrated as Ólavsøka, a nation-wide holiday.

Recently the pilgrimage route to Nidaros Cathedral, the site of St. Olaf's tomb, has been reinstated. The route is known as The Pilgrim's Way (Pilegrimsleden). The main route, approximately 640 km long, starts in the ancient part of Oslo and heads north, along Lake Mjosa, up the Gudbrandsdal Valley, over Dovrefjell and down the Orkdalen Valley, ending at Nidaros Cathedral in Trondheim. A Pilgrim's Office in Oslo gives advice to pilgrims, and a Pilgrim Centre in Trondheim, under the aegis of the Cathedral, awards certificates to pilgrims when they complete their journeys. However, the relics are no longer exposed in the cathedral, and it is not sure where exactly in the cathedral crypt his remains are buried.

On 6 March 2026, a public initiative in the form of a petition titled Olaf: 2030 was created by Evan Walser advocating for the archaeological investigation of a possible grave discovered under the floor in the eastern octagon chapel of Nidaros Cathedral where Olaf's body may have been moved in the 16th century. The petition received an endorsement from French paleopathologist Dr. Philippe Charlier on 29 April 2026.

==== Folklore ====
For centuries, Olaf figured in folk traditions as a slayer of trolls and giants, and as a protector against malicious forces. He was said to have healing power, which attracted people to his shrine, and various springs were claimed to have sprung forth where he or his body had been. Around the 12th century, folk traditions and iconography of Olaf absorbed elements of the gods Thor and Freyr from Norse mythology. Like Freyr, he became associated with fertility, which led to his adoption as a patron saint by farmers, fishermen, sailors and merchants of the Hanseatic League, who turned to him for good yield and protection. From Thor, he inherited the quick temper, physical strength and merits of a giant-slayer.

Popular tradition also made marks in the ecclesiastical material. Early depictions of Olaf portray him as clean-shaven, but after 1200 he appears with a red beard, which may have been absorbed from Thor. The Passio a miracule beati Olavi, the official record of Olaf's miracles, contains an episode where Olaf helps a man escape from the huldrefolk, the "hidden people" of Norwegian folklore.

==== In Normandy ====
In Normandy, Saint Olaf represents an important figure and was chosen unofficially as the patron saint of the Normans, this term mainly designating the inhabitants of continental Normandy and of the Channel Islands, but also on a larger scale the inhabitants of the former Viking territories, namely the Scandinavian countries and, even more so, Norway. This choice can be explained by the time in which Olaf lived and when the exchanges between Normandy and the Scandinavian countries were common. There were also many kinships between the inhabitants of the brand new Norman state, as illustrated by the choice of Archbishop Robert II for the baptism of Olaf.

The normand flag with a Scandinavian cross, which recalls the Scandinavian origins of Normandy, has been baptized "Cross of Saint Olav" (or "Cross of Saint Olaf") in honor of the saint.

A church in Rouen is dedicated to Saint-Olaf, who was baptized there by the brother of a Duke of Normandy. The Norwegian Saint-Olaf Church was built in 1926, rue Duguay-Trouin, near the home of the Scandinavian sailors. The Norwegian Seamen's Mission wanted to build a Lutheran place of worship for visiting sailors.

A bone from Saint Olaf's arm is kept as a relic in the crypt of Rouen Cathedral.

In 2014 the city and the diocese of Rouen celebrated the millennium of the baptism of Saint Olav with the Norwegian representatives of the Catholic Church and the Evangelical Lutheran Church of Norway.

In Normandy, July 29 is the occasion of local cultural festivals which generally highlight the Norse heritage of Normandy. In some Norman parishes, Mass is celebrated on this day in honor of the saint and to mark the historical links that unite Normandy and Scandinavia.

==== In Epcot ====
A statue of a young Olaf Haraldsson can be found erected in front of the Stave Church replica in the Norway Pavilion in Walt Disney World's Epcot.

==== Other references to St. Olaf ====
Saint Olaf in the coat of arms of Jomala, Åland

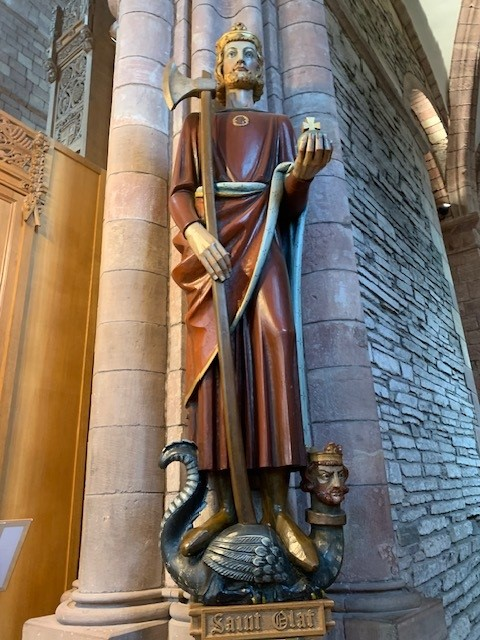
- Saint Olaf in Orkney Cathedral, Kirkwall, Scotland
  St. Olav's Cathedral, Oslo, the main cathedral of the Roman Catholic Church in Norway
- St. Olav's Chapel, in Covarrubias, Spain
- Olavshallen Concert Hall in Trondheim
- St. Olaf's Church, Balestrand in Sogn og Fjordane, Norway
- Sankt Olof situated in Simrishamn Municipality, Skåne County, Sweden
- St. Oluf's Church, now St. Oluf's Cemetery in Aarhus, Denmark, originates from before 1203, but has been in ruins since 1548.
- St. Olaf's Church in Jomala, Åland
- St. Olaf's Church, the tallest and possibly oldest church in Tallinn, Estonia
- St. Olaf's Church in Nõva, Estonia
- St. Olaf's Church in Vormsi, Estonia
- St. Olaf's Church ruins in Väike-Pakri, Estonia
- St. Olaf's Chapel ruins in Suur-Pakri, Estonia
- Saint Olav's Church in Kirkjubøur, Faroe Islands
- St. Olaf's Church, Tyrvää in Sastamala, Finland
- St. Olaf's Castle (Olavinlinna) in Savonlinna, Finland
- St. Olaf College was founded by Norwegian-American immigrant Bernt Julius Muus in Northfield, Minnesota during 1874.
- Saint Olaf Catholic Church in downtown Minneapolis
- Saint Olaf Catholic Church in Norge, Virginia
- Saint Olaf Catholic Church and School in Bountiful, UT
- St. Olave's Anglican Church, Toronto, ON, Canada
- The primary school and GAA club in Balally, Dublin, Ireland, both named for St. Olaf
- Tower of St. Olav, the only remaining tower of Vyborg Castle
- The coat of arms of the Church of Norway contains two axes, the instruments of St. Olaf's martyrdom.
- The oldest picture of St. Olaf is painted on a column in the Church of the Nativity in Bethlehem.
- The Royal Norwegian Order of St. Olav was founded in 1847 by Oscar I, king of Norway and Sweden, in memory of the king.
- T.S.C. Sint Olof, a Dutch student organisation with St. Olaf as its patron.
- St Olaf St a secondary street in Lerwick, Shetland
- St Olaf is a character in the Norwegian TV series Beforeigners.
- St Olaf’s Church in Wasdale which is England’s smallest parish church.
- St Olaf Hotel in Cruden Bay, Scotland (near site of 1012 battle)

== See also ==
- Oldest Saga of St. Olaf
- Legendary Saga of St. Olaf
- Separate Saga of St. Olaf
- Óláfs saga helga
- Rauðúlfs þáttr, short allegorical story involving St. Olaf
- The Saint Olav Drama
- Olavsund in Ny-Hellesund
- Helmet and spurs of Saint Olaf
- Shrine of Manchan, with early representation of St. Olaf

== Notes ==
Olaf the Saint Vestfold branch Cadet branch of the Fairhair dynasty Born: 995 Died: July 29 1030
Regnal titles
Vacant Regency held by Sveinn Hákonarson & Hákon Eiríksson Title last held by Sweyn Forkbeard	King of Norway; 1015–1028	Vacant Regency held by Hákon Eiríksson Title next held by Cnut the Great
