= Eysteinn Erlendsson =

Archbishop of Nidaros (1120–1188)

Saint Eysteinn Erlendsson
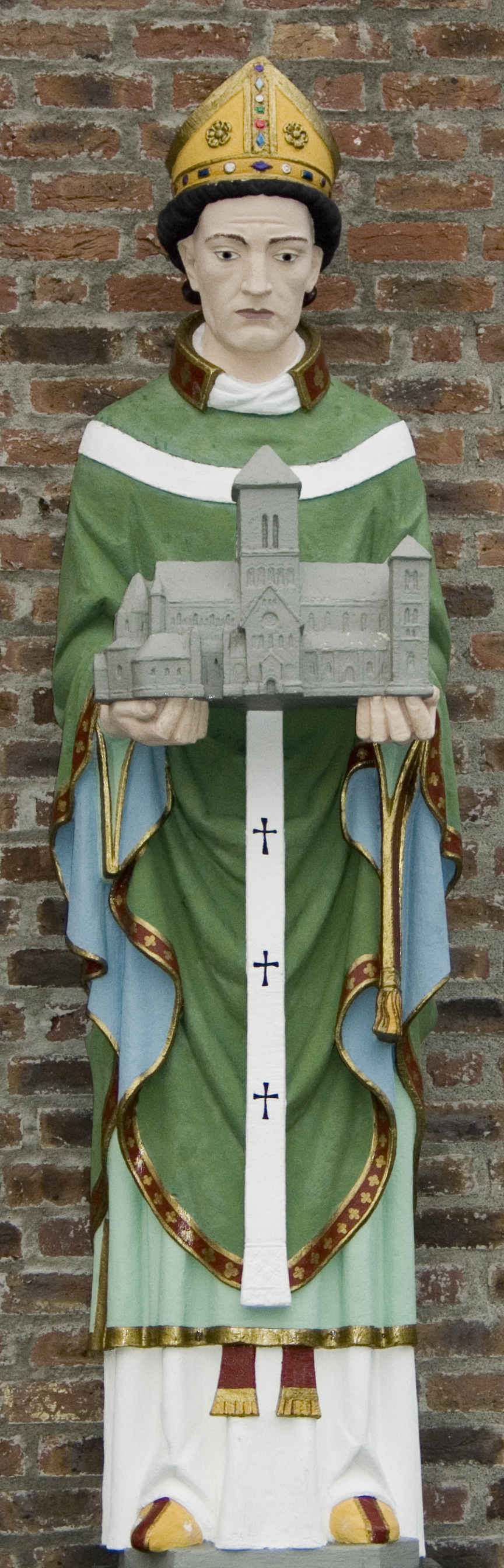
- St. Øystein, Archbishop of Nidaros

Archbishop of Nidaros
- Died: 26 January 1188
- Venerated in: Catholic Church
- Feast: 26 January

Eysteinn Erlendsson (Norwegian: Øystein Erlendsson, Latin: Augustinus Nidrosiensis; died 26 January 1188) was Archbishop of Nidaros from 1161 to his death in 1188.

== Background ==
His family came from Trøndelag, and he was related to most of the local nobility. His birth date and place of birth is not recorded. Eysteinn was probably born sometime between 1120 and 1130 on the farm or Råsvoll north of Trondheim in the Verdalen valley . His father was known as Erlend Himalde. He was the grandson of Tørberg Arnesson (died c. 1050), who served as an advisor to several Norwegian kings and the great-grandson of Ulv Uspaksson (died 1066), who was a councilman under King Harald Hardrada.

He was educated at Saint-Victor, in Paris. As a priest he served as steward to King Inge Krokrygg of Norway. When Archbishop Jon Birgersson died 24 February 1157, King Inge appointed Eysteinn as the new archbishop.

== Ties with Rome ==
Eysteinn then travelled to Rome, where his appointment was confirmed by Pope Alexander III in 1161. He returned to Norway in 1161 and attempted to strengthen the ties between Rome and the Norwegian Church. He established the communities of Augustinian canons regular and consecrated Saint Thorlak.

== Involvement in civil war ==
King Inge's reign fell within the start of the period known as the civil war era in Norway. Before Eysteinn could return to his seat, King Inge was killed by his nephew, Håkon Herdebrei. King Inge's supporters had rallied under the leadership of Erling Skakke with his son Magnus as candidate for king. Erling Skakke was married to Kristin, daughter of King Sigurd Jorsalfar. This was the first time the throne had passed to someone who was not a king's son.

Håkon Herdebrei was defeated and slain in 1162; however, the possibility remained that another claimant would appear. In this situation, Bishop Eysteinn and Erling became natural allies. The Catholic Church had long wished to reform the Norwegian kingdom on a more European model. Especially it wanted an end to the tradition of having several co-kings, which in the past had often led to war and unrest. In addition Bishop Eysteinn wanted only legitimate sons to be eligible. By sponsoring Magnus Erlingsson, both these goals would be achieved. In 1163 the new law of succession (agnatisk suksesjon) was introduced. In return, Bishop Eysteinn crowned Magnus King of Norway. This was the first time such a ceremony had taken place in Norway.

Eysteinn is thought to have written Passio Olavi, a hagiographical work written in Latin about the history and work of St. Olaf II of Norway, with particular emphasis on his missionary work. The title is an abbreviation for Passio Et Miracula Beati Olaui (Holy Olav's sufferings and miracles).

== Veneration ==
Eysteinn is recognised as a saint in the Catholic Church and is commemorated in the most recent edition of the Roman Martyrology under the date of 27 January. The Martyrology entry (elogium) reads "At Nidros in Norway, Saint Augustine (Eystein) Erlandssön, bishop, who defended the Church committed to his care against princes and built it up with the greatest determination."

== Other sources ==
- Gunnes, Erik Erkebiskop Øystein, statsmann og kirkebygger (Oslo: 1996) ISBN 82-03-22144-0
- Vandvik, Eirik Erkebiskop Eystein som politikar (Trondheim: 1961)
- Bagge, Sverre Mennesket i middelalderens Norge (forlaget Aschehoug, Oslo: 2005) ISBN 82-03-23282-5
