= Olsok =

Nordic day of celebration

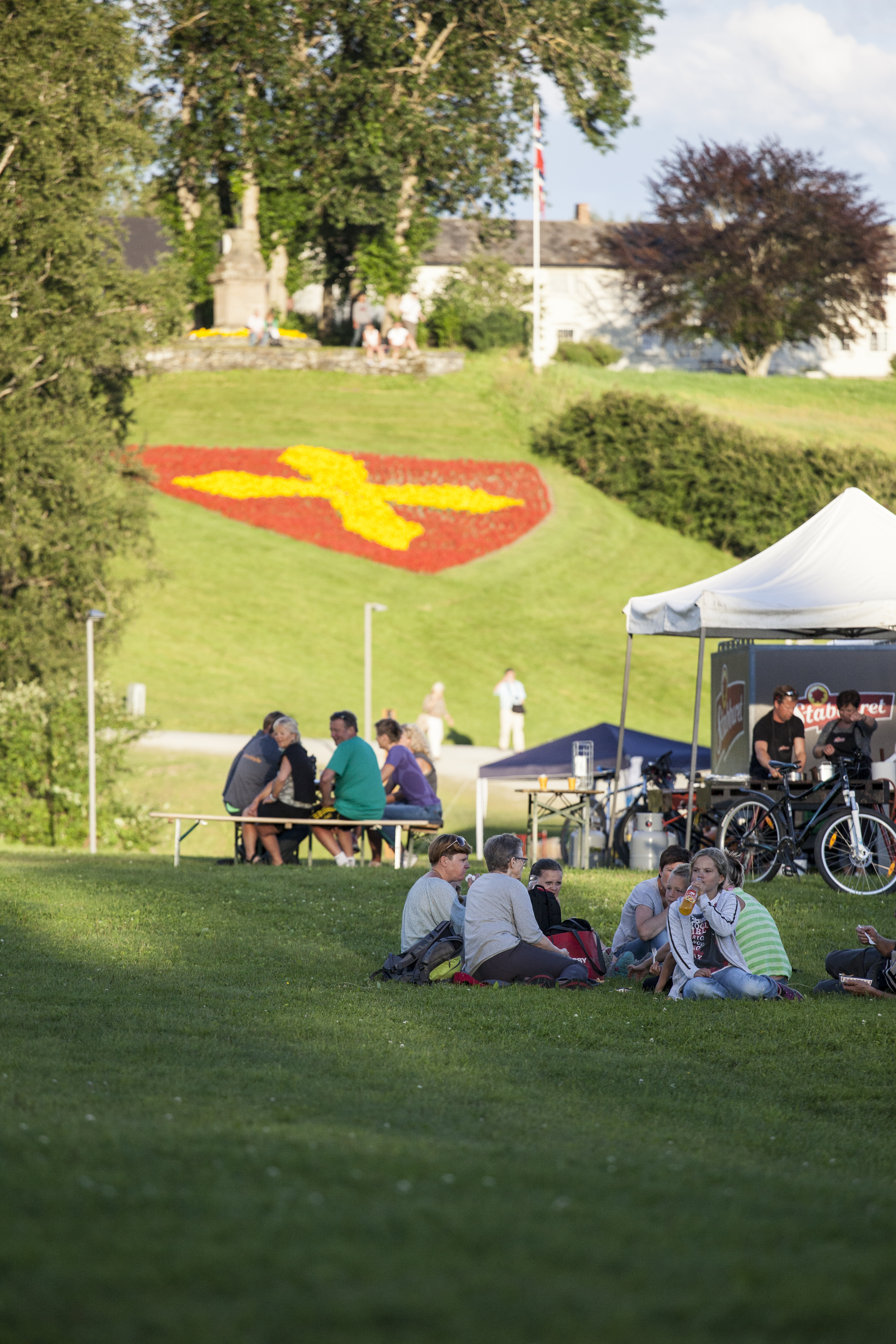
The cross of flowers – the armorial of Verdal Municipality – at Stiklestad during Olsok in July 2013.

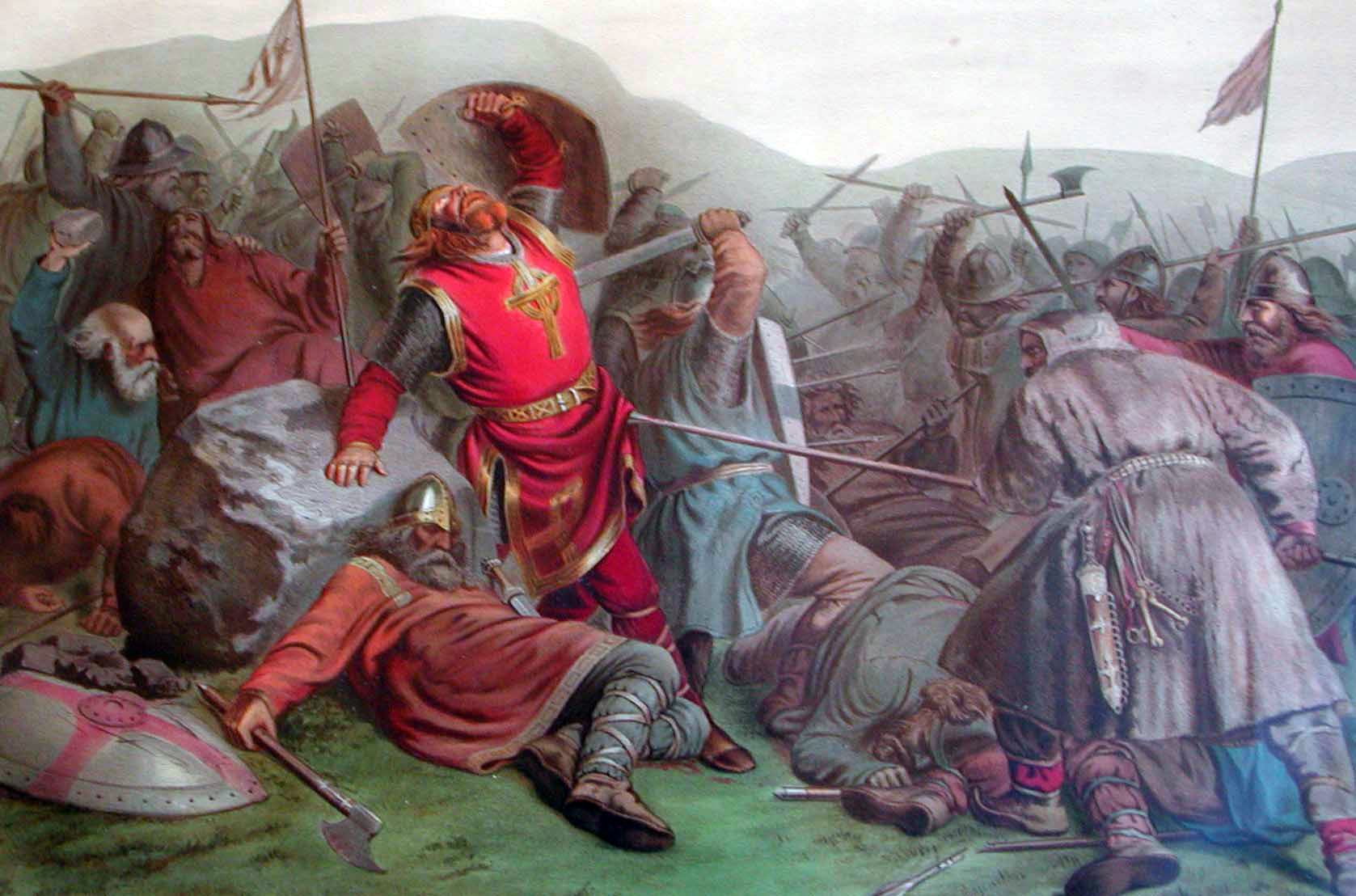
Olav den hellige stumps at the Battle of Stiklestad.

Olsok (lit. 'Olaf's Wake' or 'Olaf's Vigil') is a national day of celebration on July 29 in the Nordic countries of Norway and the Faroe Islands, and also in the provinces of Härjedalen in Sweden and Savonlinna in Finland.

== Background ==
King Olaf II Haraldsson of Norway is remembered as Rex perpetuus Norvegiae, the Eternal King of Norway. July 29 is traditionally the date of the death of King Olaf at the Battle of Stiklestad, north of Nidaros (Trondheim), Norway, in 1030. King Olaf's martyrdom at Stiklestad appears to have contributed decisively to establishing Christianity throughout the nation of Norway. King Olaf was subsequently canonized in Nidaros on 3 August 1031 following efforts principally of north Bishop Grimkell.

Until the Lutheran Reformation in the 16th century, Olsok was a major church feast in the Nordic countries. The late 19th and the early 20th century saw a renewed interest in Olsok, particularly in Norway. The Roman Catholic Church in Norway recognizes Olsok as a major feast all over the country, while the Lutheran Church of Norway recognizes the day principally in Nidaros Cathedral as well as other churches. Starting with the 900th anniversary of Stiklestad in 1930, July 29 has been an official flag day (Olsokdagen) in Norway. Since 1954, The Saint Olav Drama has been performed at Stiklestad each year.

In the Faroe Islands, Ólavsøka is also recognized on July 29. Ólavsøka is the biggest summer festival in the Faroe Islands and is commonly celebrated over a several day period. This tradition dates from when the islands were part of Norway during the Middle Ages. Within Sweden Olofsmässa ("Olaf's Mass") is recognized principally within the former Norwegian province of Härjedalen.

Within Finland, Pyhän Olavin Päivä ("St. Olaf's Day") is celebrated principally at Savonlinna, site of Olavinlinna ("Olof's Castle"), since St. Olaf is the patron saint of the site.

== Other sources ==
- DuBois, Thomas Sanctity in the North: Saints, Lives, and Cults in Medieval Scandinavia (Toronto, 2008) ISBN 978-0802091307
- Lynch, Joseph The Medieval Church: A Brief History (Routledge, 1992) ISBN 978-0582494671
- Myklebust, Morten Olaf Viking & Saint (Norwegian Council for Cultural Affairs, 1997) ISBN 978-82-7876-004-8
- Winroth, Anders The Conversion of Scandinavia: Vikings, Merchants, and Missionaries in the Remaking of Northern Europe (Yale University Press, 2014) ISBN 978-0300205534
- Pulsiano, Phillip (ed), Kirsten Wolf (ed) (1993) Medieval Scandinavia: An Encyclopedia (Routledge, Taylor & Francis Group) ISBN 978-0824047870
