= Legendary Saga of St. Olaf =

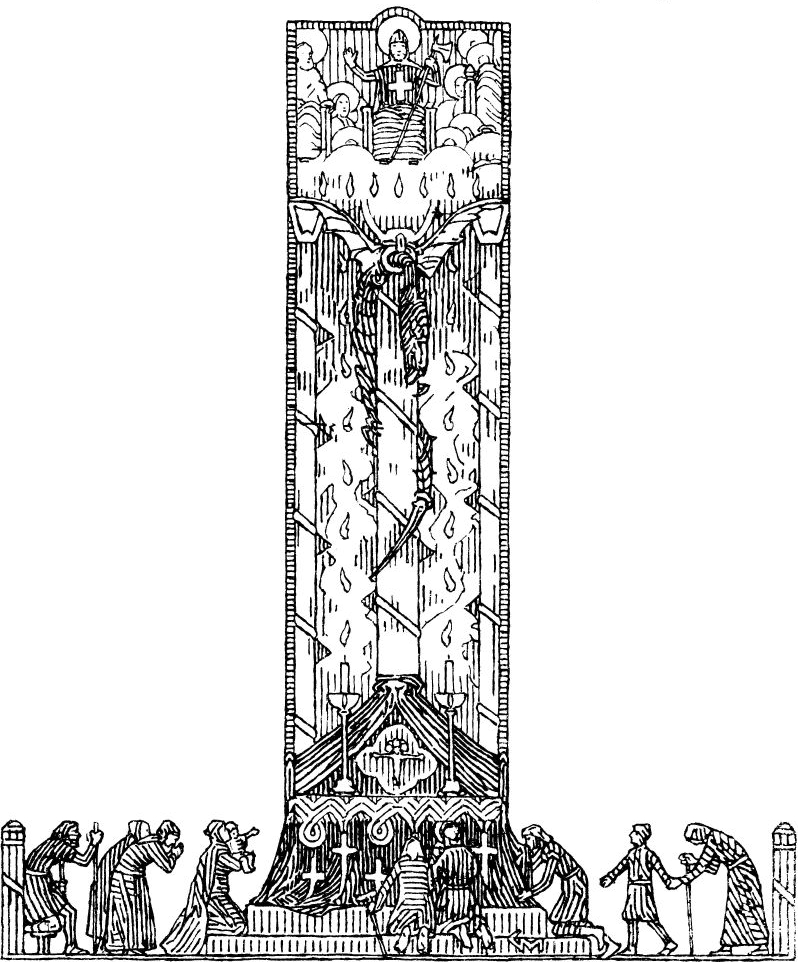
Gerhard Munthe: Illustration for the saga of St. Olav, Heimskringla 1899 edition. Vignette

The Legendary Saga of St. Olaf or Helgisaga Óláfs konungs Haraldssonar is one of the kings' sagas, a 13th-century biography of the 11th-century Saint Olaf II of Norway. It is based heavily on the largely lost Oldest Saga of St. Olaf. The composition is primitive and clumsy and the saga essentially consists of a series of separate anecdotes extracted from skaldic verse. The anonymous author may have been a Norwegian and the saga is preserved in one mid-13th-century Norwegian manuscript. It is thought to have been composed in the early 13th century. Snorri Sturluson is believed to have used a work closely similar to the Legendary Saga when he composed his Separate Saga of St. Olaf and Heimskringla.

== See also ==
- The Saint Olav Drama
