= Separate Saga of St. Olaf =

Norwegian kings' saga

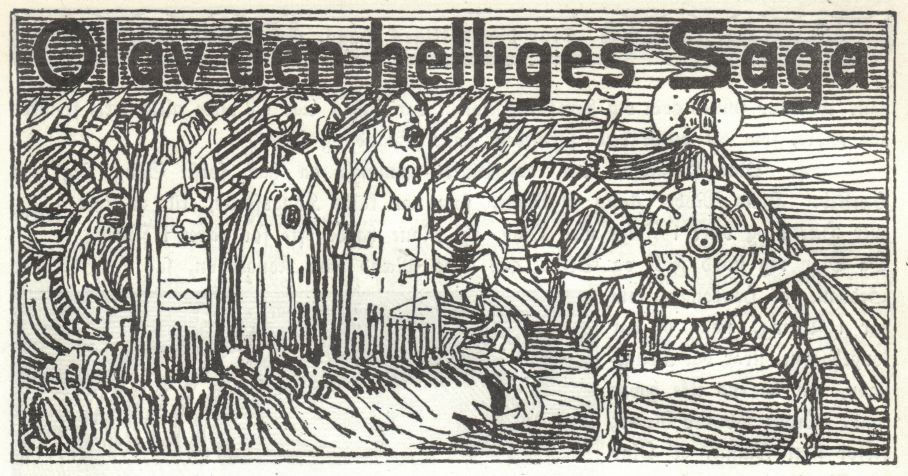
Illustration for Olav den helliges saga Heimskringla Gerhard Munthe: 1899

The Separate (or Independent) Saga of St. Olaf (Old Norse: Óláfs saga helga in sérstaka) is one of the kings' sagas. It was written about King Olaf II of Norway (Olaf Haraldsson), later Saint Olaf (Olav den Hellige), patron saint of Norway.

== History ==
It was written in c. 1225 by Snorri Sturluson, who made use of the saga by the priest Styrmir Kárason, now largely lost except for some fragments in Flateyjarbók. A revised version of the Separate Saga was later incorporated into the Heimskringla (c. 1230), often ascribed to Snorri Sturluson.

Like many other kings' sagas, the work cites skaldic poems for historical verification or literary embroidery. The work is also valuable for being preceded by two prologues. The principal witness of the text is MS nr. 2 4° in the National Library of Sweden (Kungliga biblioteket), Stockholm.

In the longer prologue, Snorri Sturluson expounds on the historical value of skaldic poetry:

En þó þykki mér þat merkiligast til sannenda, er berum orðum er sagt í kvæðum eða öðrum kveðskap, þeim er svá var ort um konunga eða aðra höfðingja, at þeir sjálfir heyrðu, eða í erfikvæðum þeim, er skáldin fœrðu sonum þeira. Þau orð, er í kveðskap standa, eru in sömu sem í fyrstu váru, ef rétt er kveðit, þótt at hverr maðr hafi síðan numit af öðrum, ok má þvi ekki breyta.
"And yet I find that most important for veracity, which is said straightforwardly in poems or other poetry that was composed about kings or other chieftains so that they themselves heard it, or in those commemorative poems which the skalds brought to their sons. Those words which stand in poetry are the same as they were in the beginning, if the recitation is correct, although each person has since learned it from another and for that reason nothing can be distorted."

== Editions ==
- Bjarni Aðalbjarnarson (ed.). Heimskringla. 3 vols.: vol. 2. Íslenzk fornrit 26–8. Reykjavík: Hið íslenzka fornritafélag, 1941–51. Appendix: Ór Óláfs sögu ins Helga inni Sérstöku. Critical edition.
- Johnsen, Oscar Albert and Jón Helgason (eds.). Saga Óláfs konungs hins helga. Den store saga om Olav den hellige, eftir Pergamenthåndskrift i Kungliga Biblioteket i Stockholm nr. 2 4to med varianter fra andre håndskrifter. 2 vols. Oslo: Jacob Dybwad, 1930–33. Diplomatic edition of the text found in MS Stockholm nr. 2 4to.
- Munch and Unger, Saga Olafs konungs ens Helga. Christiania, 1853.

== See also ==
- Other versions of the king's saga
- The Saint Olav Drama

== Other sources ==
- Finlay, Alison. Fagrskinna, a Catalogue of the Kings of Norway (Leiden: Brill, 2004)
- Gade, Kari Ellen. "Poetry and its changing importance in medieval Icelandic culture." In Old Icelandic Literature and Society, ed. Margaret Clunies Ross. Cambridge Studies in Medieval Literature 42. (Cambridge: Cambridge University Press, 2000)
