= Heimskringla =

c. 1230 Old Norwegian kings' sagas

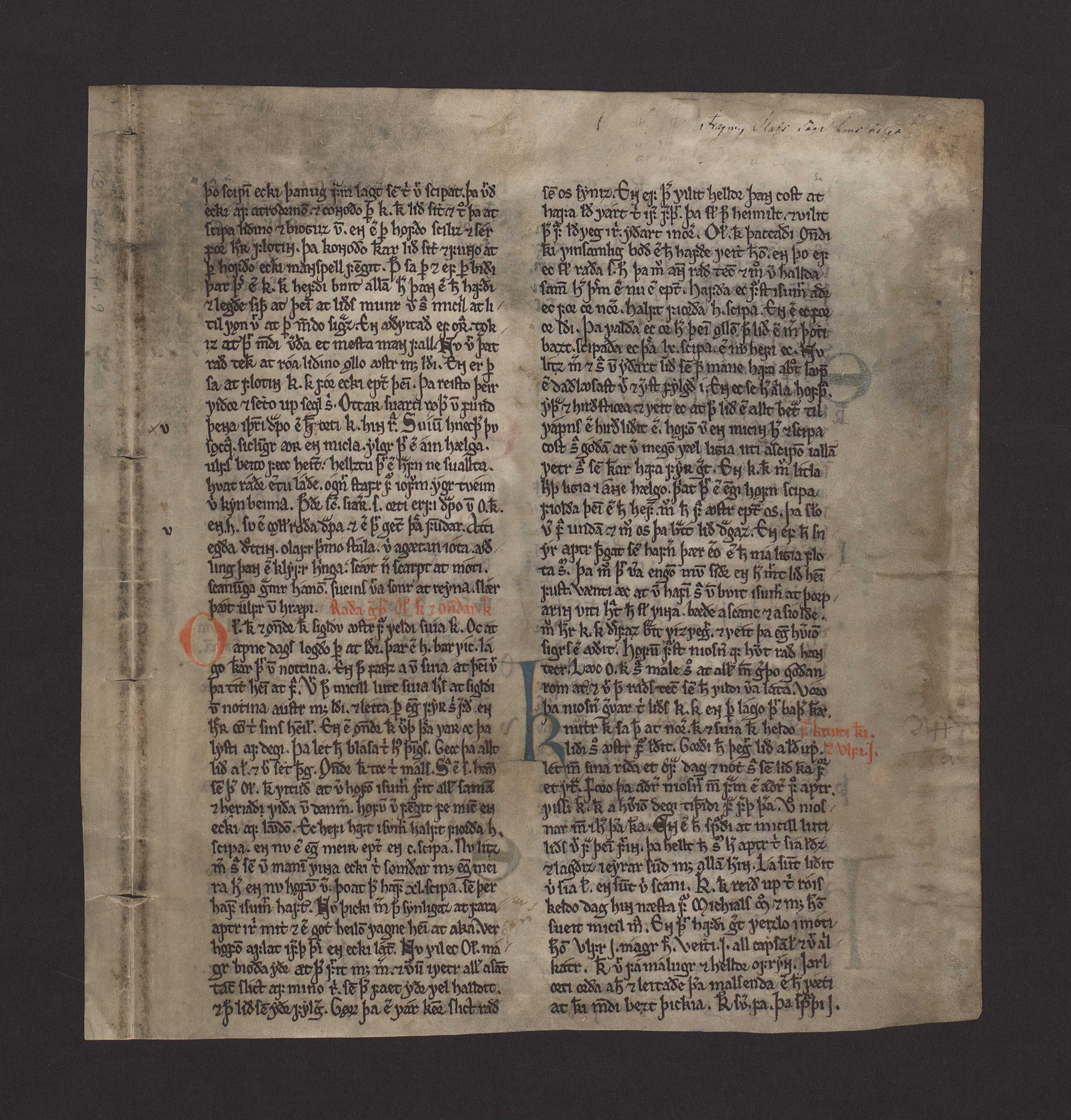
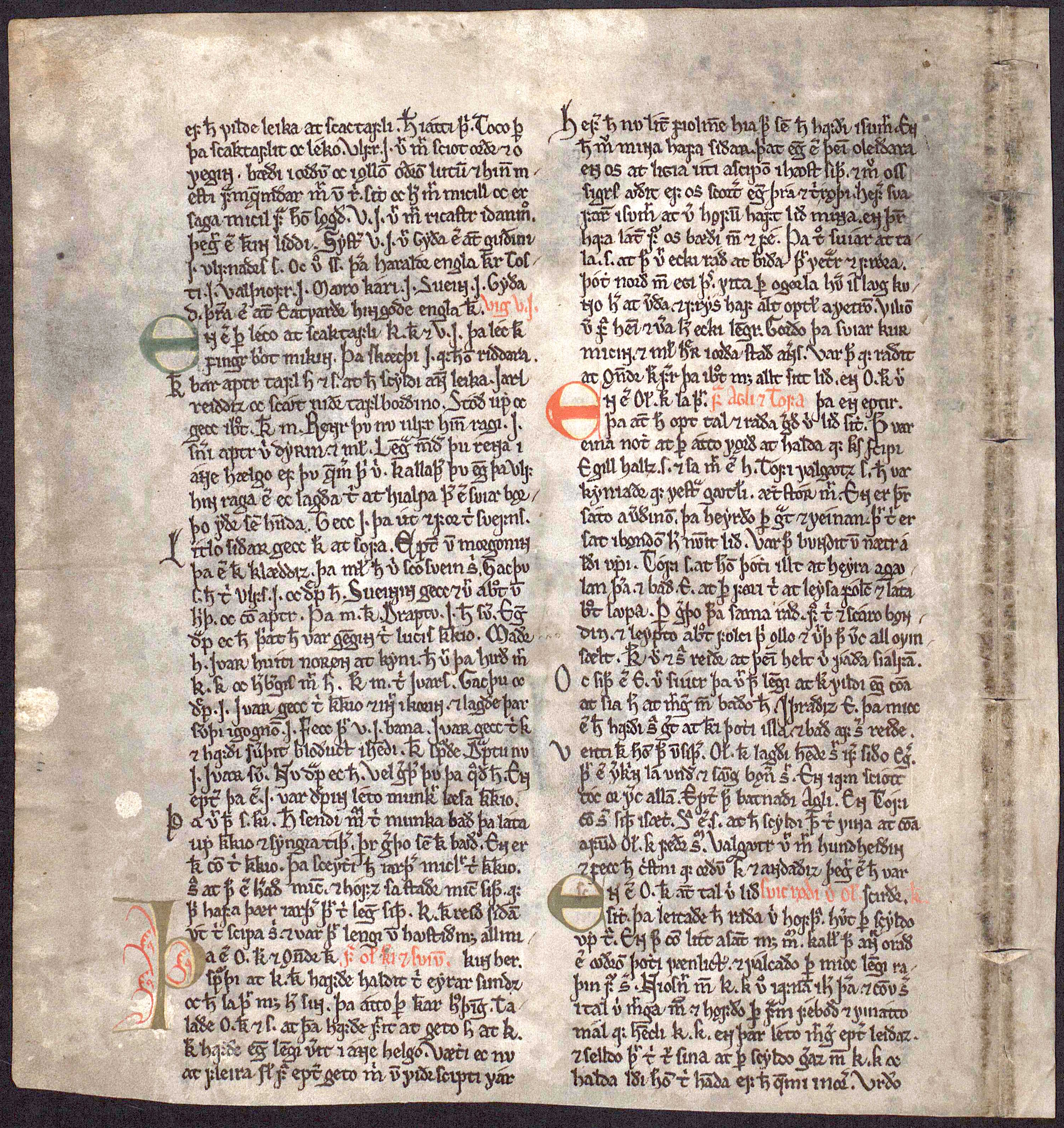
The single surviving page of the c. 1260 Kringla manuscript, known as the Kringla leaf (Kringlublaðið) is kept in the National and University Library of Iceland in Reykjavík.

Heimskringla (Icelandic pronunciation: [ˈheimsˌkʰriŋla]) is the best known of the Old Norwegian kings' sagas. It was written in Old Norse in Iceland. While authorship of Heimskringla is nowhere attributed, some scholars assume it is written by the Icelandic knight, poet and historian, Snorri Sturluson (1178/79–1241) c. 1230. The title Heimskringla was first used in the 17th century, derived from the first two words of one of the manuscripts (kringla heimsins, "the circle of the world").

Heimskringla is a collection of sagas about Swedish and Norwegian kings, beginning with the saga of the legendary Swedish-Norwegian dynasty of the Ynglings, followed by accounts of historical Norwegian rulers from Harald Fairhair of the 9th century up to the death of the pretender Eystein Meyla in 1177.

Some of the exact sources of Heimskringla are disputed, but they include earlier kings' sagas, such as Morkinskinna, Fagrskinna and the 12th-century Norwegian synoptic histories and oral traditions, notably many skaldic poems. The author or authors explicitly name the now lost work Hryggjarstykki as their source for the events of the mid-12th century.

== Authorship ==
No known manuscript attributes authorship to Heimskringla. The matter is summarized as follows by Anthony Faulkes:

The authorship of Heimskringla is not referred to within the text or in any surviving manuscript—as is usually the case for a medieval work—and its attribution to Snorri has been questioned. The first surviving works in which he is credited as author are the sixteenth-century translations of Heimskringla into Danish by the Norwegians Peder Claussøn Friis and Laurents Hanssøn ... who are generally believed to have used at least one now lost manuscript of Heimskringla that gave authority for their naming of Snorri.

== Title ==
The title Heimskringla comes from the first words of the first saga in the compilation (Ynglinga saga), Kringla heimsins, "the orb of the Earth".

== Manuscript history ==
The earliest parchment copy of the work is Kringla, now in the National and University Library of Iceland, catalogued as Lbs fragm 82. It is a single vellum leaf from c. 1260, a part of the Saga of St. Olaf; the rest of the manuscript was lost to fire in 1728.

== Summary ==
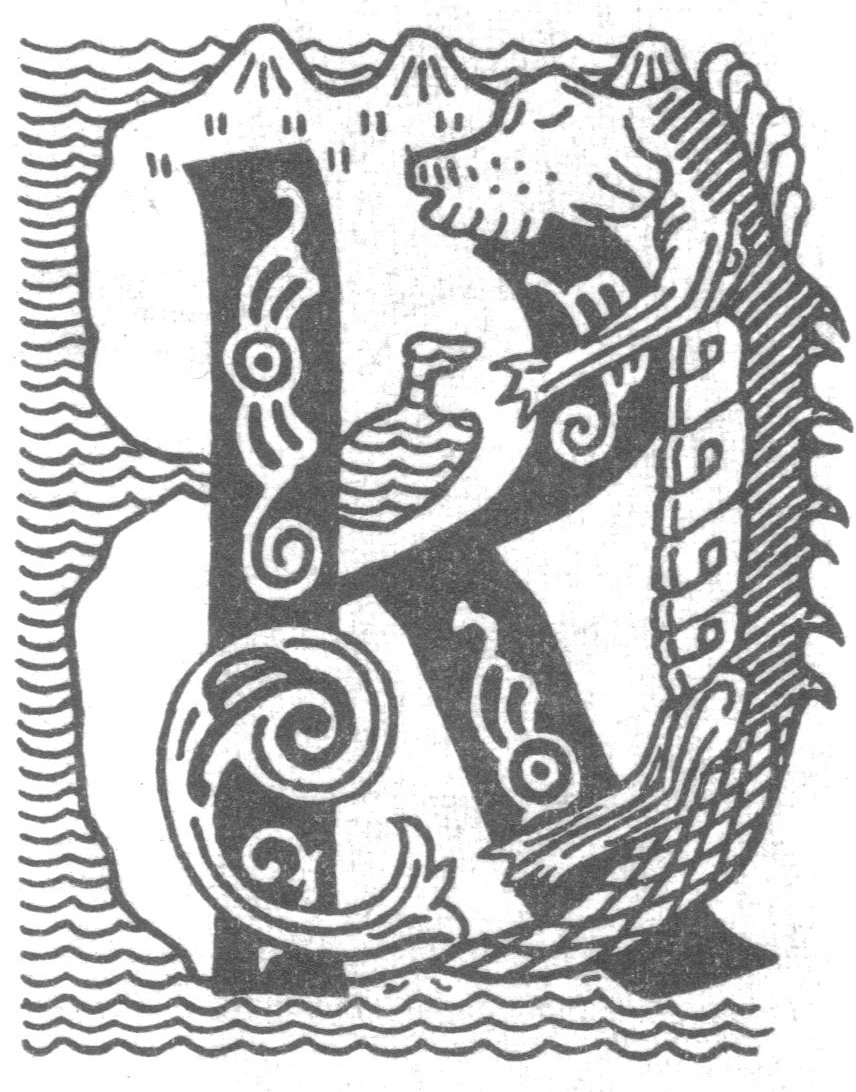
Gerhard Munthe, Kringla Heimsins, illustration for Ynglinga Saga

Heimskringla consists of several sagas, often thought of as falling into three groups, giving the overall work the character of a triptych. The saga narrates the contests of the kings, the establishment of the kingdom of Norway, Norse expeditions to various European countries, ranging as far afield as Palestine in the saga of Sigurd the Crusader, where the Norwegian fleet is attacked by Arab Muslim pirates, referred to as Vikings. The stories are told with energy, giving a picture of human life in all its dimensions. The saga is a prose epic, relevant to the history of not only Scandinavia but the regions included in the wider medieval Scandinavian diaspora. The first part of the Heimskringla is rooted in Norse mythology; as the collection proceeds, fable and fact intermingle, but the accounts become increasingly historically reliable.

The first saga tells of the mythological prehistory of the Swedish and Norwegian royal dynasty, the Ynglings, tracing their lineage to Freyr (Yngve) of the Vanaland people, who arrived in Scandinavia with Odin from the legendary Asgard. The subsequent sagas are (with few exceptions) devoted to individual rulers, starting with Halfdan the Black.

A version of Óláfs saga helga, about the saint Olaf II of Norway, is the main and central part of the collection: Olaf's 15-year-long reign takes up about one third of the entire work.

Thereafter, the saga of Harald Hardrada narrates Harald's expedition to the East, his brilliant exploits in Constantinople, Syria, and Sicily, his skaldic accomplishments, and his battles in England against Harold Godwinson, the son of Godwin, Earl of Wessex, where he fell at the Battle of Stamford Bridge in 1066, only a few days before Harold fell at the Battle of Hastings. After presenting a series of other kings, the saga ends with Magnus V of Norway.

=== Contents ===
Heimskringla contains the following sagas (see also List of Norwegian monarchs):

1. Ynglinga saga
2. Saga of Halfdanr svarti ("the Black")
3. Saga of Haraldr hárfagi ("Finehair") (died c. 931)
4. Saga of Hákon góði ("the Good") (died 961)
5. Saga of King Haraldr gráfeldr ("Greycloak") (died 969)
6. Saga of King Óláfr Tryggvason (died 1000)
7. Saga of King Óláfr Haraldsson (died 1030), excerpt from conversion of Dale-Gudbrand
8. Saga of Magnús góði ("the Good") (died 1047)
9. Saga of Haraldr harðráði ("Hardruler") (died 1066)
10. Saga of Óláfr Haraldsson kyrri ("the Gentle") (died 1093)
11. Saga of Magnús berfœttr ("Barefoot") (died 1103)
12. Saga of Sigurðr Jórsalafari ("Jerusalem-traveller") (died 1130) and his brothers Eystein (c. 1088 – 1123) and Olav (1099–1115))
13. Saga of Magnús blindi ("the Blind") (dethroned 1135) and of Haraldr Gilli (died 1136)
14. Saga of Sigurðr (died 1155), Eysteinn (died 1157) and Ingi (died 1161), the sons of Haraldr
15. Saga of Hákon herðibreiðs ("the Broadshouldered") (died 1162)
16. Saga of Magnús Erlingsson (died 1184)

== Sources ==
Heimskringla explicitly mentions a few prose sources, now mostly lost in then-contemporary forms: Hryggjarstykki ('spine pieces') by Eiríkr Oddsson (covering events 1130–61), Skjǫldunga saga, an unidentified saga about Knútr inn gamli, and a text called Jarlasǫgurnar ('sagas of the jarls', which seems to correspond to the saga now known as Orkneyinga saga).

The author may have had access to a wide range of the early Scandinavian historical texts known today as the 'synoptic histories', but made most use of:

- Ágrip af Nóregs konunga sǫgum (copying its account of Harald Fairhair's wife Snæfríðr almost unchanged).
- Morkinskinna (the main source for the years 1030–1177, which he copied almost verbatim except for removing many of the anecdotal þættir).
- Possibly Fagrskinna, itself based on Morkinskinna, but the much shorter.
- His own Separate saga of St Óláfr, which he incorporated bodily into Heimskringla. This text was apparently based primarily on a saga of Olaf from about 1220 by Styrmir Kárason, now mostly lost.
- Oddr Snorrason's Life of Óláfr Tryggvason, and possibly a Latin life of the same figure by Gunnlaugr Leifsson.

The author also made extensive use of skaldic verse which he believed to have been composed at the time of the events portrayed and transmitted orally from that time onwards, and clearly made use of other oral accounts, though it is uncertain to what extent.

== Historical reliability ==
Up until the mid-19th century, historians put great trust in the factual truth of Snorri's narrative, as well as other old Norse sagas. In the early 20th century, this trust was largely abandoned with the advent of saga criticism, pioneered by the Swedish historians Lauritz and Curt Weibull. These historians pointed out that Snorri's work had been written several centuries after most of the events it describes. In Norway, the historian Edvard Bull famously proclaimed that "we have to give up all illusions that Snorri's mighty epic bears any deeper resemblance to what actually happened" in the time it describes. A school of historians has come to believe that the motives Snorri and the other saga writers give to their characters owe more to conditions in the 13th century than in earlier times.

Heimskringla has, however, continued to be used as a historical source, though with more caution. It is not common to believe in the detailed accuracy of the historical narrative and historians tend to see little to no historical truth behind the first few sagas, however, they are still seen by many as a valuable source of knowledge about the society and politics of medieval Norway. The factual content of the work tends to be deemed more credible where it discusses more recent times, as the distance in time between the events described and the composition of the saga was shorter, allowing traditions to be retained in a largely accurate form, and because in the twelfth century the first contemporary written sources begin to emerge in Norway.

== Influence ==
Whereas prior to Heimskringla there seems to have been a diversity of efforts to write histories of kings, Heimskringla seems thereafter to have been the basis for Icelandic writing about Scandinavian kings, and was expanded by scribes rather than entirely revised. Flateyjarbók, from the end of the fourteenth century, is the most extreme example of expansion, interweaving Heimskringla text with many þættir and other whole sagas, prominently Orkneyinga saga, Færeyinga saga, and Fóstbrœðra saga.

The text is also referenced in Journey to the Center of the Earth by Jules Verne; the work is the one Professor Liedenbrock finds Arne Saknussem's note in.

== Editions and translations ==
=== History of translations ===
By the mid-16th century, the Old Norse language was unintelligible to Norwegian, Swedish or Danish readers. At that time several translations of extracts were made in Norway into the Danish language, which was the literary language of Norway at the time. The first complete translation was made around 1600 by Peder Claussøn Friis, and printed in 1633. This was based on a manuscript known as Jofraskinna.

Subsequently, the Stockholm manuscript was translated into Swedish and Latin by Johan Peringskiöld (by order of Charles XI) and published in 1697 at Stockholm under the title Heimskringla, which is the first known use of the name. This edition also included the first printing of the text in Old Norse. A new Danish translation with the text in Old Norse and a Latin translation came out in 1777–83 (by order of Frederick VI as crown prince). An English translation by Samuel Laing was finally published in 1844, with a second edition in 1889. Starting in the 1960s English-language revisions of Laing appeared, as well as fresh English translations.

In the 19th century, as Norway was achieving independence after centuries of union with Denmark and Sweden, the stories of the independent Norwegian medieval kingdom won great popularity in Norway. Heimskringla, although written by an Icelander, became an important national symbol for Norway during the period of romantic nationalism. In 1900, the Norwegian parliament, the Storting, subsidized the publication of new translations of Heimskringla into both Norwegian written forms, landsmål and riksmål, "in order that the work may achieve wide distribution at a low price".

=== Editions ===
- Snorra Sturlusonar (1869–1872). Linder, N.; Haggson, H. A. (eds.). Heimskringla eða Sögur Noregs konunga. Uppsala: W. Schultz. Google Books vols 1–2, Google Books vol. 3
- Snorri Sturluson (1941–1951). Aðalbjarnarson, Bjarni (ed.). Heimskringla. Reykjavík: Hið íslenzka fornritafélag.

=== Translations ===
The most recent (2011-2015) English translation of Heimskringla is by Alison Finlay and Anthony Faulkes and is available open-access from the Viking Society for Northern Research.

- Snorri Sturluson (1844). The Heimskringla: or, Chronicle of the Kings of Norway. Translated by Laing, Samuel. London: Longman, Brown, Green, and Longmans. HTML (repr. Everyman's Library, 717, 722, 847).
- Snorri Sturluson (1891–1905). The Saga Library: Done into English out of the Icelandic. Vol. 3–6. Translated by Morris, William; Magnússon, Eiríkr. London: Quaritch.
- Snorri Sturluson (1964). Heimskringla: History of the Kings of Norway. Translated by Hollander, Lee M. Austin: University of Texas Press.
- Snorri Sturluson (2000). Histoire des rois de Norvège, première partie: des origines mythiques de la dynastie à la bataille de Svold. Translated by Dillmann, François-Xavier. Paris: Gallimard.
- Snorri Sturluson (2011–2016). Heimskringla. Translated by Finlay, Alison; Faulkes, Anthony. London: Viking Society for Northern Research. vol 1 (1st edn); vol 1 (2nd edn); vol 2; vol. 3.
