= Hopen =

Hopen or Höpen may refer to:

- Hopen (Svalbard), an island in Svalbard, Norway
- Hopen, Møre og Romsdal, a village in Smøla Municipality in Møre og Romsdal county, Norway
- Hopen, Nordland, a village in Vågan Municipality in Nordland county, Norway
- Hopen Church, a church in Smøla Municipality in Møre og Romsdal county, Norway
- Hopen Radio, a radio station in Svalbard, Norway
- Höpen Airfield, near Schneverdingen, Germany

== Persons with the surname Hopen ==
- Ørjan Hopen, Norwegian footballer
