= Guttorm Pedersen =

Norwegian sculptor (1903–1970)

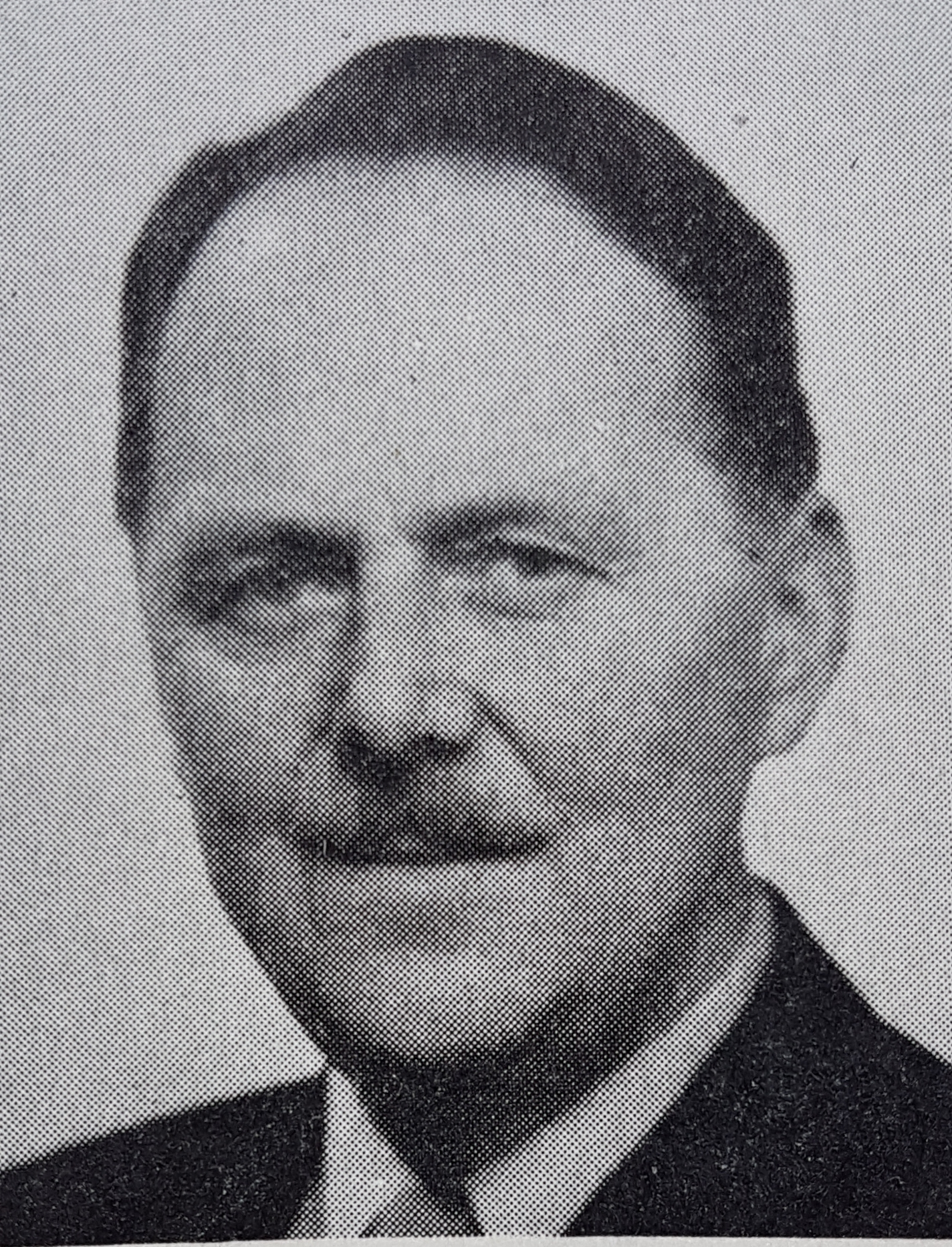
Guttorm Pedersen

Guttorm Andreas Pedersen (9 October 1903 – 10 April 1970) was a Norwegian sculptor.

He was born in Tromsø. Attending drawing and modeling schools in Trondheim, he studied for six months at the National Academy of Craft and Art Industry and then studied under Wilhelm Rasmussen at the National Academy of Fine Arts from 1924 to 1926. He took part in the Autumn Exhibition in 1925, 1927, 1928, 1930, 1932, 1933, 1934, 1935 and 1940. He also took part in the 1937 Paris World Fair and a retrospective National Gallery exhibition in 1940.

During the German occupation of Norway from April 1940 to May 1945, Pedersen became designated as an artist for the Quisling regime. He took part in the exhibition Hirdkunst at the National Gallery in 1942 and Norge på havet in Oslo Håndverks- og Industriforening (Håndverkeren) in 1944. In the same year, the Norwegian Shipowners' Association purchased Pedersen's memorial over "fallen sailors", which is believed to have been destroyed after the war. In May 1945, days before the war ended, it was announced that Pedersen made a Waffen-SS statue for a "front fighter" exhibition at Oslo Håndverks- og Industriforening. A commission of a statue for a square in Frogner, made by the Quisling-forged Oslo city council, was also cancelled after the war.

In 1948 he was rehabilitated to the extent that he was invited to an exhibition, the Third Art Exhibition of Northern Norway. He returned to the Art Exhibition of Northern Norway in 1949 and 1953 as well as the Autumn Exhibition of 1954 and 1955. He died in April 1970 in Romania.
