= Hopen, Møre og Romsdal =

Village in Smøla Municipality, Norway

Hopen
- Village
- Interactive map of Hopen
- Location within Møre og Romsdal Location within Norway
- Coordinates: 63.4654°N 08.0144°E
- Country: Norway
- Region: Western Norway
- County: Møre og Romsdal
- District: Nordmøre
- Municipality: Smøla Municipality
- Elevation: 9 m (30 ft)

Population (2015)
  - Total: 930
- Time zone: UTC+01:00 (CET)
  - Summer (DST): UTC+02:00 (CEST)
- Post Code: 6570 Smøla

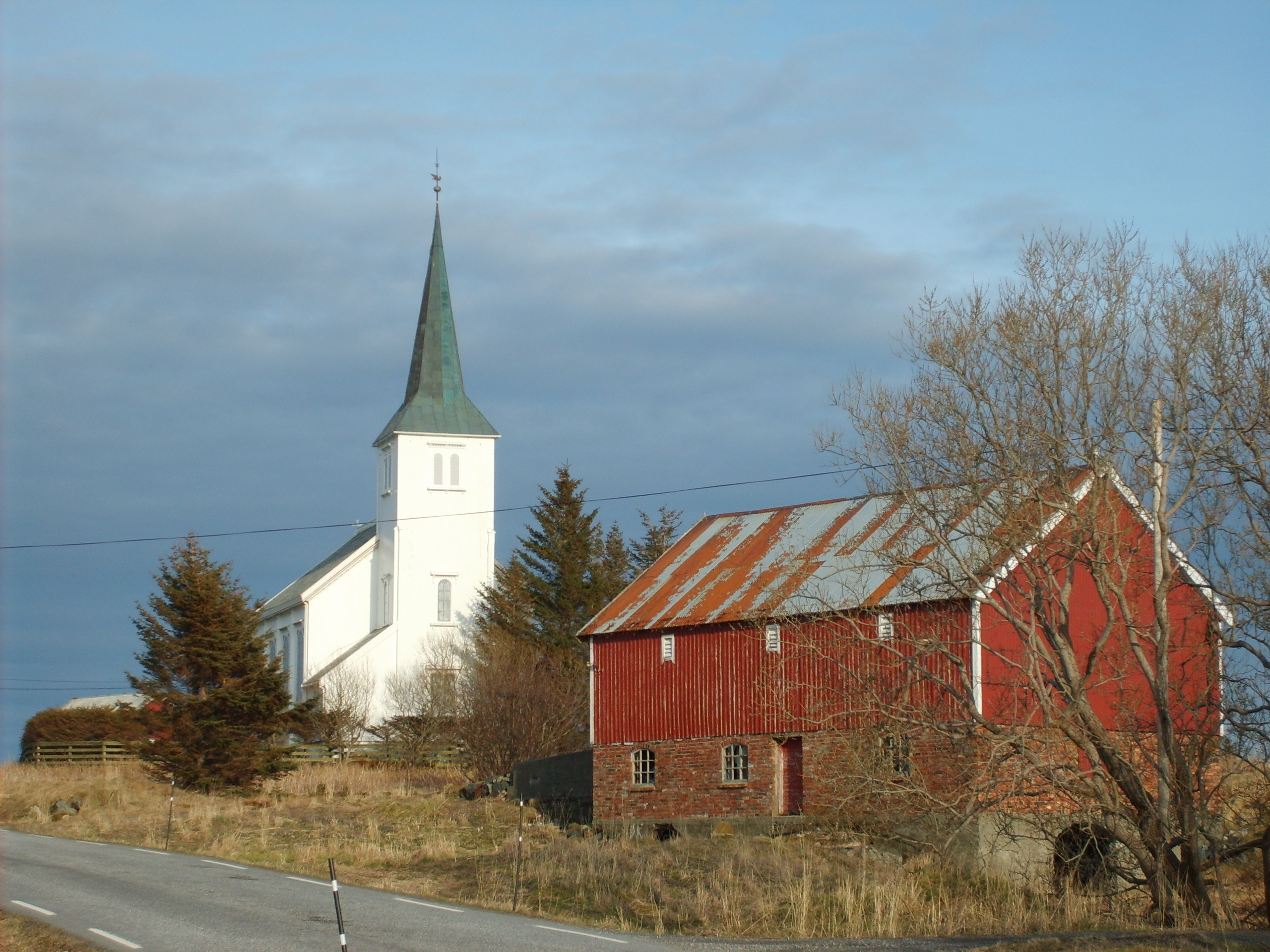

Hopen is the administrative center of Smøla Municipality in Møre og Romsdal county, Norway. The village lies east of the villages of Dyrnes and Råket on the northern coast of the island of Smøla. The main road through Hopen is Norwegian County Road 669 which also heads north connecting many small islands and ending at the island village of Veiholmen. In 2015, there were 930 residents of Hopen.

Hopen Church is located in the village.

== History ==
From 1915 until 1960, the village was the administrative centre of the old Hopen Municipality.

=== Name ===
The name of the village is Hopen (Old Norse: hópr) since the first Hopen Church was located in the village. The name comes from the word hópr which means "bay".
