= Hopen Church =

Church in Møre og Romsdal, Norway

- Hopen kirke
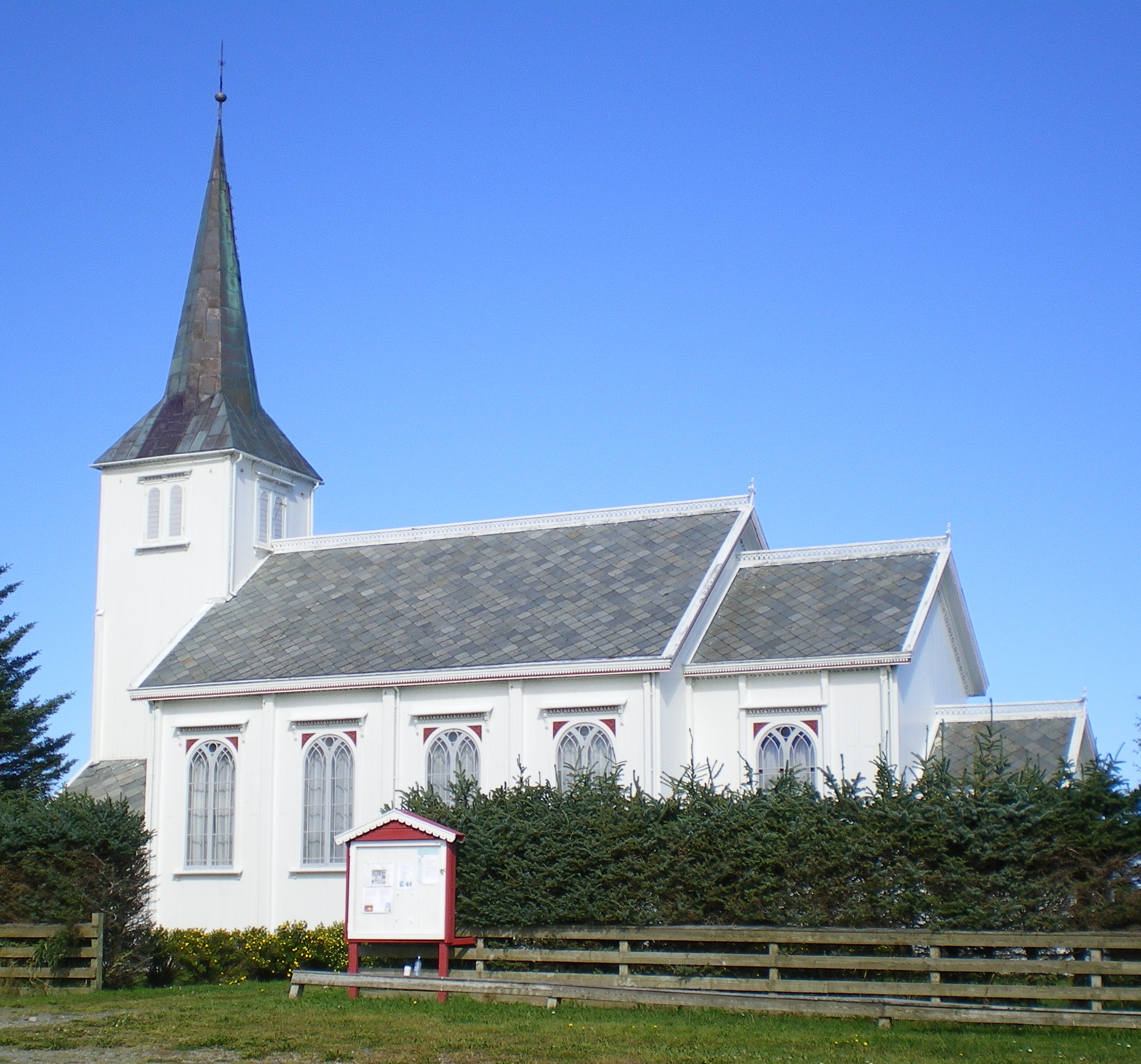
- View of the church
- Hopen Church
- 63.4659351007°N 8.01337435841°E
- Location: Smøla Municipality, Møre og Romsdal
- Country: Norway
- Denomination: Church of Norway
- Churchmanship: Evangelical Lutheran

History
- Status: Parish church
- Founded: 14th century
- Consecrated: 20 July 1892

Architecture
- Functional status: Active
- Architect: Adolf Schirmer
- Architectural type: Long church
- Completed: 1892 (134 years ago)

Specifications
- Capacity: 260
- Materials: Wood

Administration
- Diocese: Møre bispedømme
- Deanery: Ytre Nordmøre prosti
- Parish: Hopen
- Norwegian Cultural Heritage Site
- Type: Church
- Status: Not protected
- ID: 84626

Hopen Church (Norwegian: Hopen kirke) is a parish church of the Church of Norway in Smøla Municipality in Møre og Romsdal county, Norway. It is located in the village of Hopen, along the northern coast of the island of Smøla. It is the church for the Hopen parish which is part of the Ytre Nordmøre prosti (deanery) in the Diocese of Møre. The white, wooden church was built in a long church style in 1892 by the architect Adolf Schirmer. The church seats about 260 people.

== History ==
The earliest existing historical records of the church date to the year 1589, but the church was not new that year. The first church in Hopen was established during the Middle Ages at Veiholmen on a small island about 6 kilometres (3.7 mi) northwest of the present church site. The church was a stave church with no tower or spire. It was likely built during the 14th century. The rocky island was not a good site for a cemetery alongside the church, so residents had to travel to Brattvær Church for funerals and burials. By the 1720s, the church was in poor condition and it was decided to find a new church site and to build a new church there. It was decided to build the church on the north side of the main island of Smøla in the village of Hopen. The new church was completed in 1749. The old church was closed and it wasn't until 1760 that the old church was torn down. Most of the interior furniture from the old church was transferred to the new church in Hopen.

The new church in Hopen was a timber-framed, octagonal church with a sacristy on the east end. It was consecrated on 5 August 1749 and it was formally named Hopen Church, but it was quite often called Smøla Church since it was the first church on that larger island (there were several other church on smaller surrounding islands). The new church included a graveyard surrounding the building. The tower and spire on the roof was struck by lightning and damaged on Christmas Day 1842. It was repaired soon afterwards. In 1884, the cemetery surrounding the church was closed because the soil was thin and wet and difficult to bury people. Burial sites were used at Ytre Roksvåg and on Veiholmen after the cemetery was closed. By the mid-1880s, the church had fallen into disrepair so thoroughly that it could not be saved. In 1890, permission was granted to demolish the church and build a new one on the same site. The last service was held on 8 February 1891.

The new church was completed in 1892 and consecrated on 20 July 1892. It was designed by Adolf Schirmer and built by builder Christian Hovde (who had also recently built the nearby Brattvær Church). The new church was a wooden long church with a tower on the west end and a choir and sacristy on the east end. In 1966, a new baptismal sacristy and bathroom were built on both sides of the tower.

== Media gallery ==
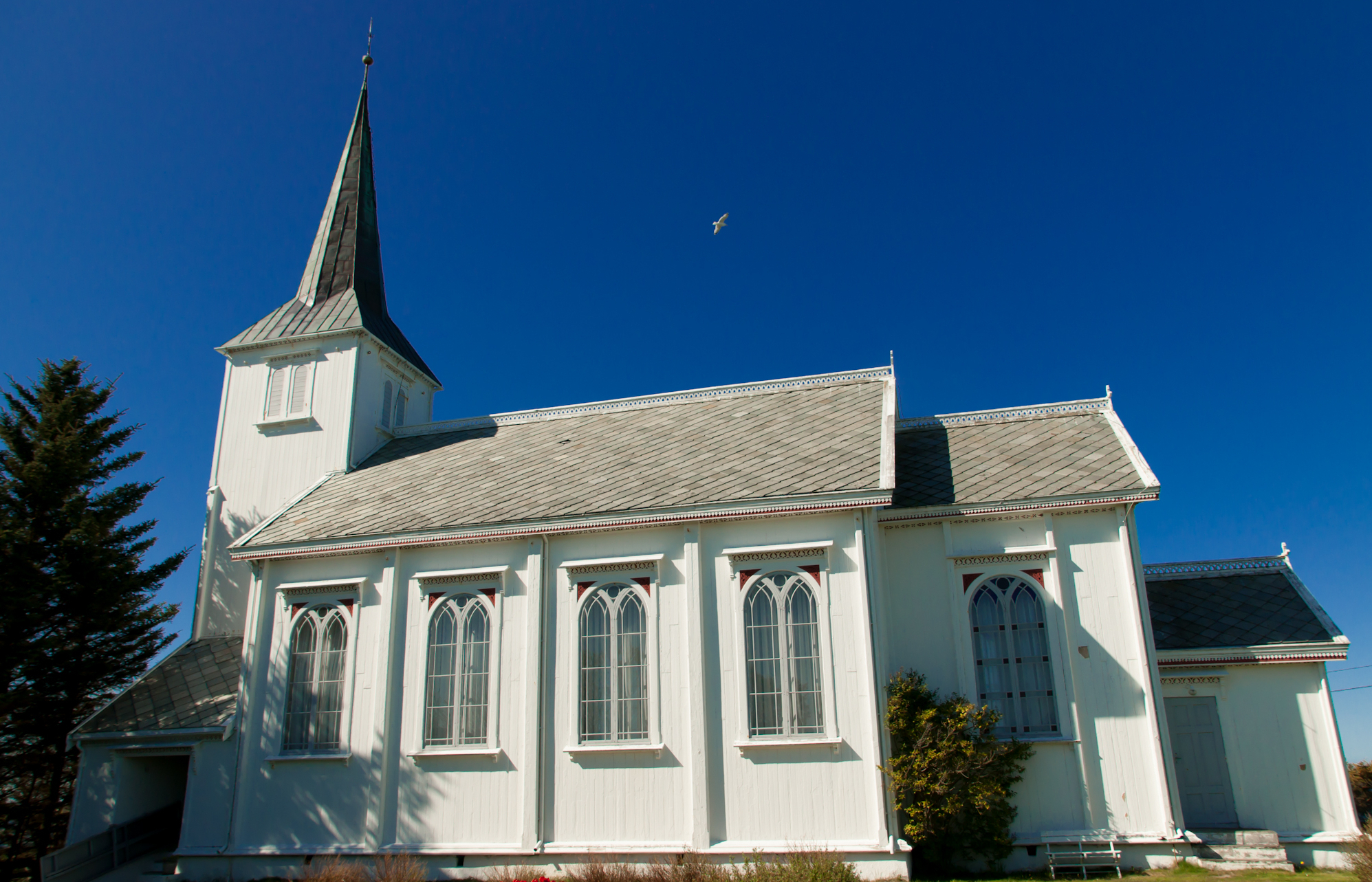

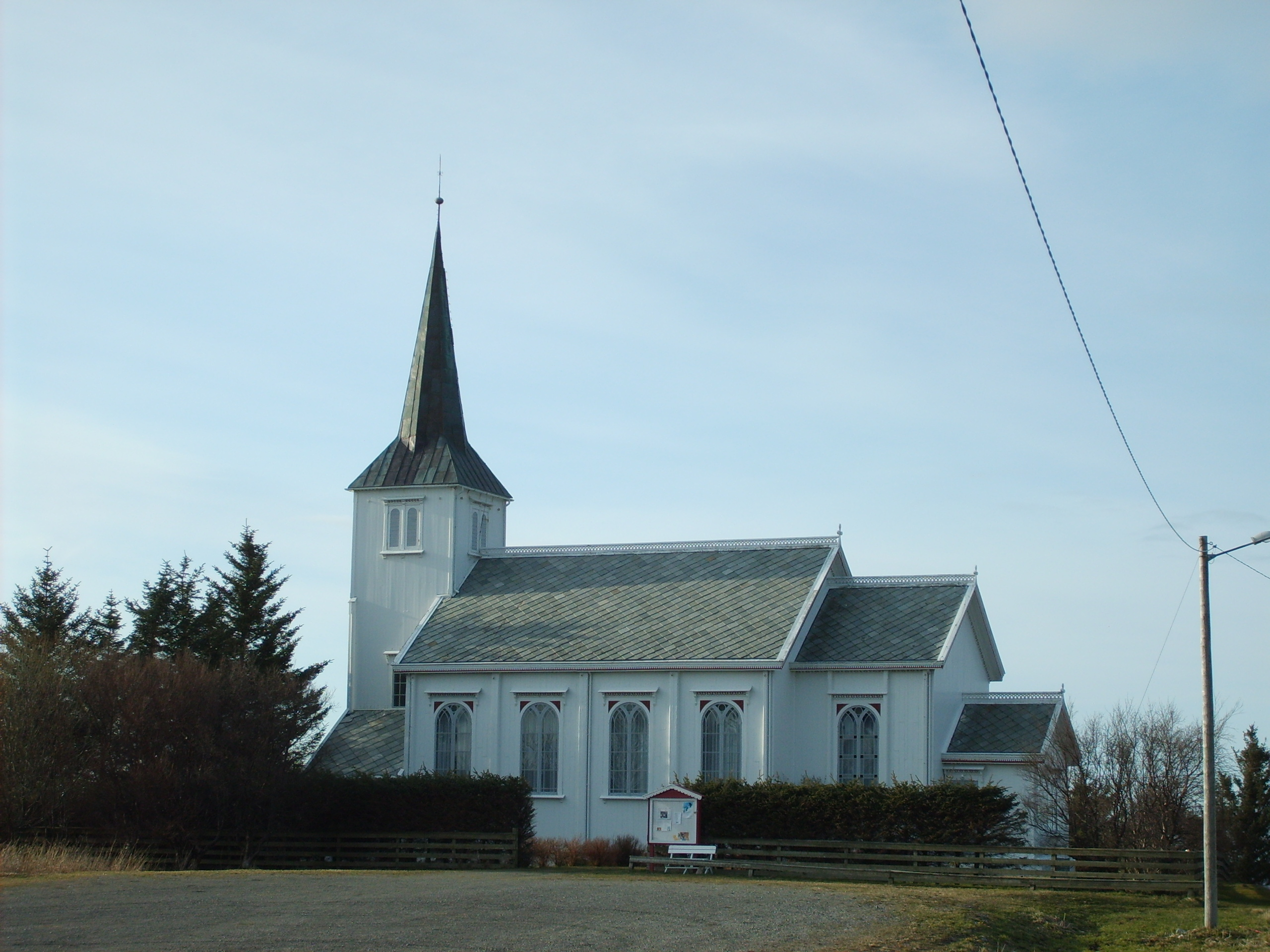

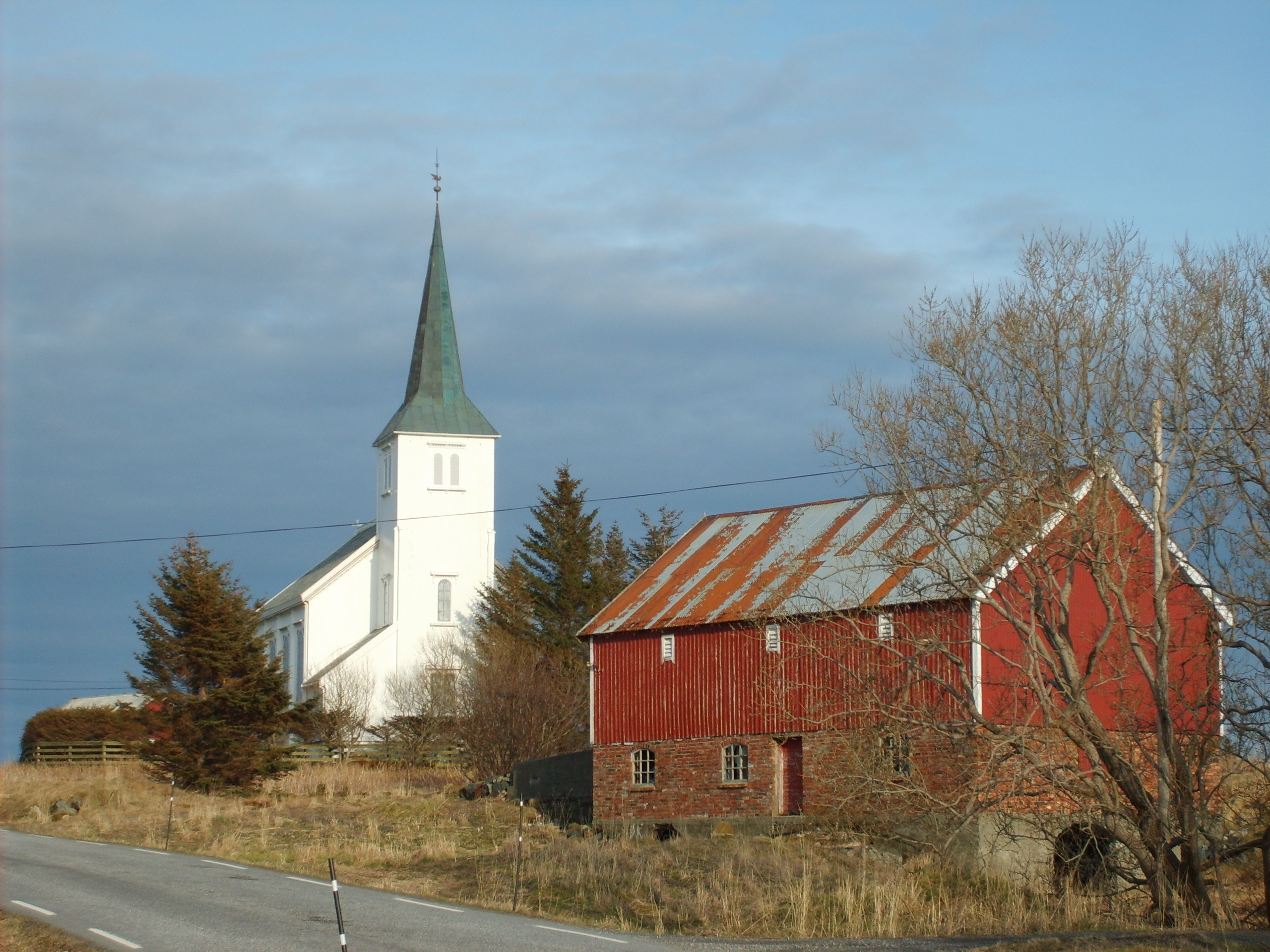

== See also ==
- List of churches in Møre
