= Brattværet =

Island group in Møre og Romsdal, Norway

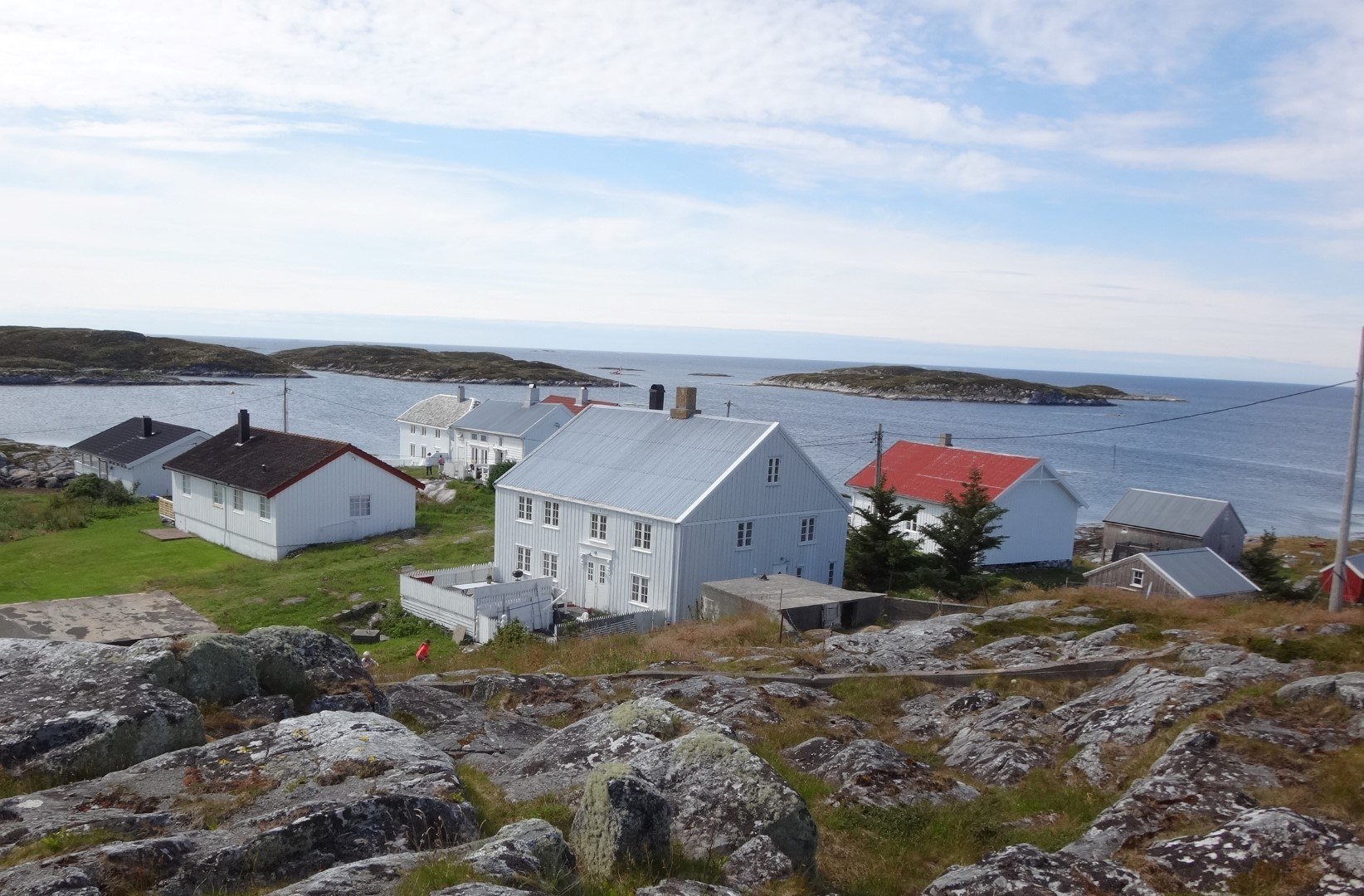
- View of the main island
- Interactive map of Brattværet

Geography
- Location: Møre og Romsdal, Norway
- Coordinates: 63.45259°N 7.81313°E

Administration
- Norway
- County: Møre og Romsdal
- Municipality: Smøla Municipality

Brattværet is an archipelago in Smøla Municipality in Møre og Romsdal county, Norway. The islands lies about 3.5 kilometres (2.2 mi) to the northwest of the main island of Smøla, off the coast of Nordmøre. The main island of Brattvær was once one of the largest fishing villages in Nordmøre, and at its peak there were just under 300 people living on the small island. Now there are no more permanent residents left on Brattværet, but the archipelago is used for holiday cottages almost all year round.

Brattværet previously had its own shop, fish reception, flour factory, cod liver oil distillery, school, chapel and sawmill. Of these, only the flour factory, school, chapel and shop remain, and only the chapel is in operation. The flour factory and shop are privately owned and are mostly used as warehouses and the like, while the school has been converted into a cabin.

== History ==
Historically, the Brattvær Church was located on the island, serving the people who lived in the fishing village. The church was originally built as a stave church. It existed from the 1400s until it blew down in a storm in the early 1700s. In 1709, a chapel was built to replace the old church. In 1885, the new Brattvær Church was moved onto the island of Smøla.

A new Brattvær Chapel was built on the island in 1895 and is dedicated as a church, and baptisms, weddings and funerals have often been held there. Once every summer, Smøla Parish Council arranges a church service in the prayer house. From 1915-1960, it was part of the old Brattvær Municipality.

The school at Brattværet was closed in 1959, when Bakkamyra Primary School at Råket the main island of Smøla was opened. In the 1950s and 1960s, people started to move away from the island, mainly moving to Råket and Kristiansund. Some took their houses with them, others sold them, while some just left them. By 1970, almost everyone had moved away from the island, except for a few people.

In 1978, there was a major fire on the island. A fire started in the owner's house, which caused six neighboring houses to catch fire. Five of the houses burned down completely, while one was extinguished. The owner's house on Brattværet was at one time the largest timber building in Nordmøre, but after the fire, a slightly smaller house was erected.

The last permanent resident to move from Brattværet lived there almost until the 1990s. From 2009-2013, a man named Leif Birger Hagen decided to move back to his childhood home on the island. He lived there until 2013, when he moved back to Råket. Since then, the island has had no permanent residents, but it does have visitors who stay in the remaining houses for holidays.

== Media gallery ==
Historical photos of Brattværet

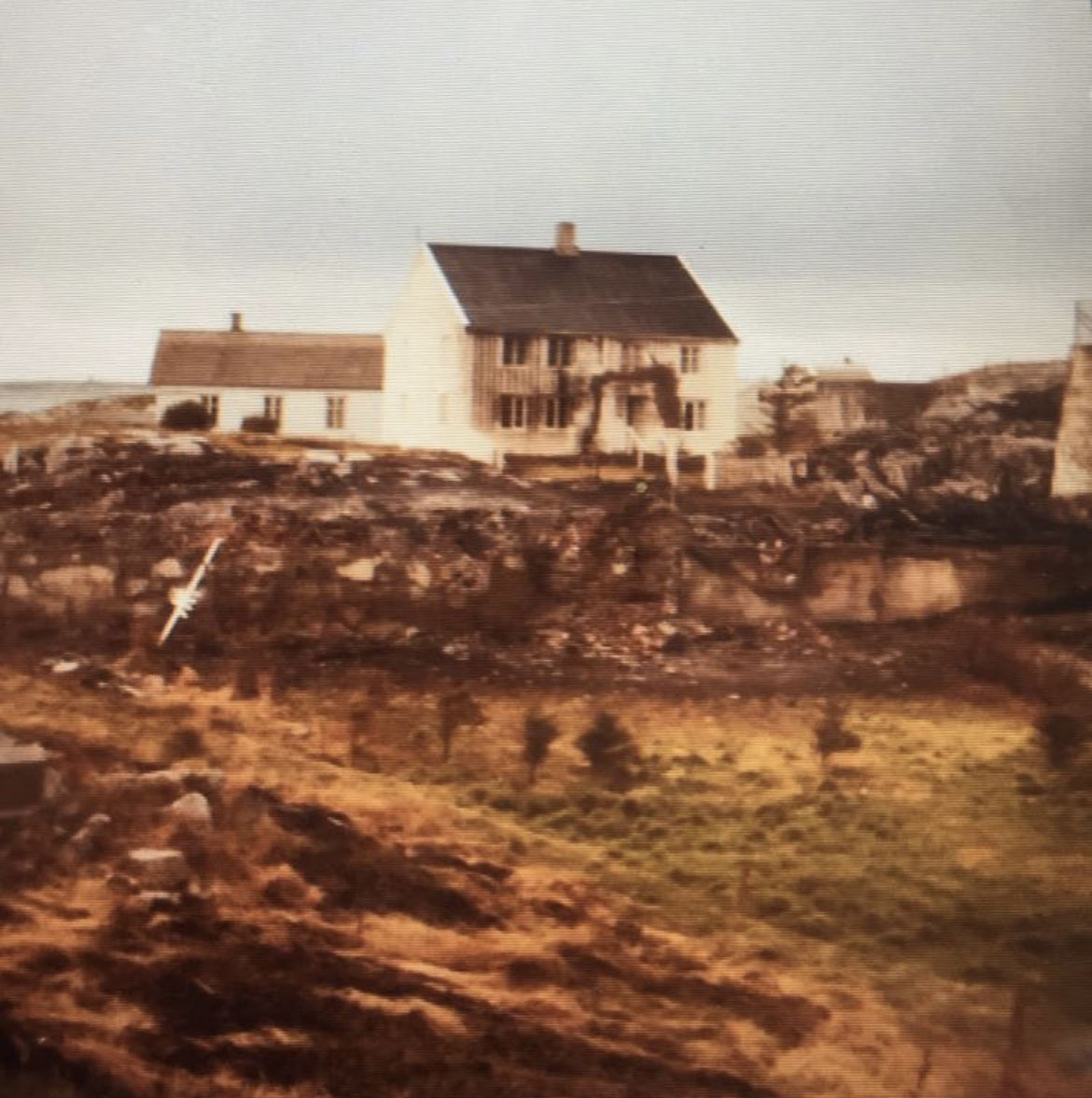

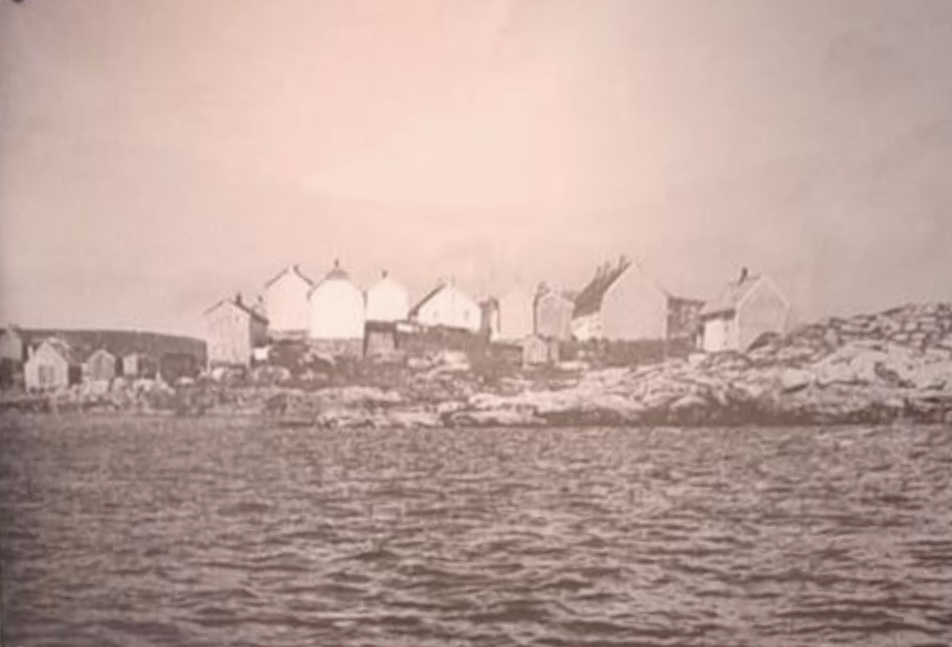

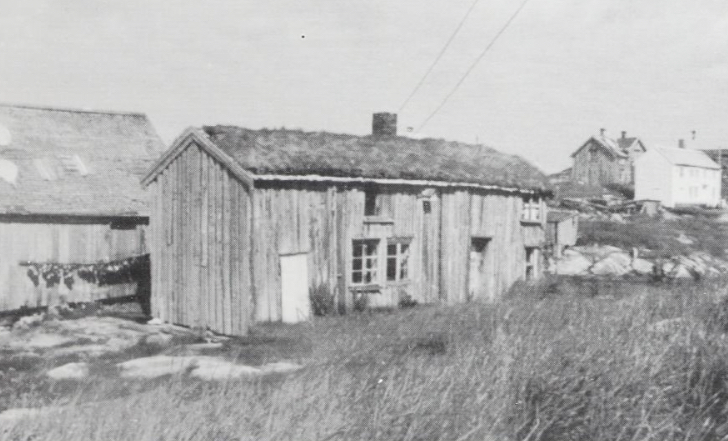

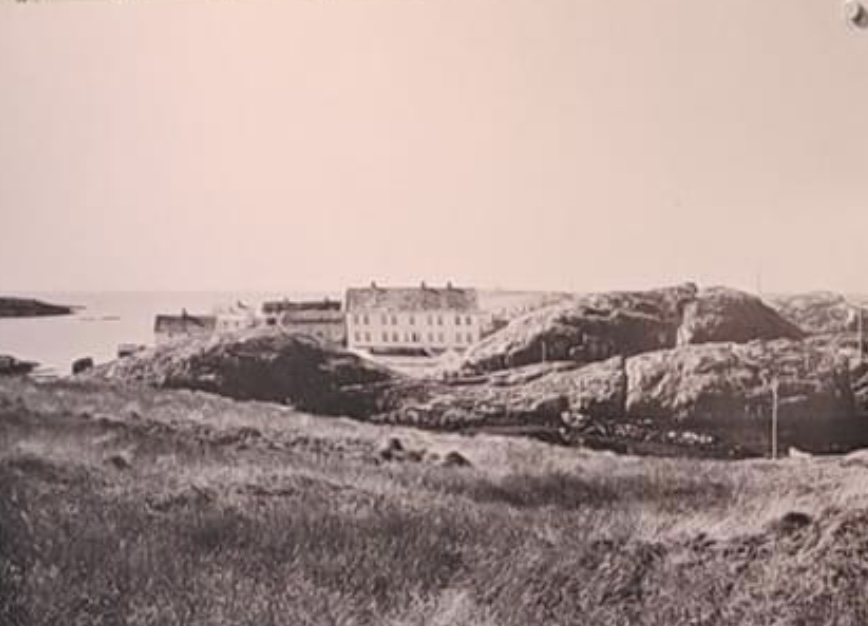

== See also ==
- List of islands of Norway
