= Stiklestad Church =

Church in Trøndelag, Norway

- Stiklestad kirke
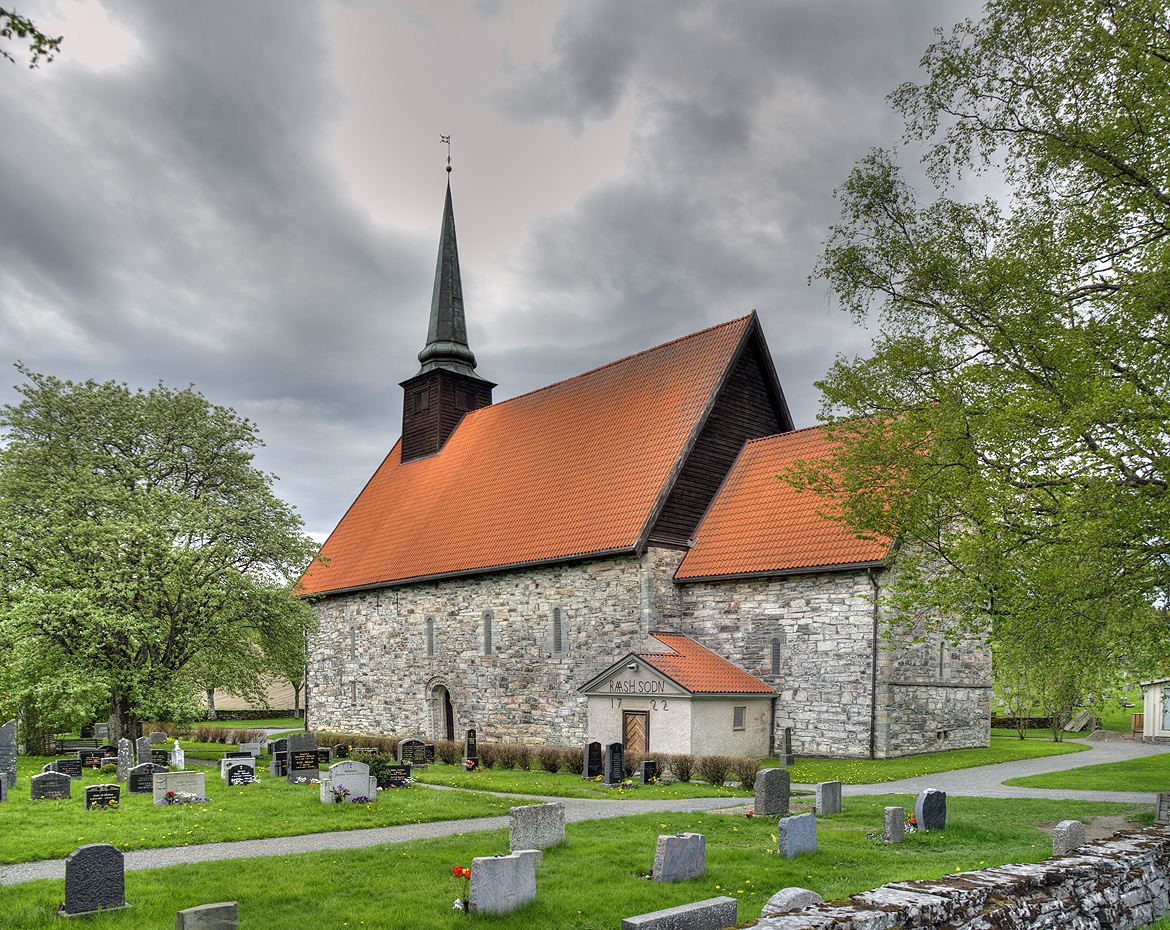
- View of the church
- Stiklestad Church
- 63.796919726°N 11.560127735°E
- Location: Verdal Municipality, Trøndelag
- Country: Norway
- Denomination: Church of Norway
- Previous denomination: Catholic Church
- Churchmanship: Evangelical Lutheran

History
- Status: Parish church
- Founded: c. 1180
- Consecrated: c. 1180

Architecture
- Functional status: Active
- Architect: Archbishop Øystein Erlendsson
- Architectural type: Long church
- Style: Romanesque
- Completed: c. 1180 (846 years ago)

Specifications
- Capacity: 520
- Materials: Stone

Administration
- Diocese: Nidaros bispedømme
- Deanery: Stiklestad prosti
- Parish: Stiklestad
- Norwegian Cultural Heritage Site
- Type: Church
- Status: Automatically protected
- ID: 85569

Stiklestad Church (Norwegian: Stiklestad kirke) is a parish church of the Church of Norway in Verdal Municipality in Trøndelag county, Norway. It is located in the village of Stiklestad. It is one of the churches for the Stiklestad parish which is part of the Stiklestad prosti (deanery) in the Diocese of Nidaros. The gray, Romanesque church was built of stone in a long church design during the 12th century. The church seats about 520 people.

== History ==
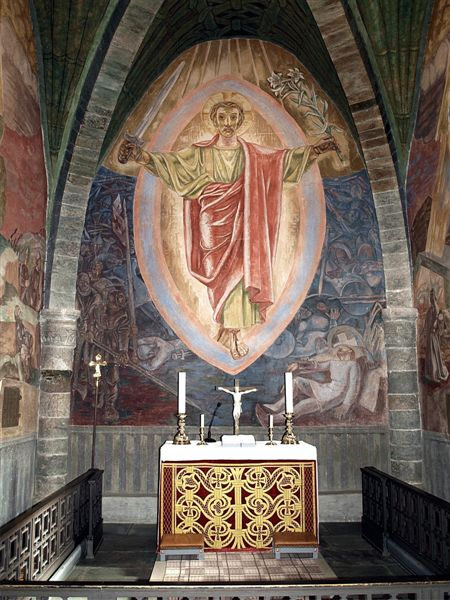
Stiklestad Church altar

Construction started with the building of the chancel in the years 1150-1180 under direction of Archbishop Øystein Erlendsson. The nave of the church was not completed until closer to the year 1200. The church was built at the site of the Battle of Stiklestad. During the battle, St. Olaf received three severe wounds: an axe to the knee, a spear into the stomach and the final mortal hit in the neck by another axe. He died on 29 July 1030 leaning against a large stone (Olavssteinen). The church building is assumed to have been erected on the exact spot where St. Olaf was killed during that battle and that stone is supposedly still inside the altar of the church.

During the 15th century, the nave was extended to the west by several meters using stone from a nearby church that had been torn down. During the 16th century, the land under the foundation had settled so much that the structure needed repairs, so two strong retaining walls were built along the west wall of the nave. The former baroque style altarpiece dates from 1655. It was carved by Johan Johansen and the altarpiece was originally painted by Johan Hanssønn.

In 1814, this church served as an election church (Norwegian: valgkirke). Together with more than 300 other parish churches across Norway, it was a polling station for elections to the 1814 Norwegian Constituent Assembly which wrote the Constitution of Norway. This was Norway's first national elections. Each church parish was a constituency that elected people called "electors" who later met together in each county to elect the representatives for the assembly that was to meet at Eidsvoll Manor later that year.

Stiklestad Church is the namesake of the Stiklestad United Lutheran Church in Minnesota, United States, established by Norwegian emigrants in 1897.

The church underwent a major restoration from 1928–1930 to coincide with the St. Olaf Jubilee (Olavsjubileet) that took place in 1930. Jakob Holmgren was one of the architects that led this restoration. During this renovation, the exterior plaster was removed to show the natural stone and the tower was rebuilt. Parts of the walls were rebuilt to compensate for settlement damage. Floors, benches, and the second floor seating gallery were renewed, frescoes on the walls were uncovered, and the choir's walls and vault were decorated with frescoes by Alf Rolfsen. No archaeological excavations were carried out during the restoration. It is therefore uncertain whether the church has had predecessors.

== Gallery ==
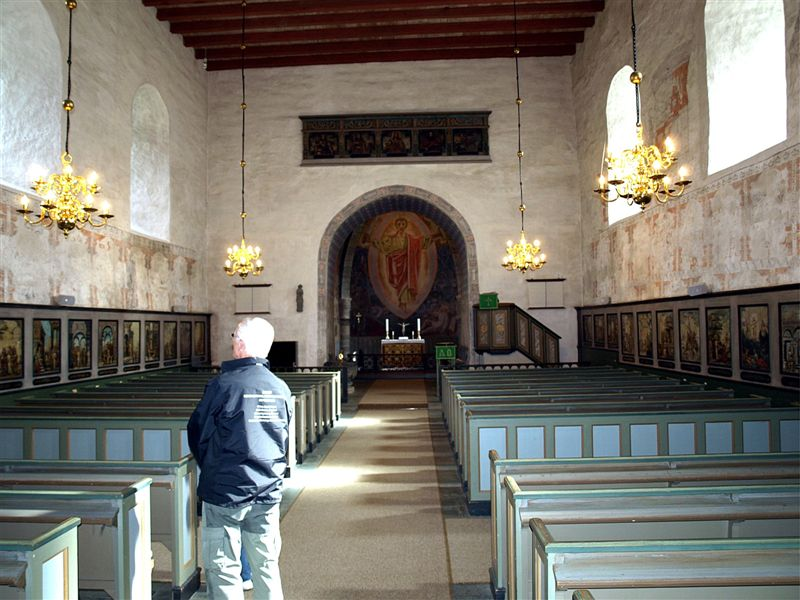
Front of the church (Chancel)

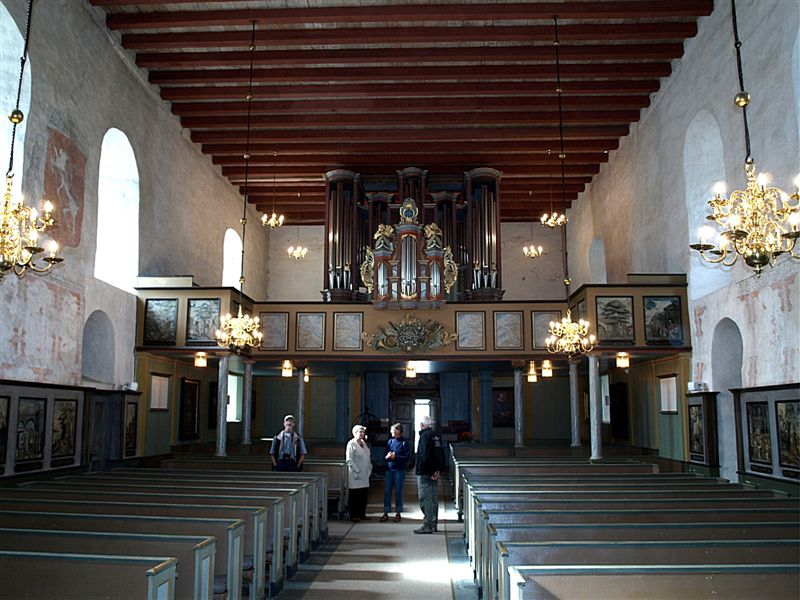
Back of the church (Nave)

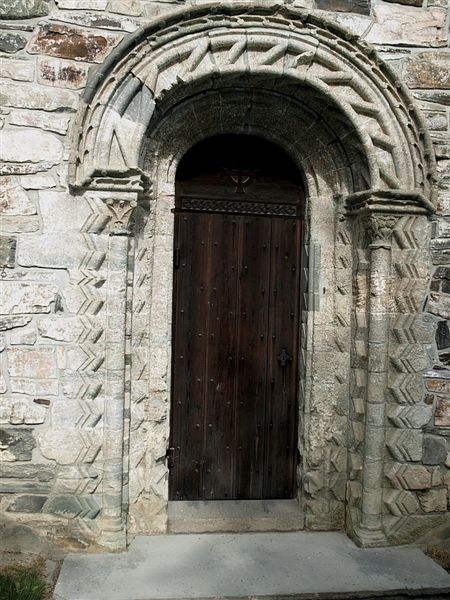
Side entrance

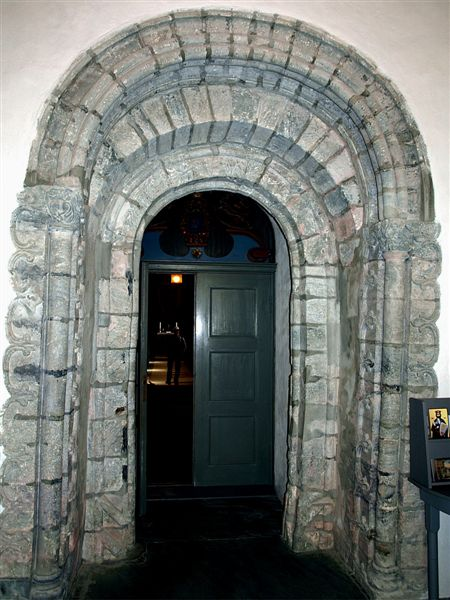
West entrance

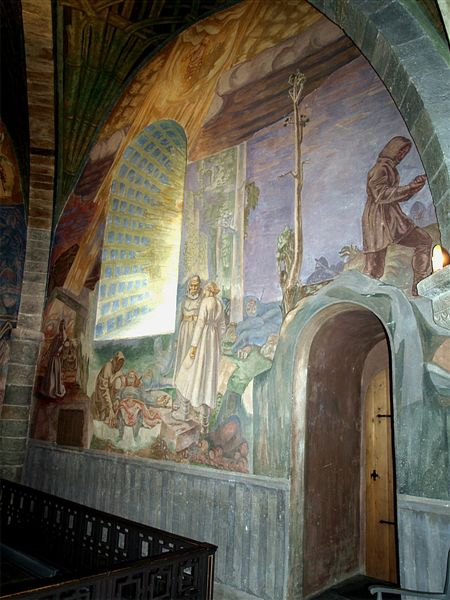
Wall mural
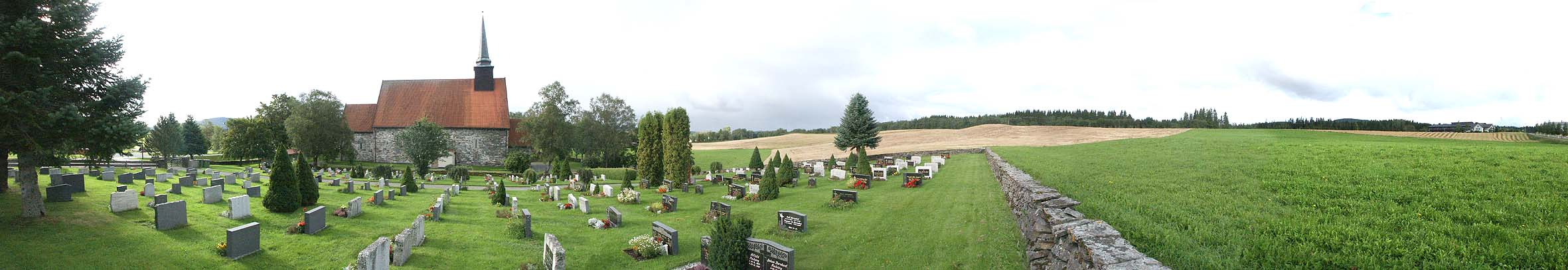
View of the area (scroll to the right for more of the picture)

== See also ==
- List of churches in Nidaros
