= Jakob Holmgren =

Norwegian architect

Jakob Parelius Holmgren
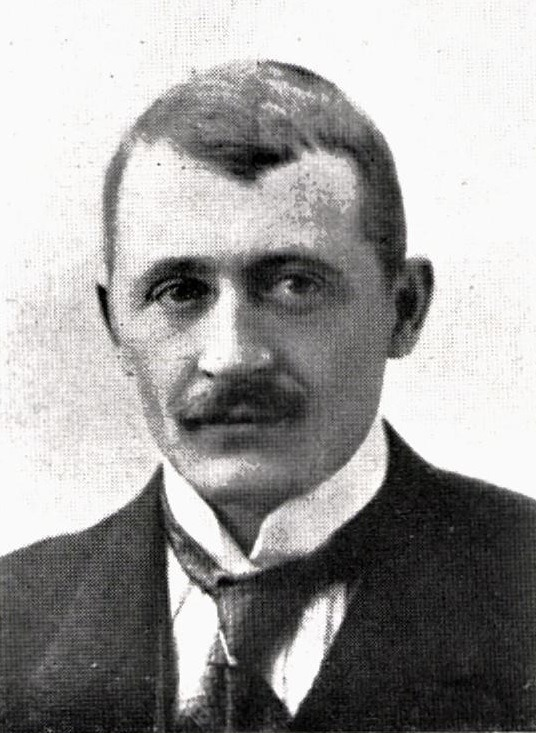
- Born: 17 January 1884; Alta, Norway
- Died: 3 January 1962 (aged 77); Trondheim, Norway
- Occupation: Architect
- Spouse: Agnes Gjestland
- Parent(s): Lorentz Jakob Parelius Holmgren and Marit Jakobsen

Jakob Parelius Holmgren (1884–1962) was a Norwegian architect and a professor of architecture at the Norwegian Institute of Technology from 1935 to 1955. He designed, among other things, the redevelopment of the interior of Trondhjems Sparebank from 1921 to 1924, which later won the Houen Foundation's prize in 1927.

Holmgren was educated at Norwegian Institute of Technology in 1903. He was hired soon after by Lars Solberg in Trondheim as an assistant architect. From 1904 to 1907, he worked on many buildings in Ålesund to help rebuild after the great city fire there. He started his own architecture practice in Trondheim starting in 1907. He designed a number of tenements in Trondheim that were built in the style of Neoclassical architecture. He designed the Brattvær Church on the island of Smøla and was part of the historic restoration of the Stiklestad Church from 1928 to 1930.
