= Dyrnes =

Village in Smøla Municipality, Norway

- Village
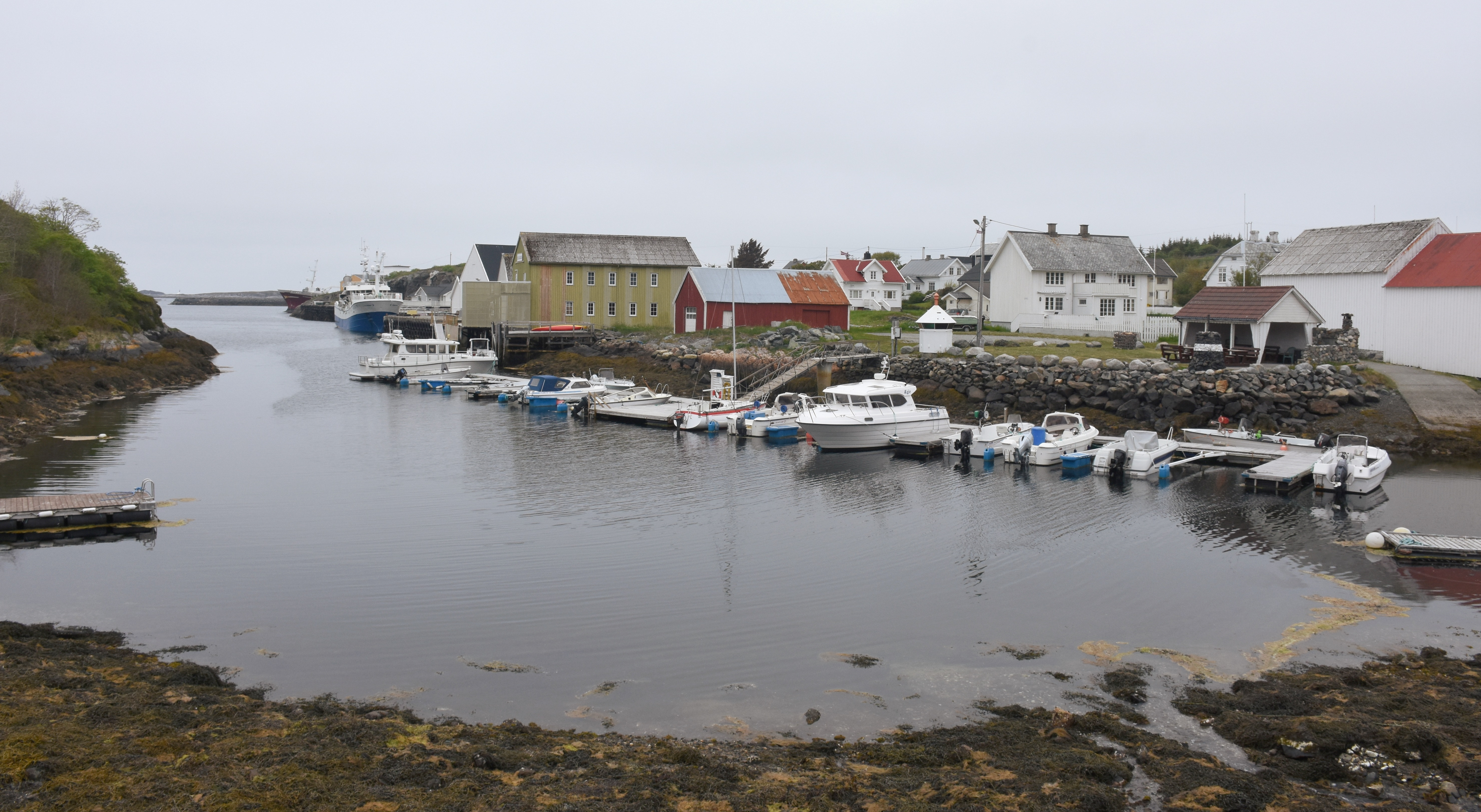
- Dyrnes, Smøla, Norway
- Interactive map of Dyrnes
- Location within Møre og Romsdal Location within Norway
- Coordinates: 63.4256°N 7.8534°E
- Country: Norway
- Region: Western Norway
- County: Møre og Romsdal
- District: Nordmøre
- Municipality: Smøla Municipality

Area
  - Total: 0.86 km^{2} (0.33 sq mi)
- Elevation: 5 m (16 ft)

Population (2003)
  - Total: 257
  - Density: 299/km^{2} (770/sq mi)
- Time zone: UTC+01:00 (CET)
  - Summer (DST): UTC+02:00 (CEST)
- Post Code: 6570 Smøla

Dyrnes is a village in Smøla Municipality in Møre og Romsdal county, Norway. It is located on the northwestern part of the island of Smøla, just east of the village of Råket, and southwest of the village of Veiholmen. The Smøla Wind Farm is located southeast of the village.

The villages of Råket and Dyrnes formerly constituted an urban area called Dyrnesvågen according to Statistics Norway. The 0.86-square-kilometre (210-acre) village area had a population (2003) of 257 and a population density of 299 inhabitants per square kilometre (770/sq mi). Since 2003, the population and area data for this village area has not been separately tracked by Statistics Norway.
