= Haugjegla Lighthouse =

Coastal lighthouse in Norway

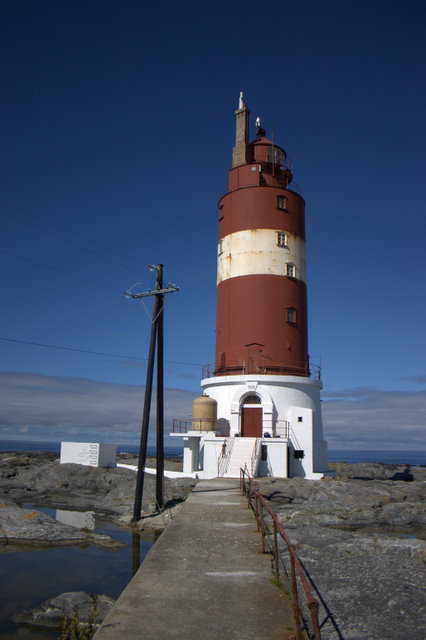
- Haugjegla Lighthouse
- Location: Møre og Romsdal; Norway
- Coordinates: 63°32′00″N 07°57′45″E

Tower
- Constructed: 1905 (first)
- Construction: cast iron tower
- Automated: 1988
- Height: 27.8 metres (91 ft)
- Shape: cylindrical tower with gallery and lantern
- Markings: White basement, red tower with white band, red lantern
- Operator: Hopen Aktivitetsgård
- Heritage: cultural heritage preservation in Norway
- Racon: B

Light
- First lit: 1922 (current)
- Focal height: 26.5 metres (87 ft)
- Intensity: 126,000 candela
- Range: 15.3 nmi (28.3 km; 17.6 mi)
- Characteristic: Oc(2) WRG 8s.

Haugjegla Lighthouse (Norwegian: Haugjegla fyr; also spelled: Hauggjegla) is a coastal lighthouse located in Smøla Municipality in Møre og Romsdal county, Norway. It is located on a waveswept skerry about 1 kilometre (0.62 mi) north of Veiholmen on the north side of the island of Smøla. The lighthouse is only accessible by boat. The lighthouse is listed as a protected site.

== History ==
The first light was set up in 1905, the present tower was built in 1922, and the station was automated in 1988. The 28-metre-tall (92 ft) round, cylindrical, cast-iron tower is painted red with a white stripe around it. The concrete base is painted white. The light at the top emits a white, red, or green light (depending on direction) occulting twice every 8 seconds. The 126,000-candela light can be seen for up to 15.3 nautical miles (28.3 km; 17.6 mi).

It is now possible to rent Haugjegla Lighthouse (Fyr) for a holiday in the spring and summer season, from May to September, for up to 10 persons. Tourists can participate in combination with eagle watching, fishing and a visit to the old fishing village Veiholmen.

== See also ==
- Lighthouses in Norway
- List of lighthouses in Norway
