= Wilhelm Rasmussen =

Norwegian sculptor

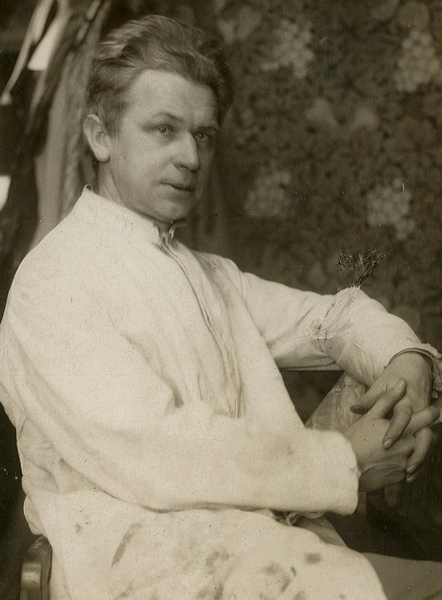
- Wilhelm Rasmussen, c. 1935
- Born: 15 June 1879; Skien, Norway
- Died: 6 December 1965 (aged 86); Oslo, Norway
- Occupation: sculptor

Wilhelm Rasmussen (15 June 1879 – 6 December 1965) was a Norwegian sculptor.

Wilhelm Robert Rasmussen was born in Skien in Telemark county, Norway. He studied under Norwegian sculptors Brynjulf Bergslien and Lars Utne (1862–1922), and later trained at the Drawing Academy in Oslo from 1895 to 1900, then a short time in Paris in 1902 and in Italy in 1906. From 1921 to 1945 he was professor of sculptor at the Norwegian National Academy of Craft and Art Industry and had among others, Ørnulf Bast as a student.

His most extensive work was the 34-meter high column originally titled Eidsvollsøylen, which in 1925 had won the competition sponsored by the Parliament of Norway for a monument on Eidsvolls plass in front of the Parliament building in memory of the Norwegian Constitution. Following a very controversial history, the 34-metre (112 ft) tall was re-titled Saga column (Sagasøyla) and was finally erected in the Bøverdalen valley in Lom Municipality in Oppland county during 1992.

Among his other works are busts of Norwegian architect Magnus Poulsson and of Norwegian poet Olav Aukrust at the National Gallery of Norway.

Between 1920 and 1922, he designed twelve caryatid in Larvikite for installation at the Tønsberg Navigation School (Sjømannsskolen i Tønsberg). The award-winning building now houses the Haugar Vestfold Art Museum (Haugar Vestfold Kunstmuseum) at Tønsberg in Vestfold.

== Membership of political party ==
He became a member of Nasjonal Samling in 1933, and "was an active member of the party". He designed the Nasjonal Samling monument in Stiklestad.
