= NS monument (Norway) =

Coordinates: 63°47′45″N 11°33′55″E

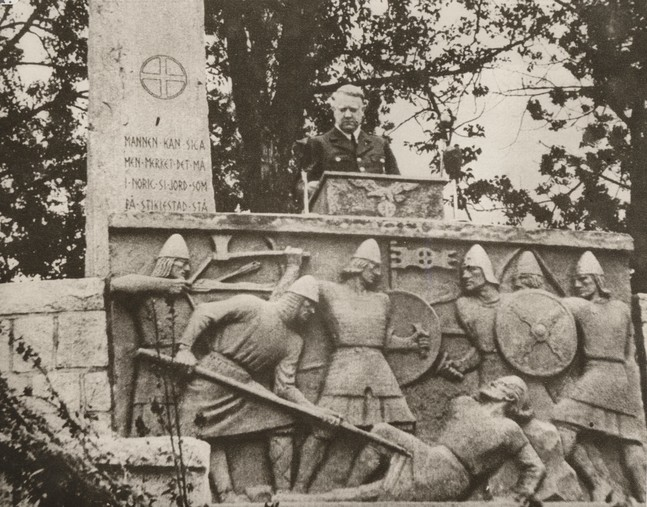
Vidkun Quisling making a speech at the NS Monument

The NS monument, or Nasjonal Samling monument, was a Norwegian 9-metre (30 ft) tall obelisk made from quartzite shale from Vågå Municipality in Norway. It was erected at Stiklestad in Nord-Trøndelag county in July 1944 and inaugurated by collaborationist Minister-President Vidkun Quisling. Since 1934, Quisling's Nasjonal Samling party had held a number of rallies at Stiklestad, in an attempt to link the party to Norway’s historic past. The NS monument took the place of the Olav's monument erected in 1807 in remembrance of Olav Haraldsson, who later became King Olaf II of Norway and received the epithet "Olaf the Holy." The Olav's monument was consequently placed in storage at Verdalsøra.

The NS monument was carved by sculptor Wilhelm Rasmussen (1879–1965) and was designed with a central obelisk, surrounded by a low wall and accessed by a staircase consisting of 39 steps. The installation carried the solar cross logo of the pro-Nazi Nasjonal Samling (NS), images with scenes from the battle of Stiklestad, and the death of King Olaf, in nationalistic viking style and stanzas from Per Sivle's poem "Tord Foleson":

Tord Foleson by Per Sivle
Norwegian text	English translation
"Mannen kan siga Men merket det må I Norig si jord Som på Stiklestad stå"	"The man can say But the mark it must In Norwegian soil As at Stiklestad stand"

The NS monument was demolished and buried nearby, and the Olav's monument restored immediately following World War II.

In December 2007 Stiklestad National Culture Centre proposed that the monument be displayed to help inform the public of Norway's Second World War history. While the issue was debated over several years, no decision to put the monument on public view has been made.
