= Brattvær Church =

Church in Møre og Romsdal, Norway

- Brattvær kirke
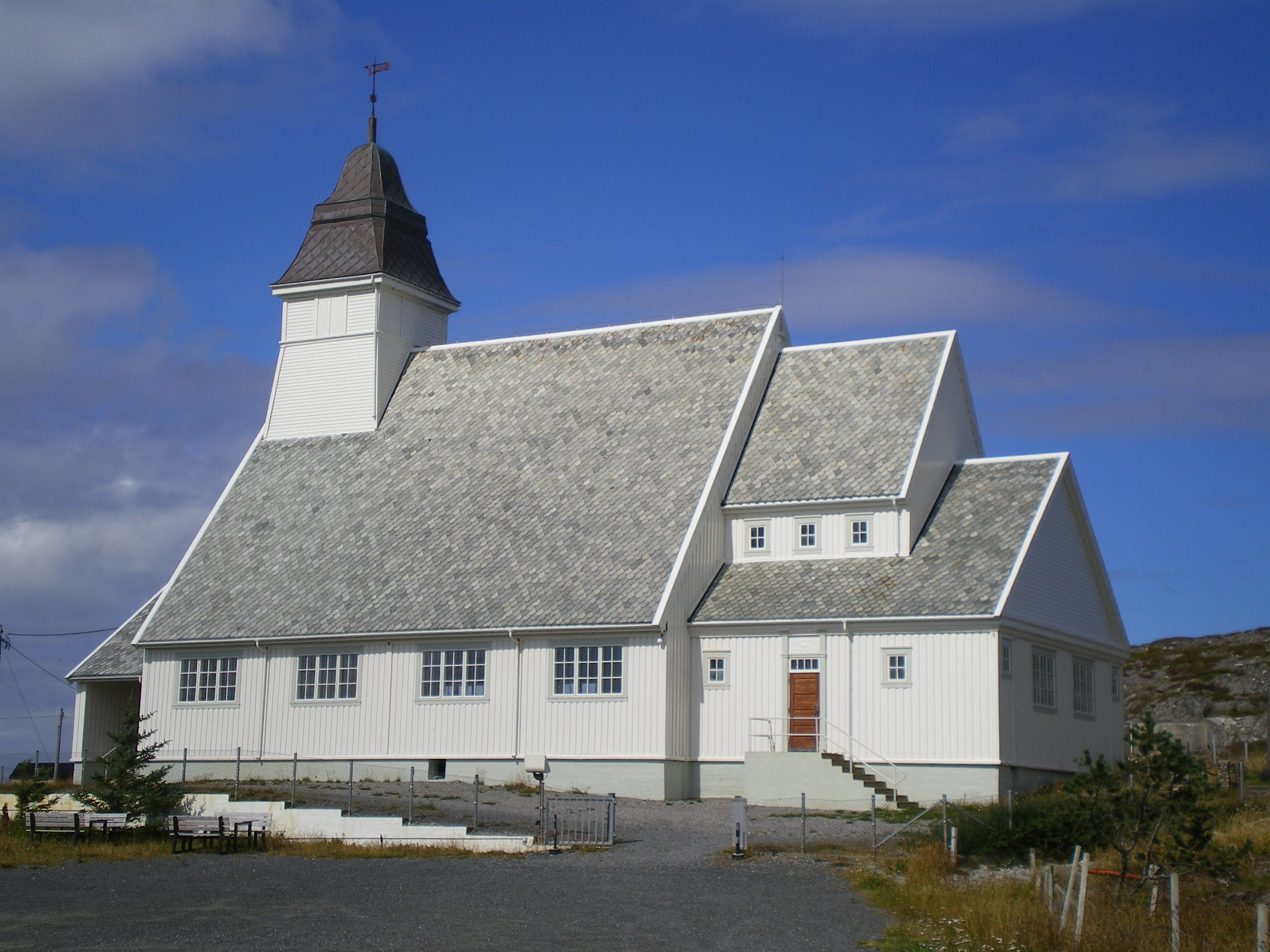
- View of the church
- Brattvær Church
- 63.4064865169°N 7.8060436248°E
- Location: Smøla Municipality, Møre og Romsdal
- Country: Norway
- Denomination: Church of Norway
- Churchmanship: Evangelical Lutheran

History
- Status: Parish church
- Founded: 15th-century
- Consecrated: 26 September 1917

Architecture
- Functional status: Active
- Architect: Jakob Parelius Holmgren
- Architectural type: Long church
- Completed: 1917 (109 years ago)

Specifications
- Capacity: 420
- Materials: Wood

Administration
- Diocese: Møre bispedømme
- Deanery: Ytre Nordmøre prosti
- Parish: Brattvær
- Norwegian Cultural Heritage Site
- Type: Church
- Status: Listed
- ID: 83943

Brattvær Church (Norwegian: Brattvær kirke) is a parish church of the Church of Norway in Smøla Municipality in Møre og Romsdal county, Norway. It is located just south of the larger village of Råket on the western coast of the island of Smøla. It is the church for the Brattvær parish which is part of the Ytre Nordmøre prosti (deanery) in the Diocese of Møre. The white, wooden church was built in a long church style in 1917 by the architect Jakob Parelius Holmgren. The church seats about 420 people.

== History ==
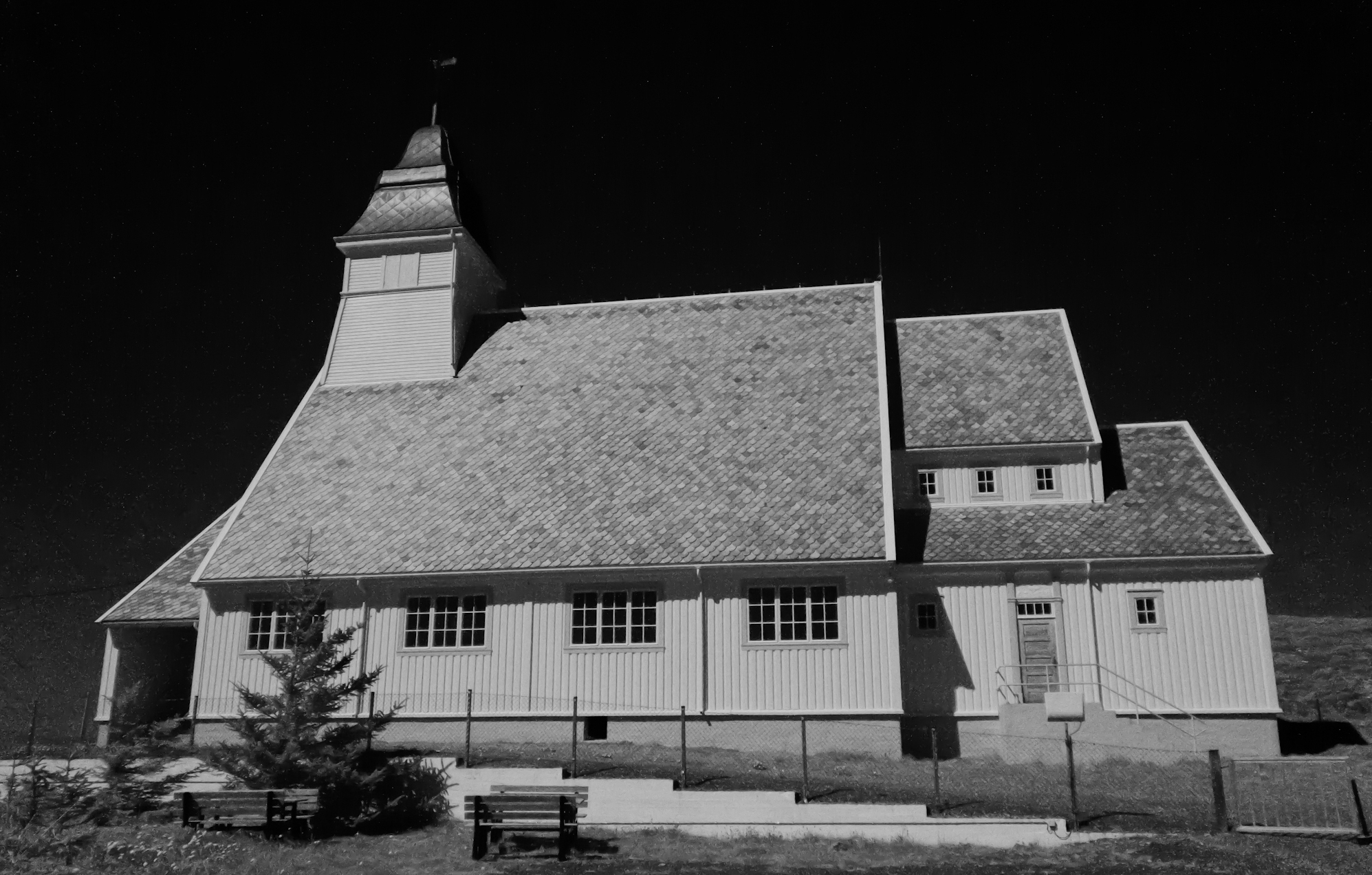
View of the church at night

The earliest existing historical records of the church date back to 1589, but the church was not new that year. It may have been built in the 1400s. The church originally stood on the highest hill on the small island of Brattværet, one of the larger islands about 3.5 kilometres (2.2 mi) northwest of the main island of Smøla. In 1661, the church was described as a stave church without a tower or spire. The church did not have a very good churchyard in which coffins could be buried due to the rocky land. In the early 1700s, the church blew down in a large storm. Soon after, in 1709, a chapel was erected on the site. This chapel building was standing until 1888.

In the 1880s, it was decided to replace the old Brattvær Church, but to build it on the main island of Smøla. The new church was built in 1885 at Skarpeneset on the west coast of Smøla. The church was designed by Henrik Nissen and Holm Munthe. After lightning strikes on 20 November 1913, the church burned down to the ground and all the historic furniture inside was lost. Work on planning a new church on the same site started immediately. The new wooden long church building was designed by Jakob Holmgren and the lead builder was O. Hamnes. The church was consecrated on 26 September 1917. In 1954, electricity was installed in the building for the first time. In the late-1970s bathrooms were installed in the building. A renovation of the building was completed in 2007 after damage from a lightning strike. The church received new white exterior paint, a new electrical system, and a newly rebuilt roof.

== See also ==
- List of churches in Møre
