= Råket =

Village in Smøla Municipality, Norway

- Village
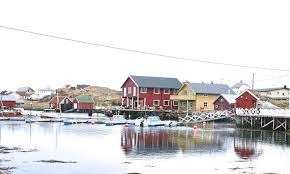
- Råket village
- Interactive map of Råket
- Location within Møre og Romsdal Location within Norway
- Coordinates: 63.4185°N 7.8217°E
- Country: Norway
- Region: Western Norway
- County: Møre og Romsdal
- District: Nordmøre
- Municipality: Smøla Municipality
- Elevation: 8 m (26 ft)
- Time zone: UTC+01:00 (CET)
  - Summer (DST): UTC+02:00 (CEST)
- Post Code: 6570 Smøla

Råket is a village in Smøla Municipality in Møre og Romsdal county, Norway. It is located on the northwestern part of the island of Smøla, just west of the village of Dyrnes. Brattvær Church is located just south of the village. The uninhabited islands of Brattværet lie offshore about 3.5 kilometres (2.2 mi) to the northwest of Råket.

The villages of Råket and Dyrnes formerly constituted an urban area called Dyrnesvågen according to Statistics Norway. The 0.86-square-kilometre (210-acre) village area had a population (2003) of 257 and a population density of 299 inhabitants per square kilometre (770/sq mi). Since 2003, the population and area data for this village area has not been separately tracked by Statistics Norway.
