= Stiklestad =

Village in Verdal Municipality, Norway

- Village
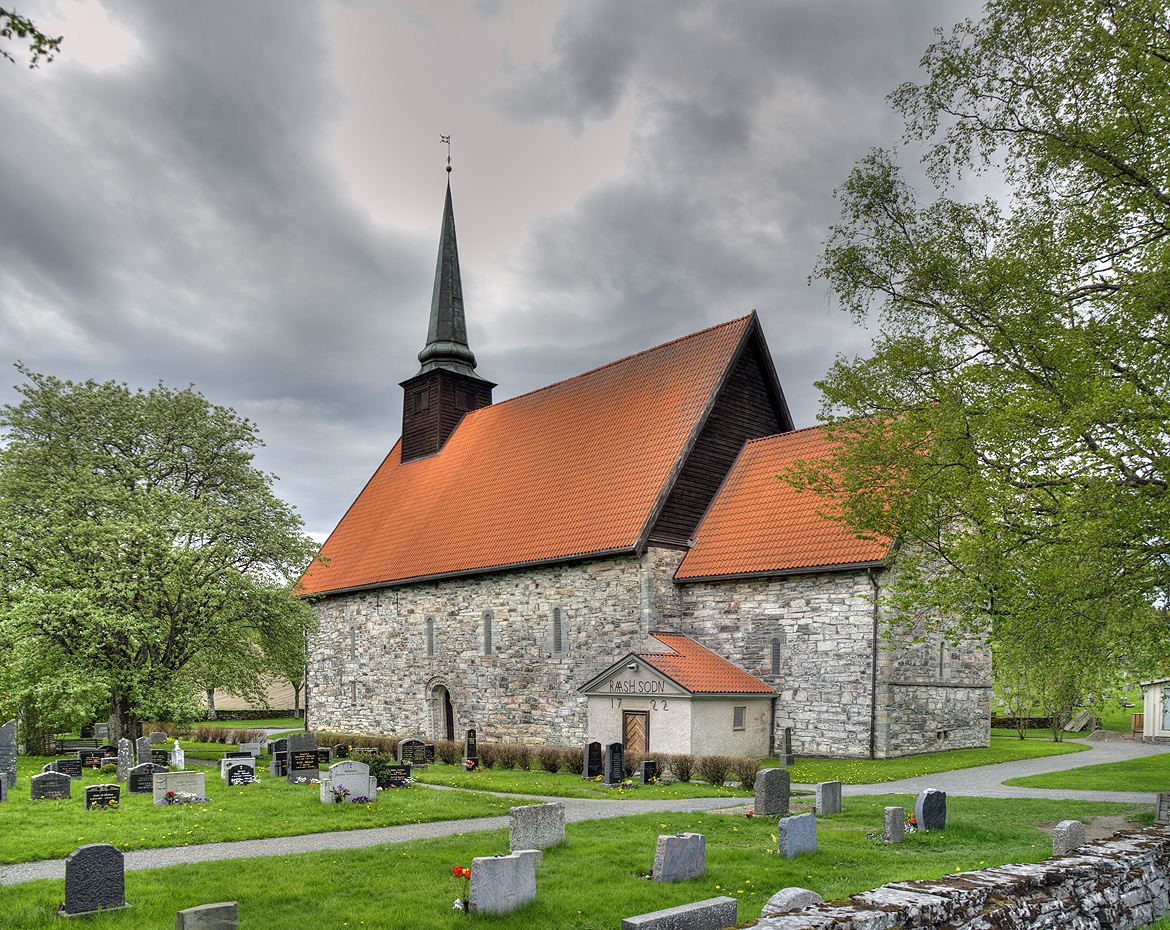
- The Stiklestad Church
- Interactive map of Stiklestad
- Location within Trøndelag Location within Norway
- Coordinates: 63.7960°N 11.5588°E
- Country: Norway
- Region: Central Norway
- County: Trøndelag
- District: Innherred
- Municipality: Verdal Municipality
- Elevation: 18 m (59 ft)
- Time zone: UTC+01:00 (CET)
  - Summer (DST): UTC+02:00 (CEST)
- Post Code: 7650 Verdal

Stiklestad is a village in Verdal Municipality in Trøndelag county, Norway. It is located 4 kilometres (2.5 mi) east of the town of Verdalsøra and about 2 kilometres (1.2 mi) southeast of the village of Forbregd/Lein.

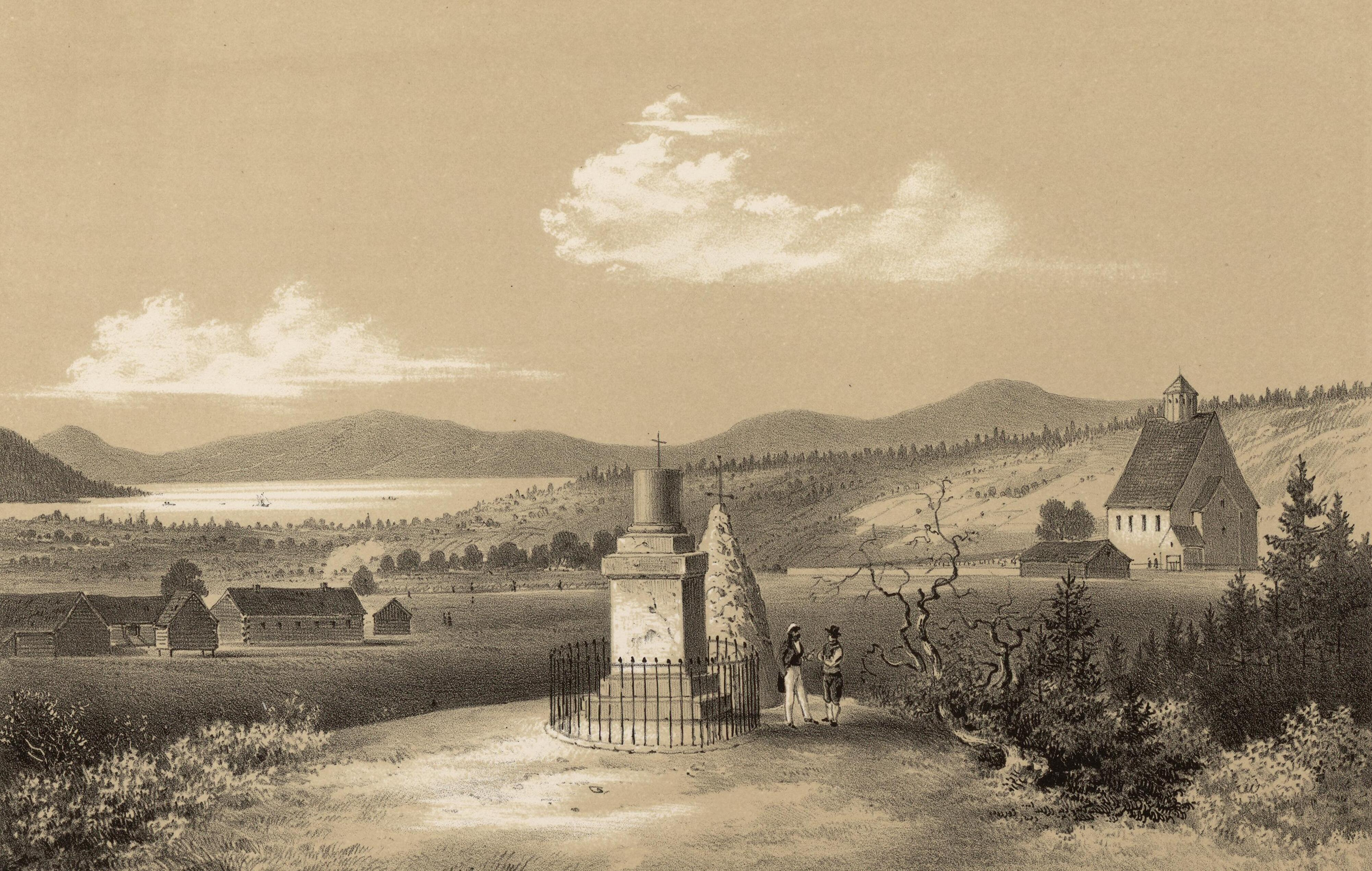
Stiklestad in 1848, showing the St Olav memorial erected in 1807

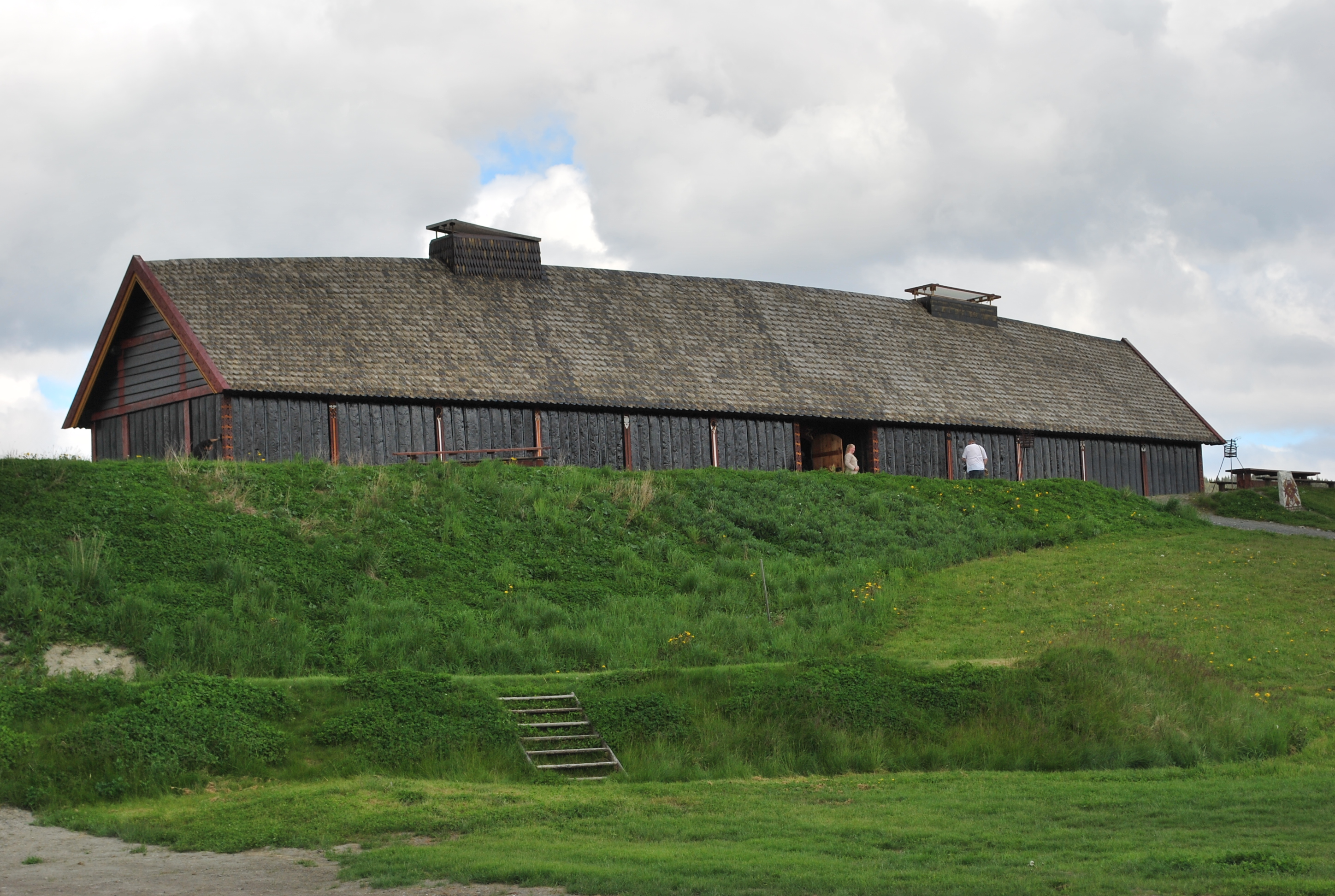
Reconstructed Longhouse at the Stiklestad National Culture Centre.

The village is mainly known as the site of the Battle of Stiklestad on 29 July 1030. Stiklestad Church is located in the village and it is assumed to have been erected on the exact spot where King Olaf II Haraldsson fell in the battle. The king was buried in Nidaros (Trondheim), canonised there on 3 August 1031, and later enshrined in Nidaros Cathedral. Following the Lutheran reformation of 1537 the saint's remains were removed and their precise resting-place has been unknown since 1568. The village is currently a Church of Norway parish and the seat of the Stiklestad prosti.

== Name ==
The Old Norse form of the name is Stiklarstaðir. The first element is stikl which might have been derived from the verb stikla which means "to jump" or "hop over stepping stones" (possibly referring to crossing a brook or stream). This might have been the name of a nearby brook. The last element is staðr which means "farm" or "abode".

In the 13th century Gesta Danorum, or "The History of the Danes," Saxo Grammaticus recorded that the town was named after Stikla, a shield-maiden who was most famous for raiding with the Viking captain Rusla (Rusla was known as "The Red Maiden" for her brutal raids on Irish ships.) Stikla would have settled in the area at some point after her participation in the Battle of Clontarf in 1014.

== Recent history ==
Given King Olav II’s role in the spread of Christianity in Norway, Stiklestad has been a significant site in Norwegian national culture since the 1030 battle. There has been an Olav memorial there since medieval times.

Between 1934 and 1944 Vidkun Quisling’s Nationalist Nasjonal Samling party held a number of rallies at Stiklestad, in an attempt to link the party to Norway’s historic past. A special Nasjonal Samling monument was inaugurated there in July 1944, before being demolished a year later after the fall of Quisling's government.

Since 1954 an annual the Saint Olav Drama, a re-enactment of the days leading up to the battle of 1030, has taken place at a specially built amphitheatre at Stiklestad.

In 1995, a Parliamentary decree established Stiklestad National Culture Centre (Norwegian: Stiklestad Nasjonale Kultursenter) at Stiklestad to promote the story and heritage of Saint Olaf, including the annual Saint Olav Drama. There is also a folk museum, that includes a medieval farm, and a hotel housed in the same building as the Culture Centre.

== Panorama of the area ==
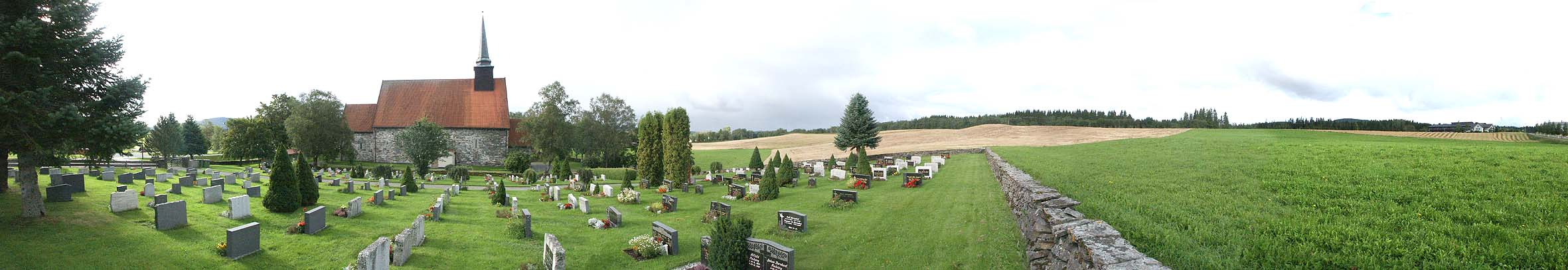
View of the area (scroll to the right for more of the picture)

== See also ==
- The Saint Olav Drama, an annual ceremony commemorating the historic Battle of Stiklestad
- Stiklestad Church, Twelfth Century Parish Church
- Nasjonal Samling monument, erected by Quisling in 1944
