= Veiholmen =

Village in Smøla Municipality, Norway

- Village and island group
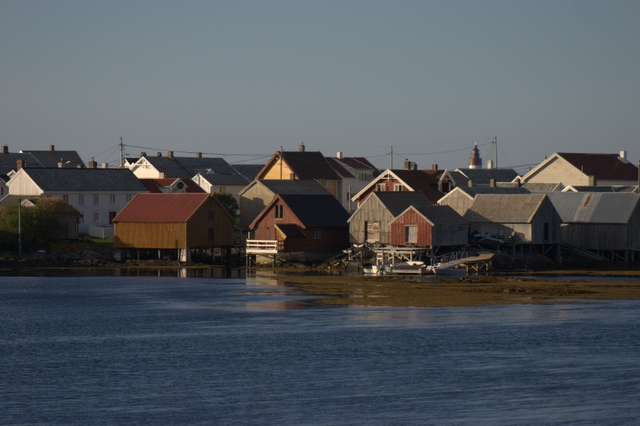
- View of the village
- Interactive map of Veiholmen
- Location within Møre og Romsdal Location within Norway
- Coordinates: 63°31′08″N 07°57′09″E
- Country: Norway
- Region: Western Norway
- County: Møre og Romsdal
- District: Nordmøre
- Municipality: Smøla Municipality
- Elevation: 3 m (9.8 ft)

Population (2015)
  - Total: 212
- Time zone: UTC+01:00 (CET)
  - Summer (DST): UTC+02:00 (CEST)
- Post Code: 6570 Smøla

Veiholmen is a fishing village located on a group of tiny islands in the northern part of Smøla Municipality in Møre og Romsdal county, Norway. The island is located at the end of a 7-kilometre (4.3 mi) long road leading north from the village of Hopen. The road goes over many islands connecting Veiholmen to the main island of Smøla to the south. In 2015, the village had a population of 212.

Haugjegla Lighthouse is located about 1 kilometre (0.62 mi) north of Veiholmen on a small skerry.

For some time, Veiholmen was one of Norway's largest fishing villages (located south of Lofoten), but it has declined significantly throughout the 20th century. Today, Veiholmen is a very popular place for tourists in the spring, summer, and autumn. The population grows from around 200 people in the winter to more than 2000 people during the peak summer season. The island has several tourist attractions as the Haugjegla Lighthouse, the old fishing village itself, several museums, and very good fishing opportunities.
